= List of Christmas dishes =

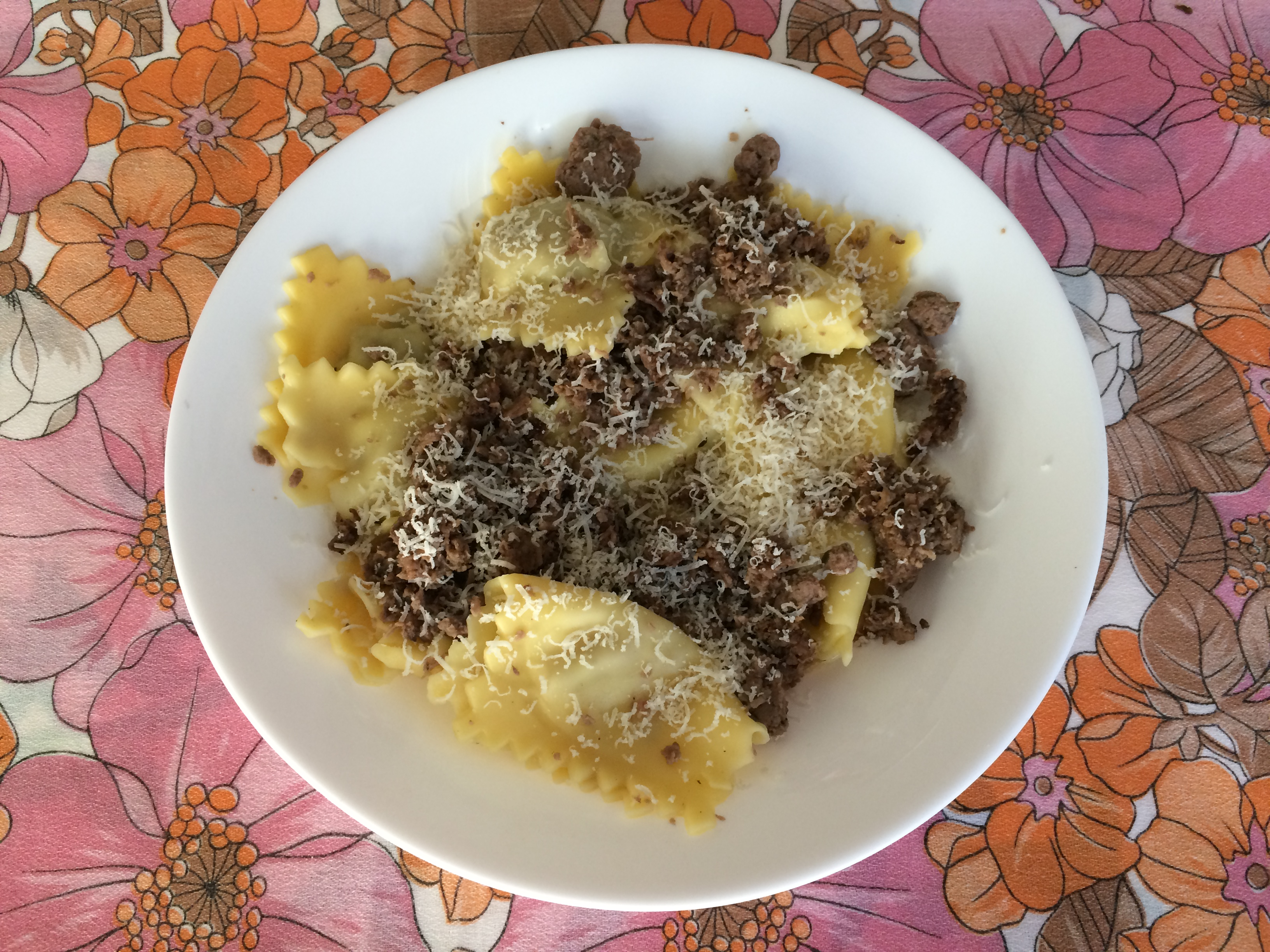
A plate of dry Italian Pavese agnolotti, with a Pavese stew-based sauce, a Christmas dish.

This is a list of Christmas dishes by country.

== Albania and Kosovo ==
- Baklava
- Gjel deti me përshesh
- Trelece

== Andorra ==
- Sopa de Galets
- Trinxat

== American Samoa (U.S.), Samoa, Tonga and Tuvalu ==
- Puaa umu

== Argentina and Uruguay ==
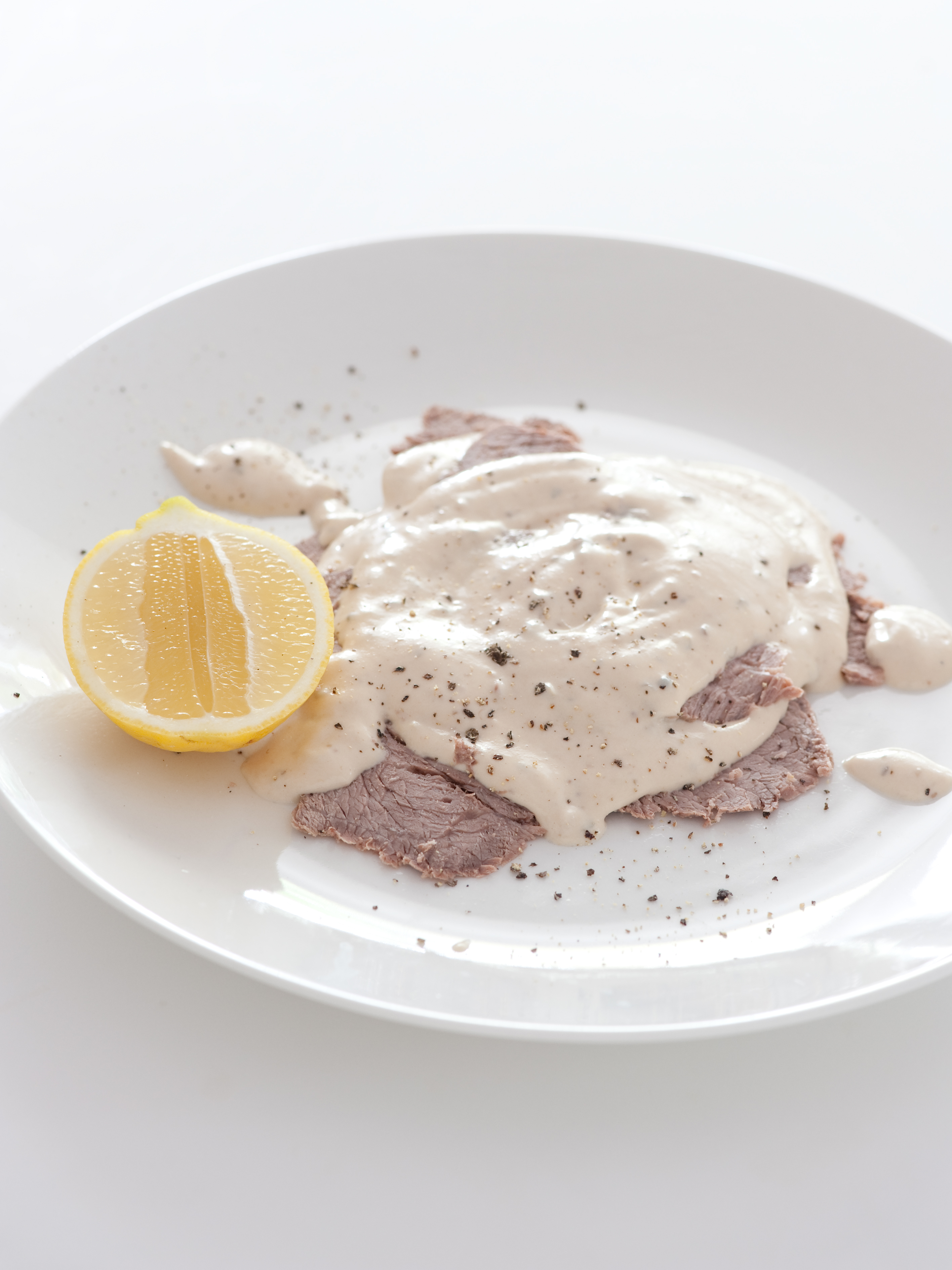
Vitello tonnato is a popular Christmas dish in Argentina, where it is known as vitel toné. The Piedmontese dish is valued during the summer for its cold serving temperature, and is the legacy of the large Italian immigration to the country.

Panettone (known locally as pan dulce) and turrón are the most popular Christmas sweets in Argentina regardless of socioeconomic status, with 76% of Argentines choosing the former and 59% the latter in 2015. Mantecol, a typical peanut dessert, is also popular, being favored by 49% of Argentines in the same survey. Sparkling wines, ciders and frizzantes concentrate most of their sales during Christmas season; sparkling wine is mostly consumed by small families with high and medium socioeconomic status living in Greater Buenos Aires and the country's largest cities, while cider and frizzantes are popular among lower classes and large families.

- Vitel toné
- Turrón
- Pan dulce
- Asado (beef, chicken, calf, lamb, suckling pig)
- Clericó (or clericot), a sangria-like beverage that combines wine with chopped fruit.
- Cider (apple, pineapple) and sparkling wine
- Budín
- Salads
  - Russian salad
  - Waldorf salad
  - Fruit salad
- Pionono
- Matambre
- Lengua a la vinagreta
- Garrapiñadas, dried fruits and comfits
- Mantecol
- Sandwiches de miga
- Pavita

== Australia ==
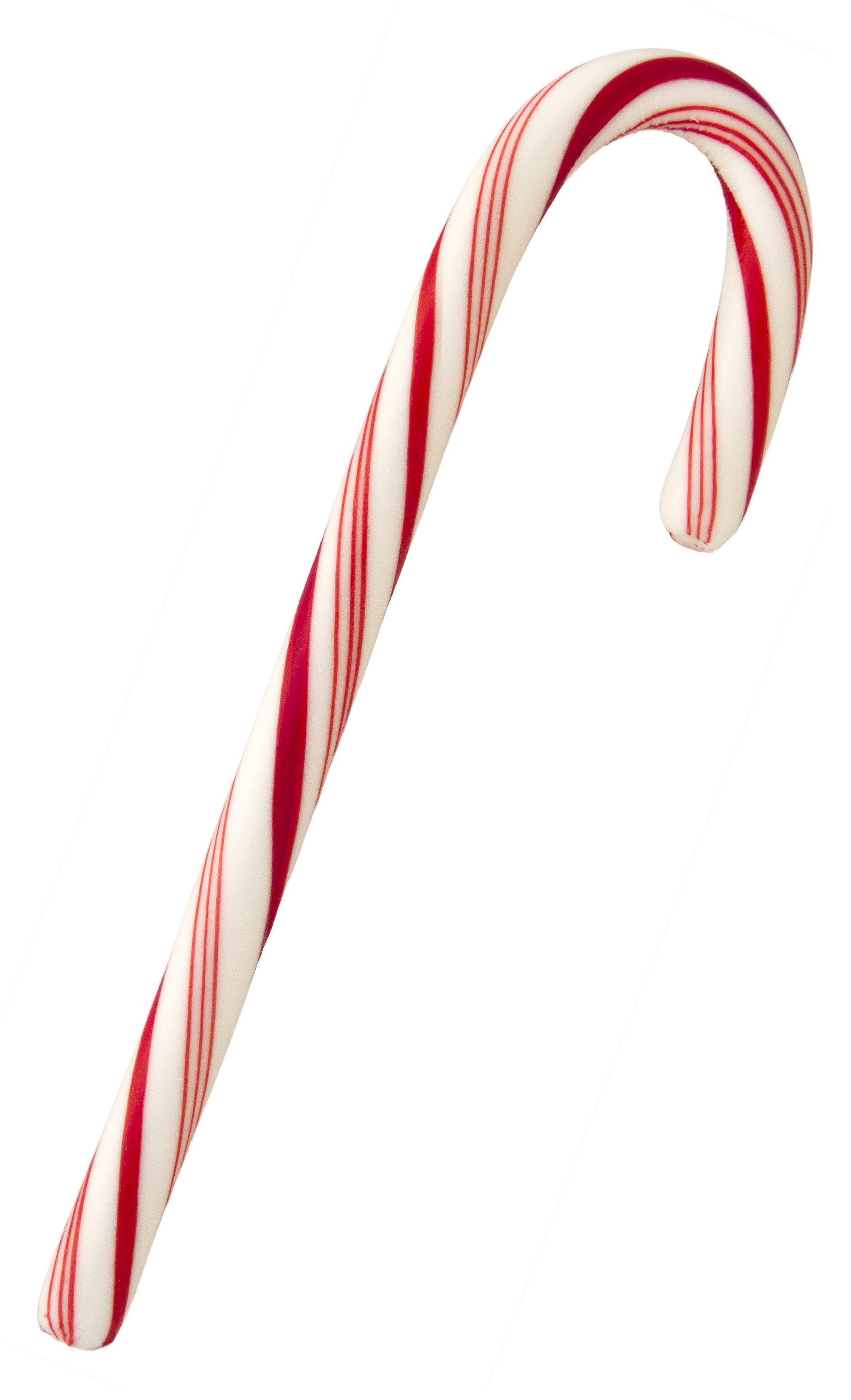
Candy Cane can be hung as edible decorations.

- White Christmas, a sweet slice made of copha and mixed fruit
- Cold ham and cold turkey
- Seafood and salads
- Roast chicken, ham and turkey
- Stuffing
- Christmas cake or Christmas pudding
- Custard
- Gingerbread in Christmas shapes
- Christmas damper – in wreath or star shape, served with butter, jam, honey or golden syrup. Made in the Australian bush in the 19th century.
- Lollies, such as rocky road; rum balls; candy canes
- Champagne
- Eggnog
- Trifle
- Pavlova
- Prawns
- Mince pie
- Christmas cookies

== Austria and Liechtenstein ==
- Bock
- Bratwurst
- Christmas carp
- Christmas goose
- Glühwein
- Kaiserschmarrn
- Knödel
- Linzer torte
- Red cabbage
- Vanillekipferl

== Bangladesh ==
- Pitha
- Nankhatai
- Pulao
- Rôst
- Musallam
- Cha
- Homemade Christmas cake
- Shobji
- Mishti (Bengali sweets)
- Nakshi Pitha
- Chunga pitha
- Patishapta Pith
- Bhapa pitha
- Tel pitha

== Belarus ==
- Borscht
- Kutya

== Belgium ==
- Cougnou (with various like cougnolle), sweet bread in the form of the infant Jesus

== Belize, Costa Rica, El Salvador, Guatemala, Honduras and Nicaragua ==
- Tamales
- Ponche (Christmas fruit punch served hot with much fruit)
- pavo (turkey)
- Buñuelos (fluffy sweet dessert made with corn with maple syrup)
- chicken (prepared with different stuffings and accompanied with various side dishes such as salads or rice)

== Bolivia and Peru ==
- Apple cider
- Buñuelo
- Roasted chicken
- Cuy Chactado
- Potato salad
- Roast pork
- Roast turkey
- Chocolatada

== Brazil ==
- Lombo à Califórnia – pork loins
- Rabanada – French toast
- Leitão assado – roasted piglet
- Peru – roast turkey
- Farofa
- Pavê – trifle
- Ham
- Bacalhau – codfish
- Brazil nut
- Arroz à grega
- Potato salad
- Salpicão – chicken salad with raisins
- Panettone
- Crème caramel
- Mousse
- Cider
- Grape juice
- Wine

== Cambodia ==
- Khmer Curry (Typically eaten with either baguette or num banh chok)
- Fish amok
- Pleah sach ko
- Sach Ang (Grilled meats and seafood)
- Num ansom

== Canada ==
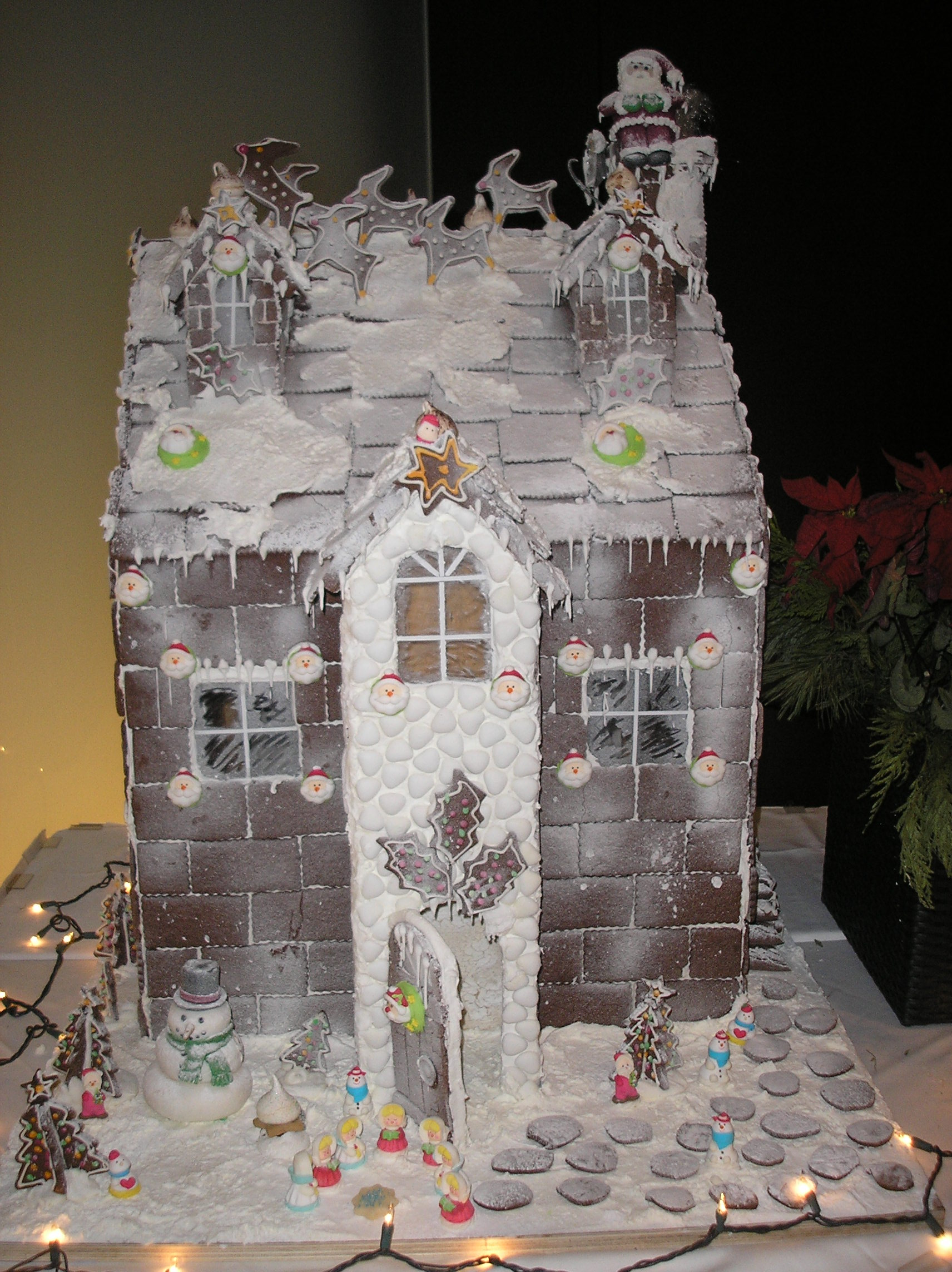
Gingerbread house

- Bûche de Noël
- Butter tarts
- Candy canes
- Christmas pudding
- Eggnog
- Fruitcake
- Mince pie
- Cranberry sauce
- Roasted turkey
- Brussels Sprouts
- Mashed Potatoes and Gravy
- Shortbread
- Stuffing (also known as Trimming or Dressing)
- Trifle
- Tourtière
- Ragoût de Boulettes (Meatball Stew)
- Ragoût de Pattes de Cochon (Stewed Pig's Feet)
- Salted Beef (commonly known as Corned Beef)
- Fish and Brewis
- Gingerbread cookies (or Ginger and Molasses cookies)
- Figgy duff (pudding)
- Christmas slush (made from a mixture of fruit juices, vodka, ginger ale, or lemon-lime soda)
- Roasted chestnuts
- Christmas cookies
- Snowball dessert (made with cocoa, rolled oats and coconut)
- Nanaimo Bar
- Mulled Wine
- Christmas Ham
- Tarte au sucre
- Hot chocolate (also known as "hot cocoa", in various flavours like peppermint, white chocolate, etc.)
- Gingerbread house
- Sweet potatoes or Yam
- Hot Apple cider
- Raw Caribou, Seal meat, and Muktuk (eaten in Nunuvut by the local Indigenous communities)
- Arctic char (raw or cooked)

== Chile ==
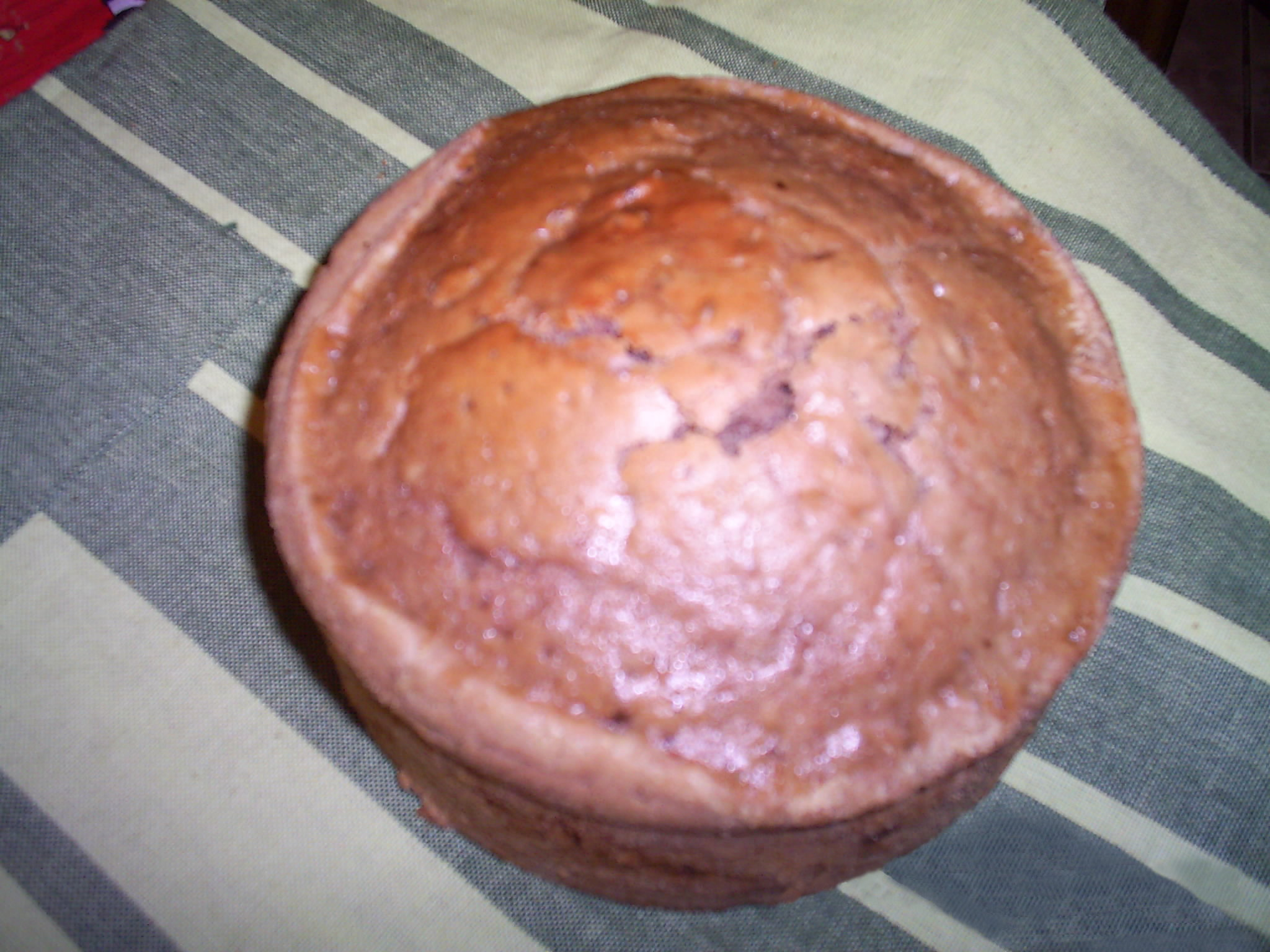
Pan de pascua

- Cola de mono – (literally, "monkey's tail") a Chilean Christmas beverage, with aguardiente, milk, coffee, and flavoured with vanilla and cloves
- Pan de Pascua – Chilean Christmas sponge cake flavoured with cloves and with bits of candied fruits, raisins, walnuts and almonds.
- Roasted turkey
- Ponche a la romana – eggnog-style beverage made of champagne and pineapple-flavoured icecream.

== Colombia ==
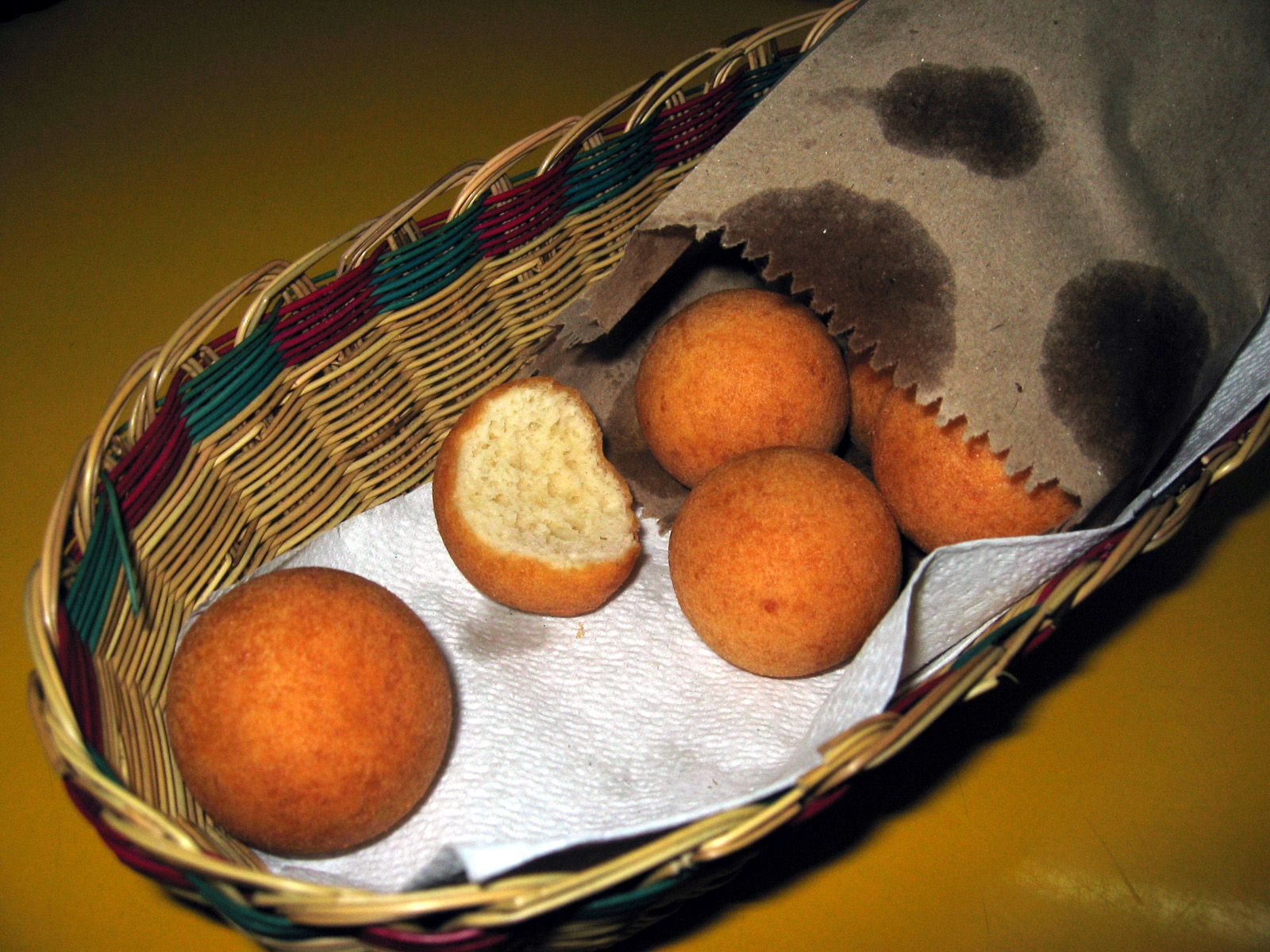
Colombian Buñuelos

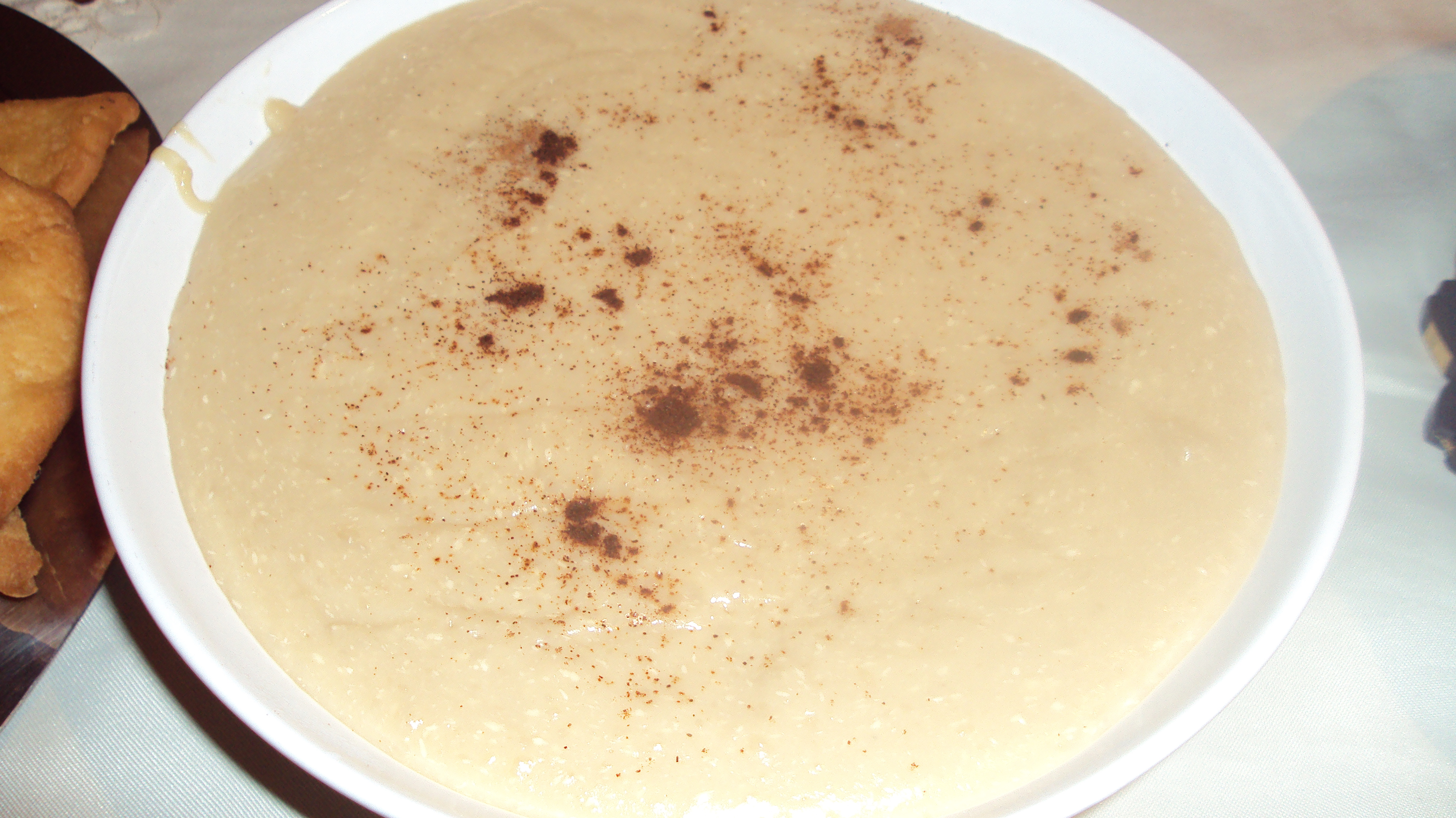
Colombian natilla

Colombian Christmas dishes are mostly sweets and desserts. Some of the most popular dishes include:

- Buñuelos
- Natilla
- Manjar blanco
- Hojaldres
- Brevas (Candied figs with cheese)
- Christmas cookies
- Sweet bread filled with fruits like raisins and raspberries.
- Lechona (rice baked inside a pig, with peas, the meat of the pig and other delicacies)
- Tamales
- Ponqué envinado (red wine cake)
- Turkey
- Pernil de Cerdo (pork leg, usually roasted)
- Potato salad
- Panettone

== Cuba ==
- Crema De Vie – Eggnog made with rum, lemon rind, and spices.
- Majarete – A pudding made with corn, cornstarch, milk, lemon rind, spices, and sugar
- Platillo Moros y Cristianos
- Lechon asado
- Turrón

== Czech Republic and Slovakia ==
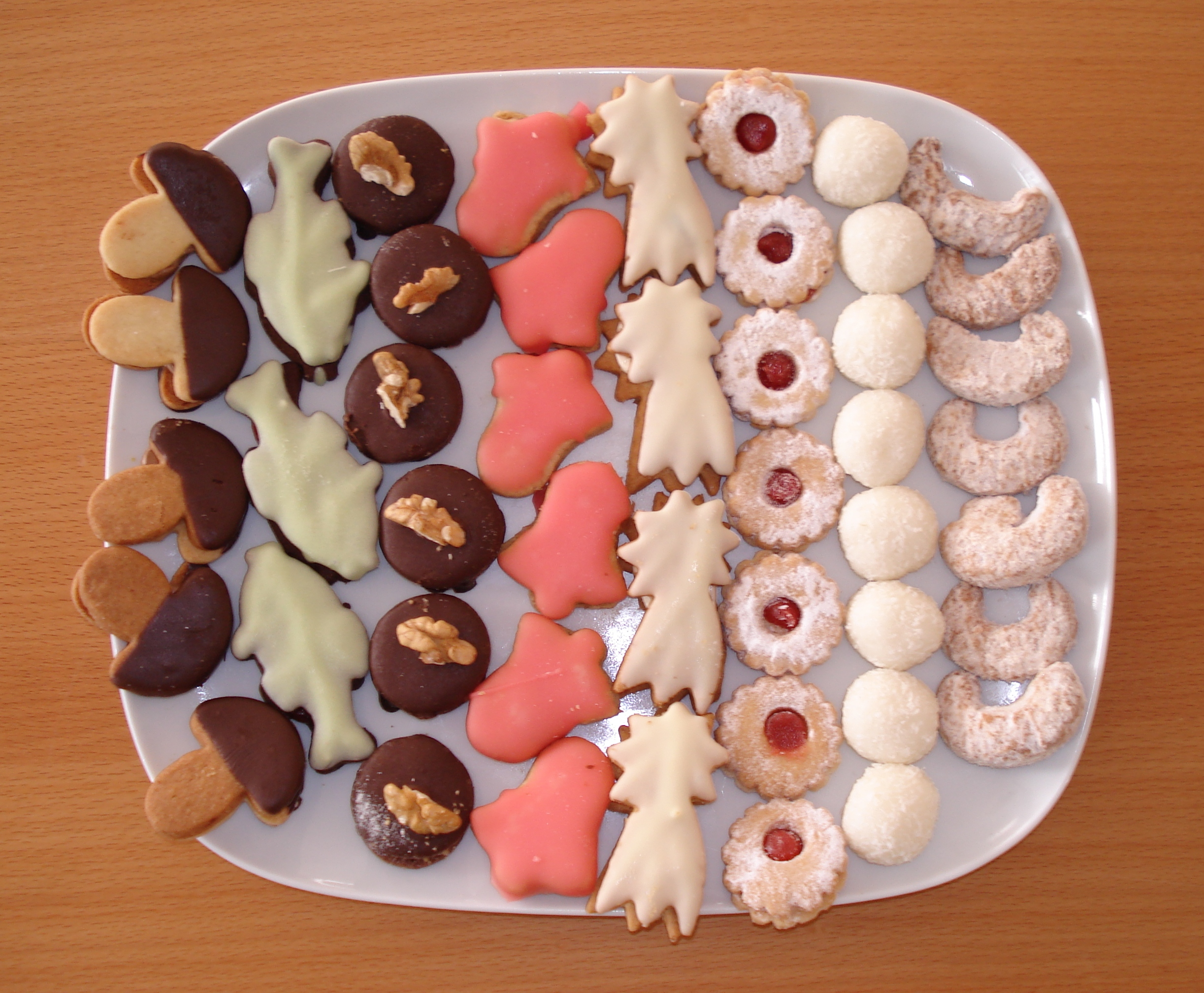
Christmas cookies (vánoční cukroví)

- Kapustnica – Christmas cabbage soup
- Fish soup
- Christmas carp
- Potato salad with mayonnaise, hard-boiled eggs and boiled vegetables
- Kuba – groats and mushrooms
- Grilled white sausage
- Vánoční cukroví – Christmas cookies
- Christmas bread (vánočka)
- Fruitcake
- Gingerbread

Before the Christmas holidays, many kinds of sweet biscuits are prepared. These sweet biscuits are then served during the whole Christmas period and exchanged among friends and neighbours. Also very popular are a preparation of small gingerbreads garnished by sugar icing.

== Denmark ==
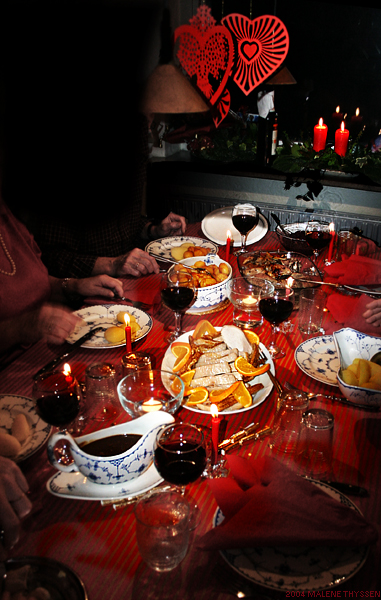
Danish Christmas meal

- Æbleskiver – traditional Danish dough ball made in a special pan (a type of doughnut with no hole), sprinkled with powdered sugar and served with raspberry or strawberry jam
- Sylte – a form of head cheese, a terrine or meat jelly made from pork, traditionally pig's head was used
- Julesild – spiced pickled herring often flavoured with Christmas spices such as cloves and allspice
- Boiled whole potatoes
- Brun sovs (brown sauce) – a traditional dark gravy, used to cover meat dishes like roasted pork and duck (flæskesteg, andesteg) and the boiled potato
- Brunede kartofler – caramelised potatoes
- Julebryg – Christmas beer
- Gløgg – mulled red wine combined with spices, sugar, raisins and chopped almonds typically served warm
- Risalamande – rice pudding. A dish made from rice, whipped cream and almonds, served cold with cherry sauce (kirsebærsauce)
- Flæskesteg – roast pork with cracklings
- Andesteg – roast duck with apple and prune stuffing
- Rødkål – red cabbage pickled, sweet-sour red cabbage served hot as a side dish
- Christmas cookies – Vaniljekranse, klejner, jødekager, pebernødder, honningkager, brunkager and finskbrød
- Konfekt, marzipan, caramelised fruits, nougat and chocolate-covered nuts
- Ground nuts

== Dominican Republic ==
- Croquette
- Empanada
- Ensalada Rusa – Olivier salad (Russian potato salad)
- Ensalada verde – iceberg lettuce, onions, cucumber, and tomatoes salad
- Moro de guandules con coco – rice with pigeon peas and coconut milk
- Pasteles de hojas – Puerto Rican tamales
- Pastelon – casserole
- Pig roast
- Pollo al horno – roasted chicken
- Telera – Dominican bread similar to Mexican sandwich rolls

Drinks:

- Anisette – anise-flavored liquor
- Guavaberry – a drink from the Lesser Antilles historic Saint Martin natives now a part of the Dominican Republics Christmas tradition
- Ponche crema – eggnog
- Jengibre – ginger tea with spices and lemon
- Mandarin Liqueur – Mandarin peels fermented with rum and sugar

Desserts:

- Buñuelos – fried cassava dough balls covered in spiced flavored syrup
- Turrón – honey and almond nougat. Tradition from Spain
- Vaniljekranse – Danish butter cookies
- Fruits and nuts – a variety of nuts, fresh, and dried fruit

== Estonia ==
- Hapukapsas
- Mulgi kapsad
- Piparkook
- Sült
- Verivorst

== Finland ==
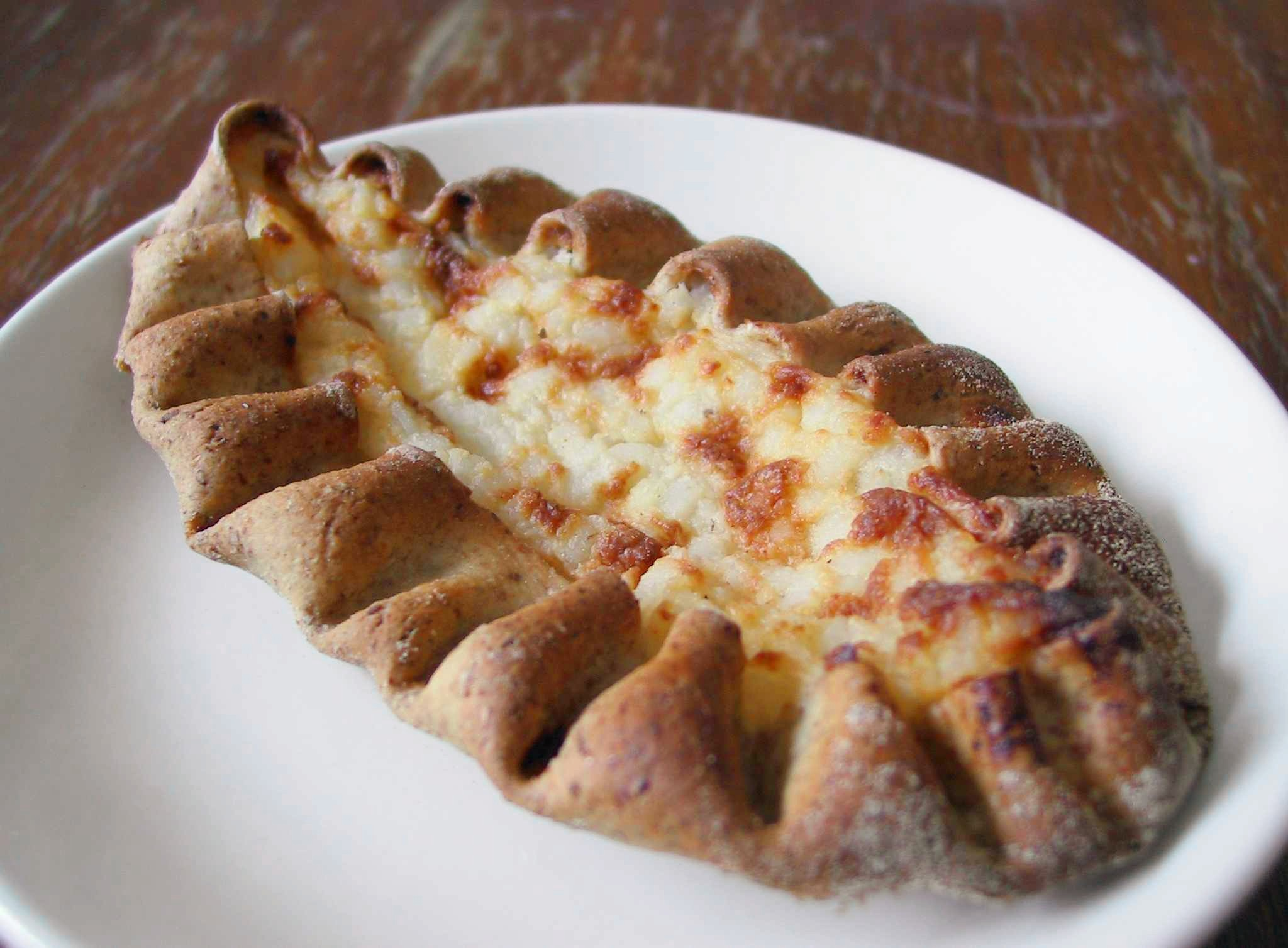
A Karelian pasty

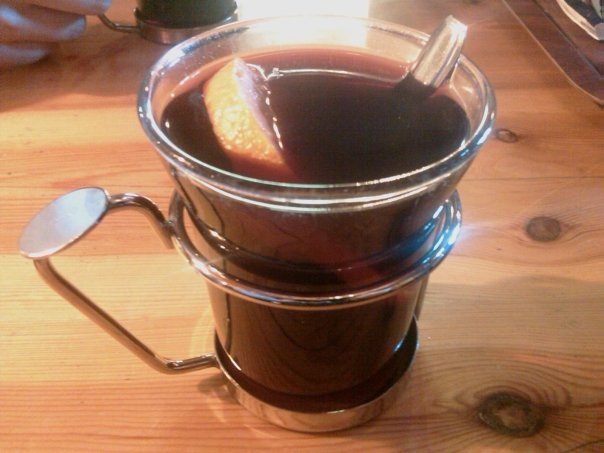
Mulled wine

Christmas smorgasbord from Finland, "joulupöytä", (translated "Yule table"), a traditional display of Christmas food served at Christmas in Finland, similar to the Swedish smörgåsbord, including:

- Christmas ham with mustard (almost every family has one for Christmas)
- Freshly salted salmon (gravlax graavilohi) and whitefish graavisiika
- Pickled herring in various forms (tomato, mustard, matjes or onion sauces)
- Rosolli (cold salad dish with diced beetroot, potato and carrot – some varieties also incorporate apple)
- Lutefisk and Béchamel sauce
- Whitefish and pikeperch
- Potato casserole (sweetened or not, depending on preference)
- Boiled potatoes
- Carrot casserole
- Rutabaga casserole (lanttulaatikko)
- Various sauces
- Assortment of cheese, most commonly (leipäjuusto) and Aura (aura-juusto)
- Christmas bread, usually sweet bread (joululimppu)
- Karelian pasties, rice pasties, served with egg-butter (karjalanpiirakka)

Other meat dishes could be:

- Karelian hot pot, traditional meat stew originating from the region of Karelia (karjalanpaisti)

Desserts:

- Rice pudding or rice porridge topped with cinnamon, sugar and cold milk or with mixed fruit soup (riisipuuro)
- Joulutorttu, traditionally a star-shaped piece of puff-pastry with prune marmalade in the middle
- Gingerbread, sometimes in the form of a gingerbread house or gingerbread man (piparkakut)
- Mixed fruit soup or prune soup, kissel (sekahedelmäkiisseli, luumukiisseli)

Drinks:

- Glögg or mulled wine (glögi)
- Christmas beer (jouluolut); local manufacturers produce Christmas varieties
- "Home beer" (non-alcoholic beer-like drink, similar to the Russian beverage kvass) (kotikalja)

== France and Monaco ==
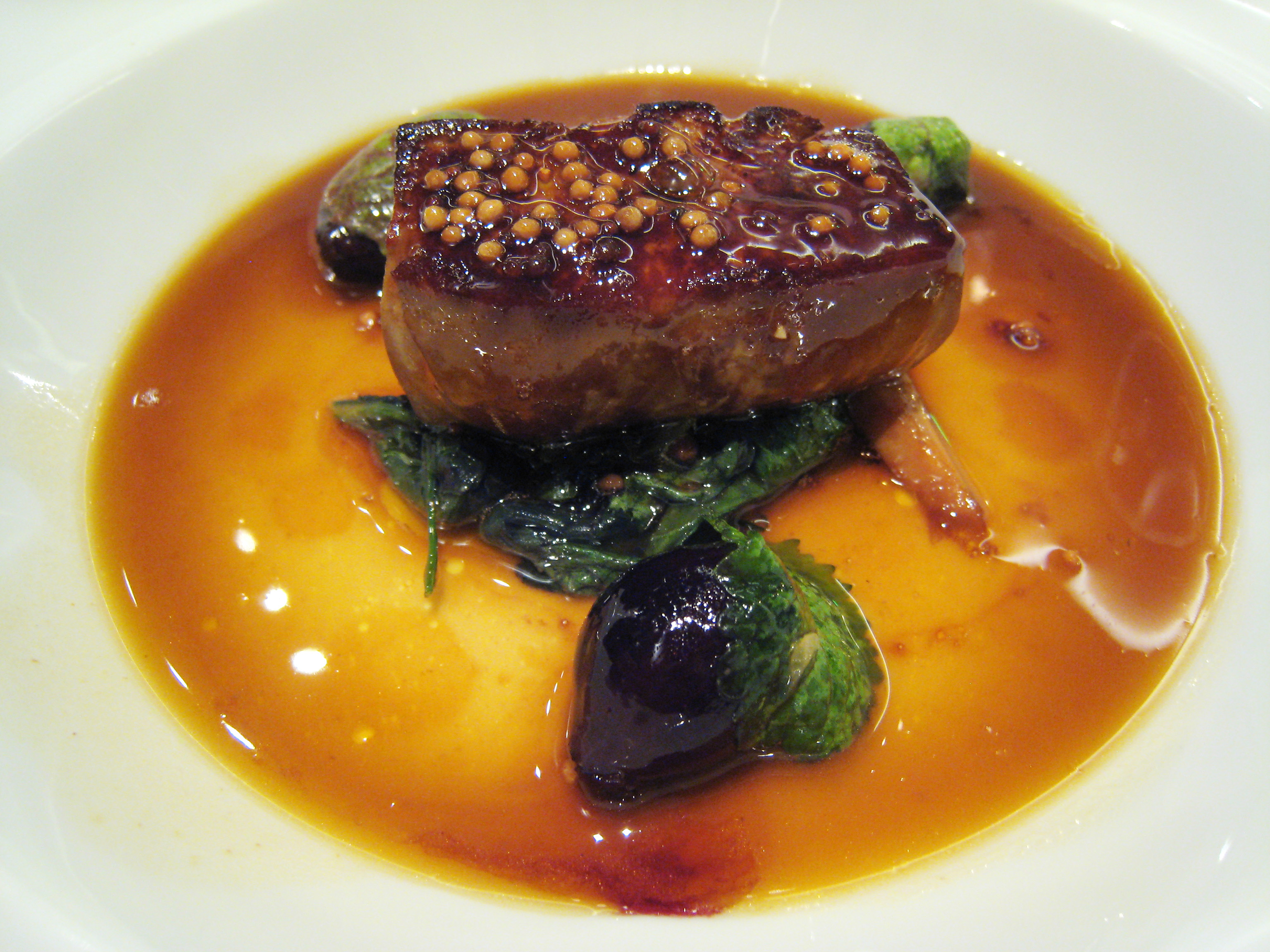
Foie gras en cocotte

- Oysters
- Foie gras
- Smoked salmon
- Scallops
- Champagne
- Crêpes (Brittany)
- Chapon (roasted chicken)
- Dinde aux Marrons (chestnut-stuffed turkey)
- Ganzeltopf (goose) (Alsace)
- Goose (Normandy)
- Bûche de Noël
- Kouglof (Alsace)
- Thirteen desserts (Provence): The thirteen desserts are the traditional Christmas dessert in the French region of Provence. The Christmas supper ends with 13 dessert items, representing Jesus Christ and the 12 apostles. The desserts are traditionally set out Christmas Eve and remain on the table three days until December 27.
- Walnut
- Quince cheese
- Almond
- Raisin
- Calisson of Aix-en-Provence
- Nougat blanc
- Nougat noir au miel
- Apple
- Pear
- Orange
- Winter melon
- Fougasse (Provençal bread)

== Germany ==
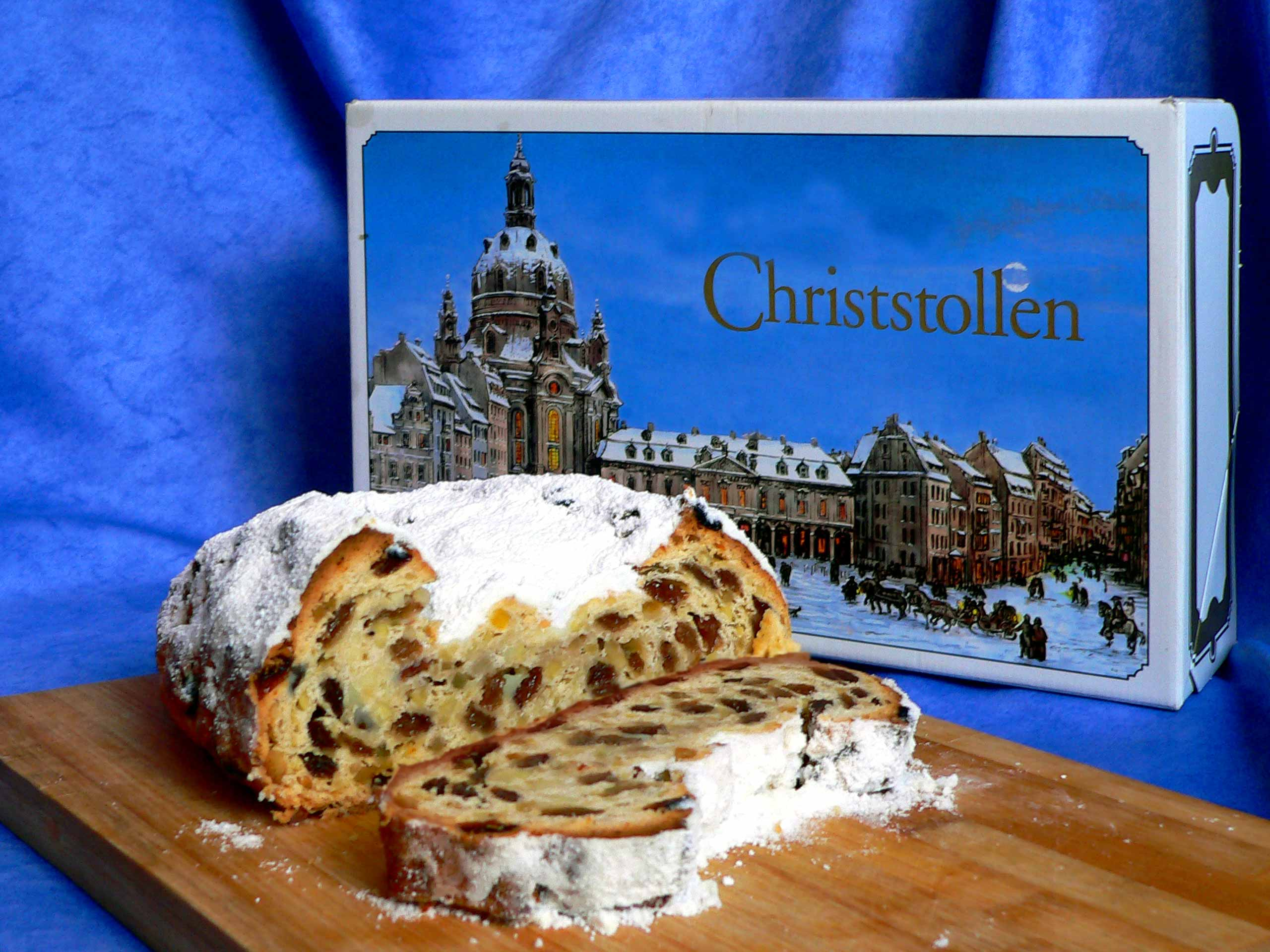
A Christmas Stollen

- Christstollen – Stollen is a fruitcake with bits of candied fruits, raisins, walnuts and almonds and spices such as cardamom and cinnamon; sprinkled with confectioners sugar. Often there's also a core of marzipan.
- Pflaumentoffel
- Christmas carp
- Pfefferkuchenhaus – a gingerbread house decorated with candies, sweets and sugar icing (in reference to the gingerbread house of the fairy tale Hänsel and Gretel)
- Printen
- Oblaten Lebkuchen
- Springerle
- Weihnachtsplätzchen (Christmas cookies)
- Roast goose, often paired with kartoffelklosse
- Venison – e.g. meat of roe deer usually served with red cabbage, brussels sprout and lingonberry sauce
- Herring salad – salad of pickled or soused herring, beetroot, potatoes, apple
- Kartoffelsalat (potato salad) with Wurst (sausages) is traditionally eaten in northern Germany for supper on Christmas Eve
- Schäufele (a corned, smoked ham) usually served with potato salad in southern Germany for dinner on Christmas Eve
- Weisswurst – sausages with veal and bacon, usually flavored with parsley, lemon, mace, onions, ginger and cardamom
- Feuerzangenbowle
- Glühwein (hot spiced wine)

== Greece and Cyprus ==
- Kourabiedes
- Melomakarono
- Diples
- Christopsomo (Christmas bread)
- Pork or turkey

== Greenland ==
- Kiviak

== Haiti ==
- Chicken Creole (Haitian stewed chicken)
- Djon Djon
- Pikliz

== Hungary ==
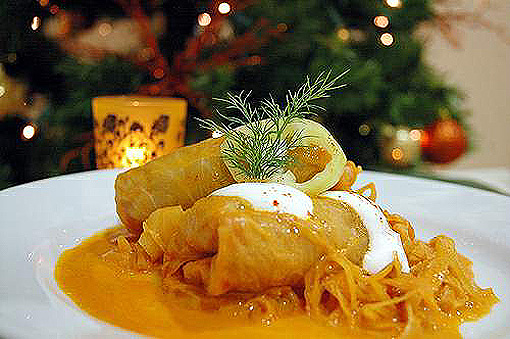
Töltött káposzta

- Christmas carp
- Fish soup (halászlé) various recipes
- Stuffed cabbage (töltött káposzta)
- Roast goose
- Roast duck
- Pastry roll filled with walnut or poppy seed (bejgli)
- Bread pudding with poppy seed (mákos guba or bobájka)
- Szaloncukor
- Cheesy Garlic Bread Sticks

== Iceland ==
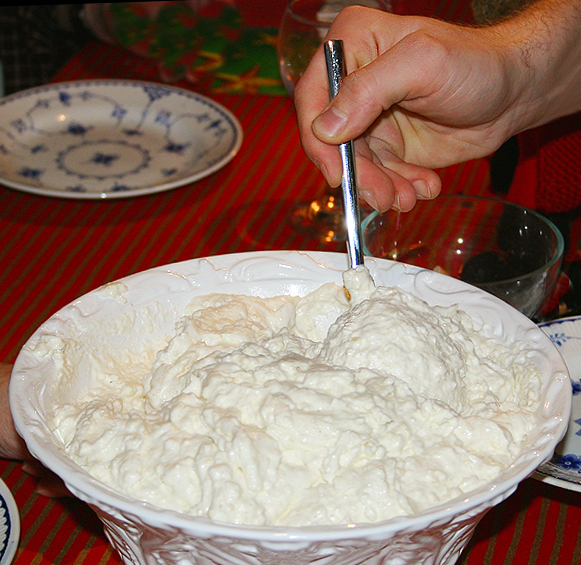
Möndlugrautur

- Hamborgarhryggur – a smoked, cured pork roast.
- Lambalæri - heated or smoked sheep meat from a sheep's foot.
- Ptarmigan – gamebird in the grouse family
- Hangikjöt
- Oven-roasted turkey
- Beverage combination of Malt and Appelsín.
- Jarðarberjagrautur
- Möndlugrautur – a Christmas rice pudding with an almond hidden inside (the same as the Swedish Julgröt)
- Caramelised potatoes
- Pickled red cabbage
- Smákökur – small cookies of various sorts
  - Jólasúkkulaðibitakökur
  - Loftkökur
  - Mömmukökur
  - Sörur
  - Spesiur
  - Gyðingakökur
  - Piparkökur
  - Marens Kornflexkökur
- Laufabrauð – round, very thin flat cakes with a diameter of about 15 to 20 cm (6 to 8 inches), decorated with leaf-like, geometric patterns and fried briefly in hot fat or oil

== India and Pakistan ==
Indian Christians and Pakistani Christians in Indian subcontinent celebrate Christmas by enjoying several dishes, such as Allahabadi cake, Candy canes, Plum cakes etc. Some of the popular dishes eaten during Christmas in India and Pakistan are:

- Allahabadi cake.
- Christmas cake – a type of fruit cake.
- Mathri – a traditional flaky biscuit.
- Gulab Jamun – a traditional sweet prepared with khoa.
- Walnut fudge
- Jalebi
- Mincemeatpie
- Kheer – boiled rice cooked with milk, sugar, saffron and is garnished with nuts such as almonds and pistachios. It can also be made with barley.
- Chhena Poda – a dessert made with Chhena (cottage cheese) which is slightly roasted and soaked in sugar syrup. It is garnished with cashew nuts and served. Chhena Poda is popular in the Odisha state of India. It is eaten during the Christmas season but is available throughout the year.
- Ghee cookies
- Rose cookies
- Bolinhas de coco – a type of coconut cookies
- Chocolate covered fruit
- Marzipan
- Dumplings – dumplings filled with Indian spices with a sweet or savoury filling.
- Tarts
- Nankhatai
- Neureos – a kind of dumpling made of semolina, khoa and nutlet.
- Roast chicken
- Dates roll- a type of Christmas cookies with dates
- Bebinca – a dessert popular in Goa which is eaten during Christmas season.
- Biryani
- Stew – stews prepared with chicken, mutton, fish.
- Candy canes
- Cormolas
- Milk cream – milk fudge
- Chocolate candies
- Vindaloo – a spicy Goan curry with pork made during Christmas.
- Fruits, such as apple, orange, guava.
- Mixed nuts
- Kulkuls
- Pilaf
- Duck curry
- Jujubee
- Cupcakes
- Drinks, such as cider, ginger ale, etc.

Church services are also held in churches throughout India and Pakistan, in which Christmas dinners are held which include dishes such as Allahabadi cake, candy canes, Christmas cookies.

The Koswad is a set of sweets and snacks prepared in the Christmastide by people of the Konkan region. South Indian states such as Kerala have traditions observed of home-brewed wine, mostly grapes but sometimes other fruits as well like apple and rose apple; ethnic recipes of slow-cooked beef fry, rice and coconut Hoppers, lamb stew, fried rice Indian and fusion style; desserts such as Falooda, pastry, and a whole array of steamed, boiled or baked sweets, often with coconut, jaggery, sugar and spices such as cardamom and cloves (Achappam, Murukku, Tapioca chip, Sukiyan, Neyyappam).

== Indonesia ==
- Gulai
- Klappertaart
- Poffertjes
- Ayam rica-rica
- Lampet
- Rendang
- Kohu-kohu
- Kidney bean soup

== Iran ==
- Ash-e doogh
- Aush reshteh
- Baghali polo
- Chelow kebab
- Kafbikh
- Nan-o-kabab
- Tahchin

== Iraq ==
- Kleicha
- Masgouf
- Qeema

== Ireland ==
- Christmas cake
- Christmas pudding
- Irish coffee
- Minced pie
- Sherry Trifle
- Spiced beef (traditionally served in Ireland and Northern Ireland)
- Roast turkey

== Israel ==
- Challah
- Latke
- Sufganiyah

== Italy ==
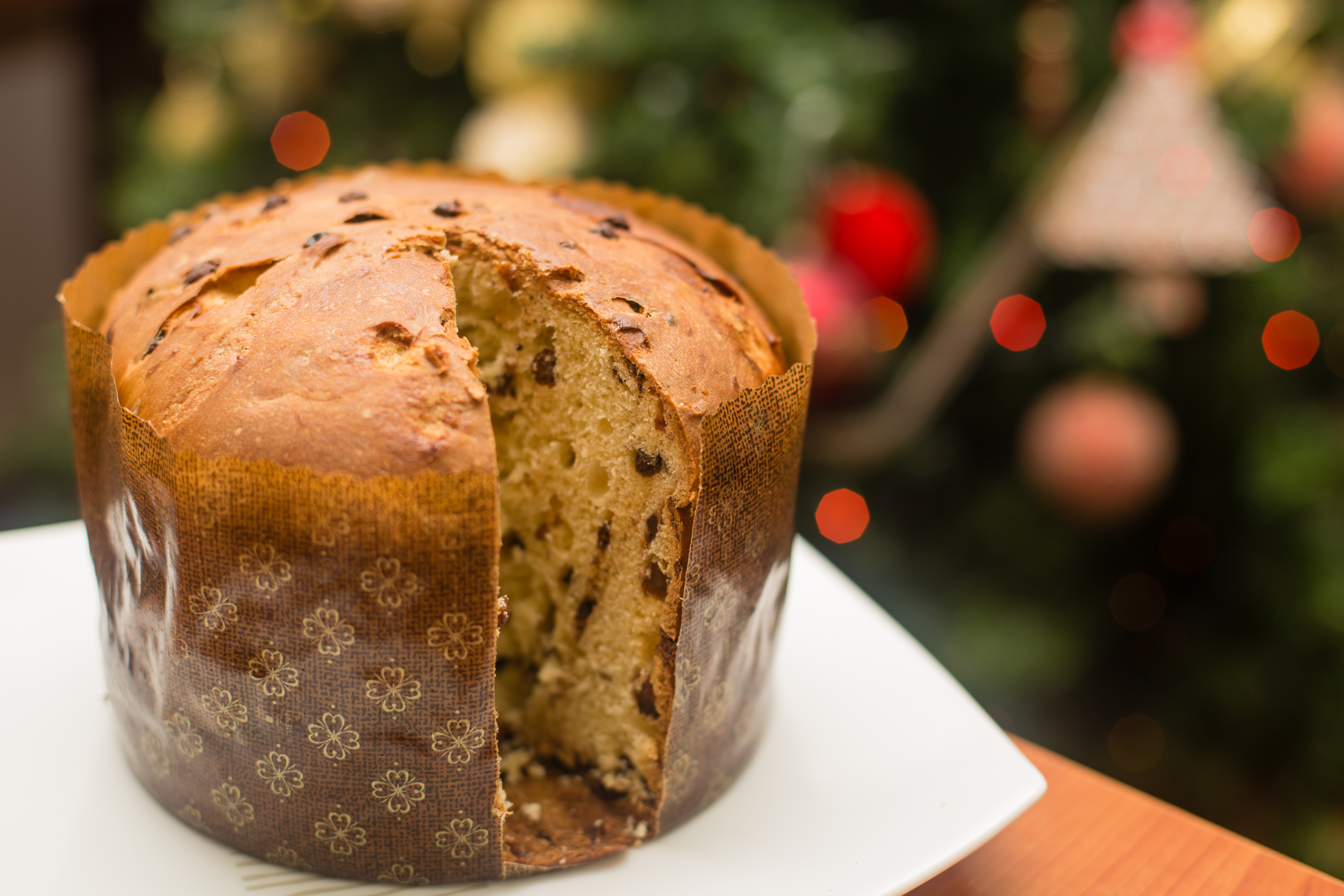
Panettone

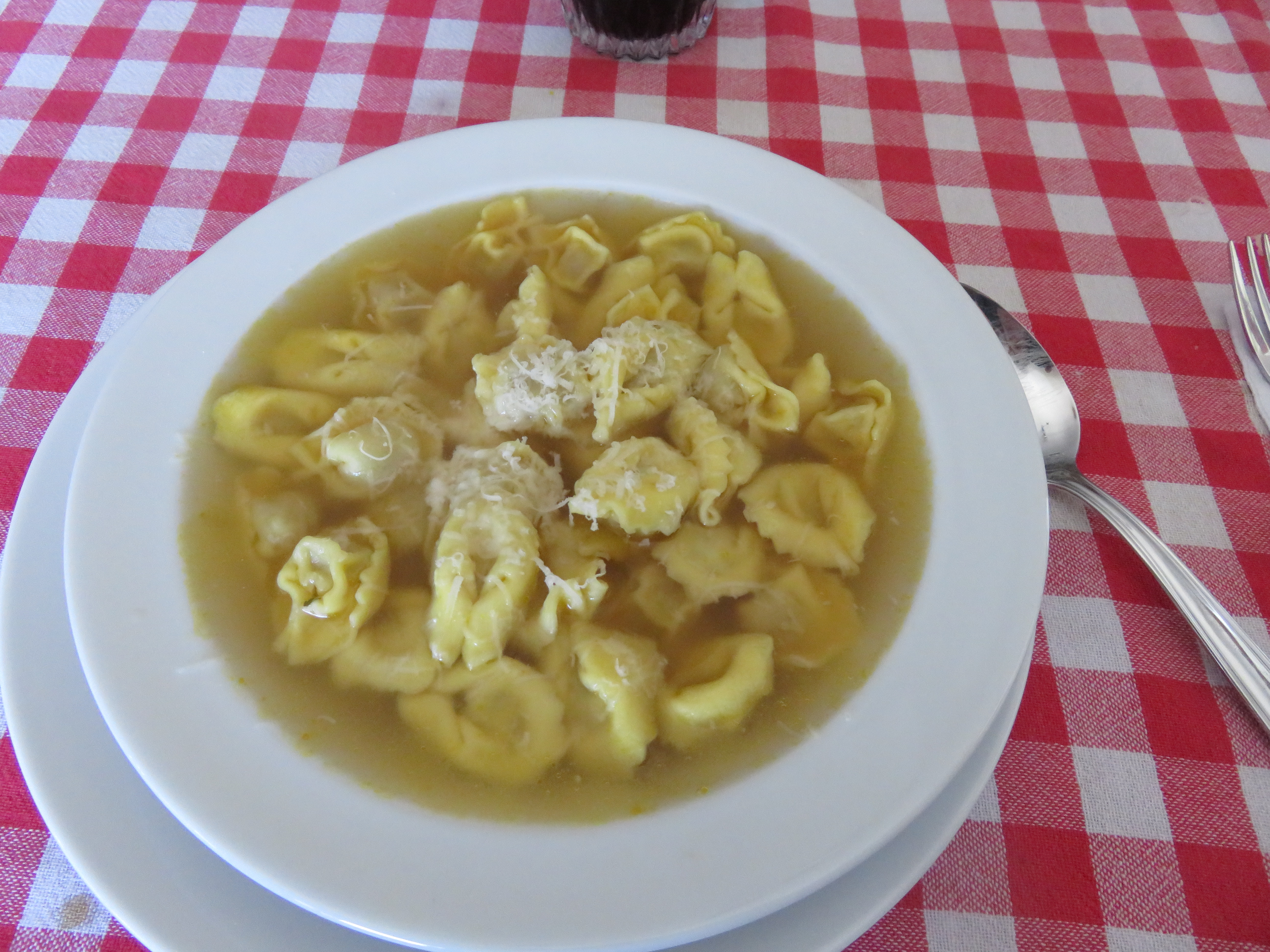
Cappelletti

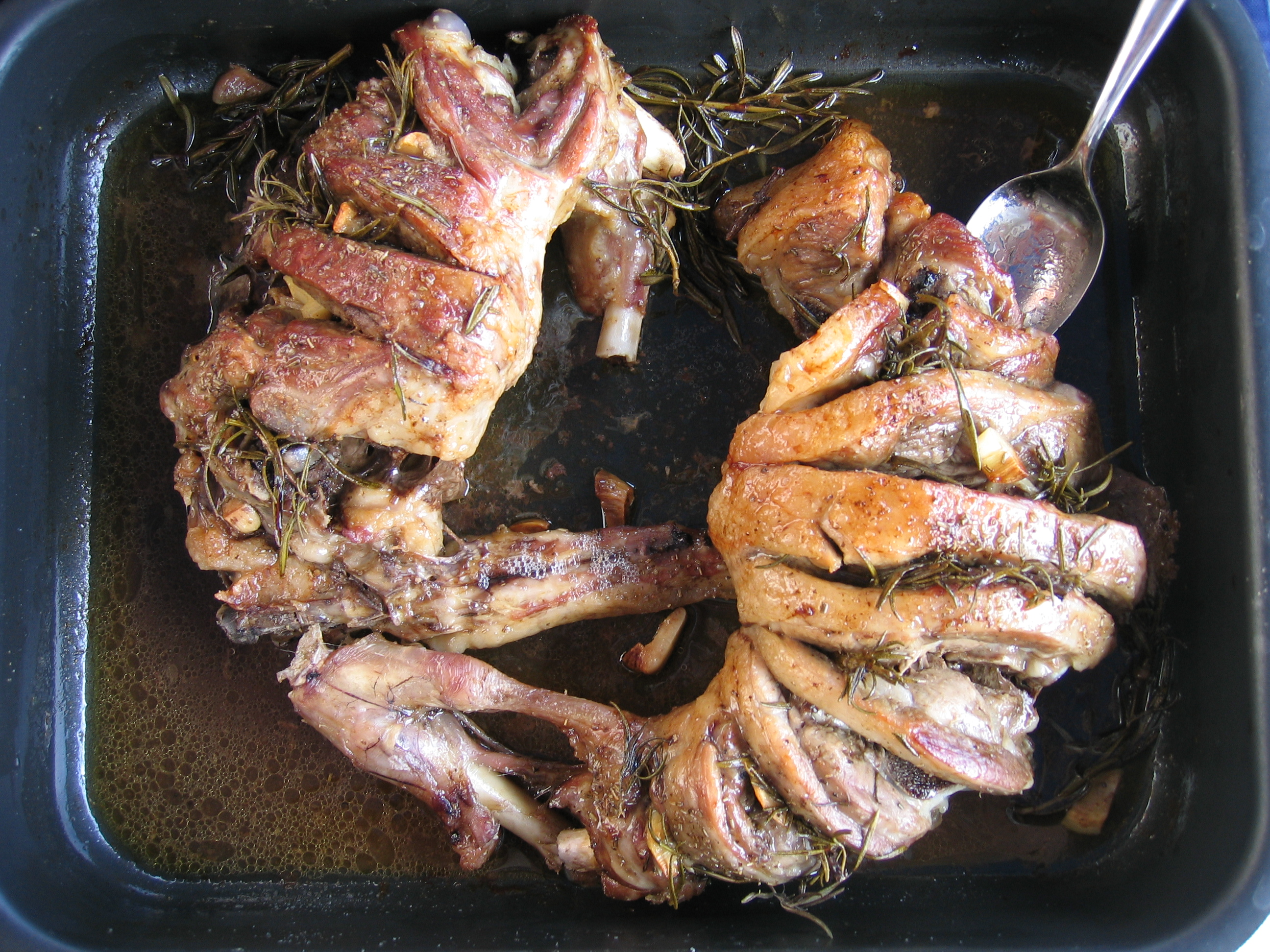
Abbacchio

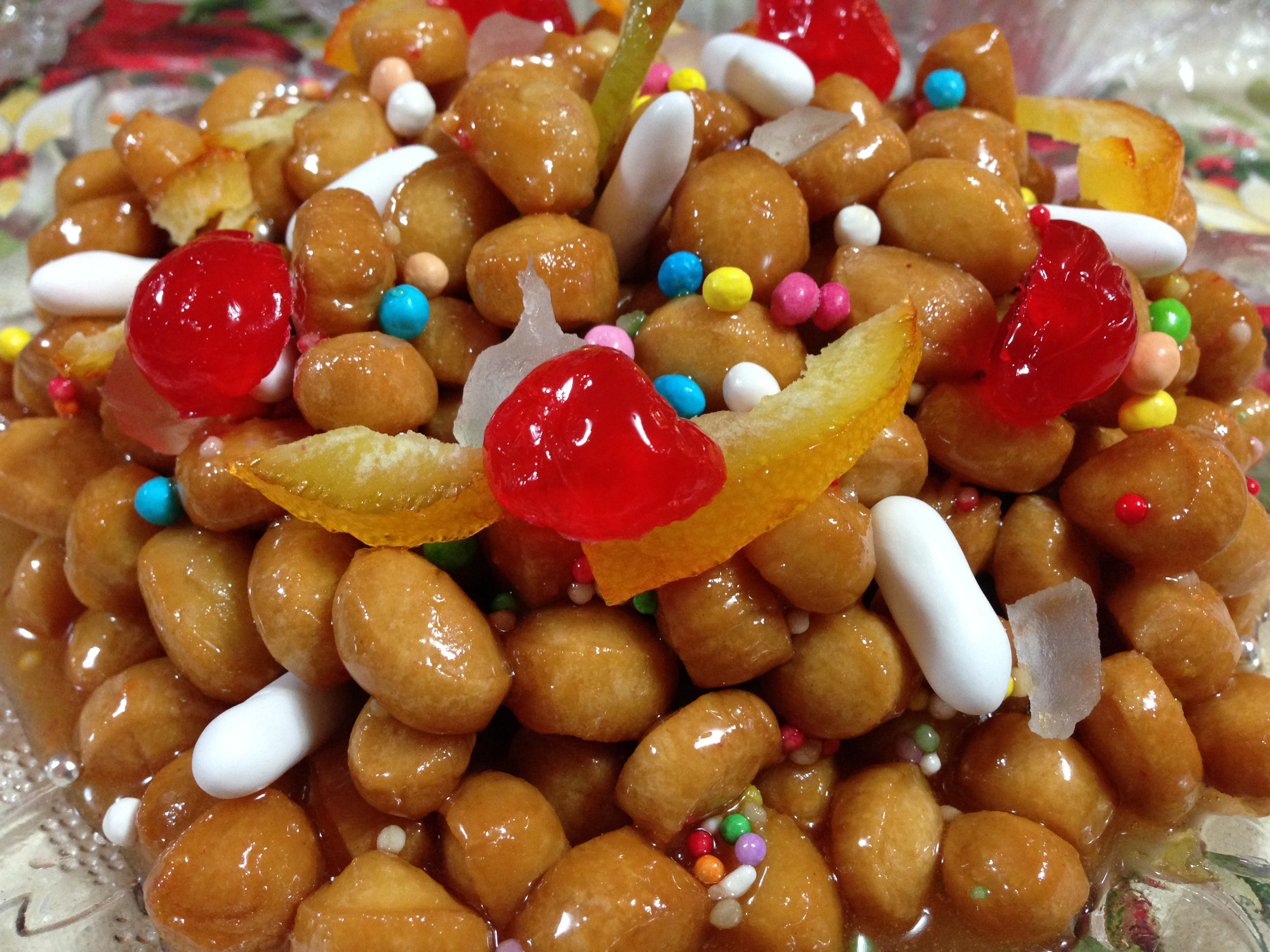
Struffoli

Christmas in Italy (Italian: Natale, pronounced [naˈtaːle]) is one of the country's major holidays and begins on 8 December, with the Feast of the Immaculate Conception, the day on which traditionally the Christmas tree is mounted and ends on 6 January, of the following year with the Epiphany (Italian: Epifania [epifaˈniːa]). According to tradition, the Christmas Eve dinner must not contain meat. A popular Christmas Day dish in Naples and in Southern Italy is capitone, which is a female eel. A traditional Christmas Day dish from Northern Italy is capon (gelded chicken). Abbacchio is more common in Central Italy. The Christmas Day dinner traditionally consists by typical Italian Christmas dishes, such as abbacchio, agnolini, cappelletti, Pavese agnolotti, panettone, pandoro, torrone, panforte, struffoli, mustacciuoli, bisciola, cavallucci, veneziana, pizzelle, zelten, or others, depending on the regional cuisine. Christmas on 25 December is celebrated with a family lunch, also consisting of different types of pasta and meat dishes, cheese and local sweets.

- Abbacchio (Central Italy).
- Agnolini (Mantua) – a type of egg-based stuffed pasta.
- Bisciola (Valtellina) – an artisanal Italian sweet leavened bread.
- Cappelletti (Emilia-Romagna and Marche) – a ring-shaped Italian stuffed pasta so called for the characteristic shape that resembles a hat (cappello in Italian).
- Capon (Northern Italy).
- Cavallucci (Siena) – a rich Italian Christmas pastry prepared with anise, walnuts, candied fruits, coriander, and flour.
- Eel (Southern Italy).
- Pandoro (Verona) – a sweet originally from Verona. Pandoro is today the most consumed Italian Christmas dessert together with panettone.
- Panforte (Tuscany) – a traditional chewy Italian dessert containing fruits and nuts.
- Panettone (Milan) – a type of sweet bread and fruitcake, originally from Milan, usually prepared and enjoyed for Christmas and New Year in Western, Southern, and Southeastern Europe, as well as in South America, Eritrea, Australia, the United States and Canada.
- Pavese agnolotti (Oltrepò pavese) – a type of egg-based stuffed pasta of the Lombard cuisine served hot or warm.
- Pizzelle (Ortona) – an Italian waffle cookies made from flour, eggs, sugar, butter or vegetable oil, and flavoring (usually anise or anisette, less commonly vanilla or lemon zest).
- Prosecco (Veneto)
- Mustacciuoli (Naples) – a dessert having a soft, spicy, cake-like interior covered in chocolate.
- Spumante (Piedmont)
- Struffoli (Naples) – a type of deep-fried dough.
- Torrone (Northern Italy) – a sweet containing whole hazelnuts, almonds and pistachios or only have nut meal added to the nougat.
- Veneziana (Milan) – a sweet covered with sugar grains or almond icing.
- Zelten (Trentino) – a sweet prepared using rye flour, wheat flour, dried and candied fruits, orange zest, and various spices.

== Jamaica ==
- Christmas (fruit) cake or black cake – a heavy fruit cake made with dried fruit, wine and rum.
- Sorrel – often served to guests with Christmas cake; Sorrel is made from the same sepals as Latin American drink "Jamaica," but is more concentrated and usually flavored with ginger. Adding rum is traditional at Christmas time.
- Curry goat
- Rice and peas – a Sunday staple, at Christmas dinner is usually made with green (fresh) gungo (pigeon) peas instead of dried kidney beans or other dried legumes.
- Christmas ham
- Chicken
- Pine and ginger

== Japan ==
- Christmas cake – the Japanese style Christmas cake is often a white cream cake, sponge cake frosted with whipped cream, topped with strawberries and with a chocolate plate that says Merry Christmas. Yule Logs are also available.
- Christmas cookies - A Christmas sugar cookie's main ingredients are sugar, flour, butter, eggs, vanilla, and baking powder. Sugar cookies may be formed by hand, dropped, or rolled and cut into shapes. They are commonly decorated with additional sugar, icing, Christmas sprinkles. Decorative shapes and figures can be cut into the rolled-out dough using a cookie cutter.
- Christmas cupcakes
- Crème caramel pudding in Japan - a crème caramel ubiquitous in Japanese convenience stores under the name custard pudding. Made with eggs, sugar and milk, sometimes served with whipped cream and a cherry on top.
- French fries
- Fruit parfait - Made by boiling cream, egg, sugar and syrup to create layers differentiated by the inclusion of such ingredients as corn flakes and vanilla ice cream. Topped with melon, banana, peach, orange, apple, kiwi, cherries and strawberries and whipped cream.
- Gingerbread house
- Ice cream
- KFC fried chicken – turkey as a dish is virtually unknown in Japan and the popularity of KFC's fried chicken at Christmas is such that orders are placed as much as two months in advance.
- Nabemono
- Poached egg salad
- Shōyu ramen
- Tamagoyaki - Japanese Omelette
- Yakiniku

== Korea ==
South Korea celebrates Christmas as a holiday after support of the united nations during the Korean War. Generally, Christmas themed foods similar to the ones found in western countries are enjoyed. Because North Korea bans any form of religion, Christmas is not allowed.

== Latvia ==
- Jāņu skābs
- Piparkūkas

== Lithuania ==
- Twelve-dish Christmas Eve supper – twelve dishes representing the twelve Apostles or twelve months of the year – plays the main role in Lithuanian Christmas tradition. The traditional dishes are served on December 24.
  - Poppy milk (aguonų pienas)
  - Slizikai ( or kūčiukai) – slightly sweet small pastries made from leavened dough and poppy seed
  - Auselės (Deep fried dumplings)
  - Herring with carrots (silkė su morkomis)
  - Herring with mushrooms (silkė su grybais)
  - Cranberry Kissel - thickened and sweetened juice normally served warm

== Malaysia and Singapore ==
- Bolo Rei – a type of cake
- Candy canes
- Christmas cake
- Christmas pudding
- Chap chye – a vegetable stew
- Devil's curry – from the Eurasian tradition
- Egg salad
- Steamboat – a hotpot dish for communal
- Jiaozi
- Kue semprong
- Pineapple tart
- Semur
- Vindaloo – a spicy Goan curry made usually with pork

== Malta ==
- Panettone – from the Italian tradition
- Fruitcake – from British influence
- Christmas/Yule log (cake) – a log (similar to a tree's) that is made from chocolate and candied fruits
- Mince Pies – from British influence
- Timpana – traditionally served as a starter
- Roast Turkey – from British influence

== Mexico ==
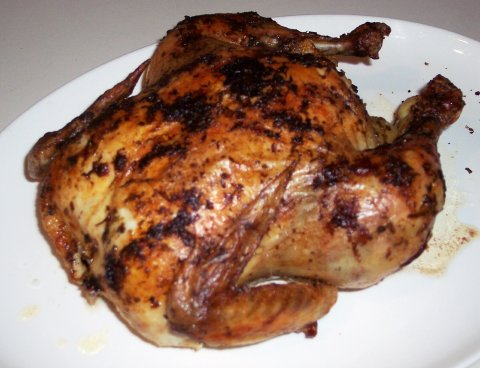
Christmas roast

- Meat
  - Roasted turkey – stuffed, roasted turkey served with gravy.
  - Glazed ham – ham glazed with honey or sugar dressed with cherries and pineapples.
  - Jamón (Spanish Dry-Cured Ham)
  - Lechon
  - Seafood
    - Bacalao – cod Basque style. Traditionally eaten in the central and southern states of Mexico.
    - Shrimp – cocktail or prepared in Torrejas (dried shrimp pancakes)
    - Octopus – cocktail
    - Crab
- Stews
  - Menudo – a Christmas morning tradition in northwestern states, Menudo is a tripe and hominy soup. Menudo is often prepared the night before (Christmas Eve) as its cooking time can take up to 5 hours.
  - Pozole – hominy soup with added pork
- Salads and other side dishes
  - Tamales – can sometimes replace the traditional turkey or Bacalao with romeritos, particularly in northern and southern parts of Mexico.
  - Ensalada Navideña – Christmas salad with apples, raisins, pecans, and marshmallows.
  - Ensalada de Noche Buena – Christmas Eve salad
  - Ensalada Rusa – potato salad, particularly popular in northern states.
  - Romeritos – also a Christmas tradition of the central region, romeritos are small green leaves similar to rosemary mixed generally with mole and potatoes.
- Sweets
  - Buñuelo – fried sweet pastry
  - Capirotada – bread pudding
  - Turrón
  - Cocada – coconut candy
  - Volteado de piña – pineapple upside-down cake. Turned-over cake with cherries and pineapples.
  - Carlota de Chocolate – cake
  - Mantecados and polvorones – crumbly cakes
  - Marzipan, almond cakes
  - Pan dulce – sweet rolls
  - Churros
- Fresh Fruit
  - Tejocotes
  - Guayabas
  - Caña de azucar - Sugar cane
- Drinks
  - Champurrado – thick hot chocolate
  - Chocolate – hot chocolate
  - Cidra – apple cider
  - Atole – corn based drink
  - Rompope – similar to eggnog
  - Ponche Navideño – a hot, sweet drink made with apples, sugar cane, prunes and tejocotes. For grown-ups, ponche is never complete without its "piquete" – either tequila or rum

== Netherlands ==
- Banket
- Mandarin orange
- Marzipan
- Mixed spice
- Mulled wine
- Oliebol (more widely considered as a New Years' classic)
- Speculaas
- Kerstkransjes
- Rollade

== New Zealand ==
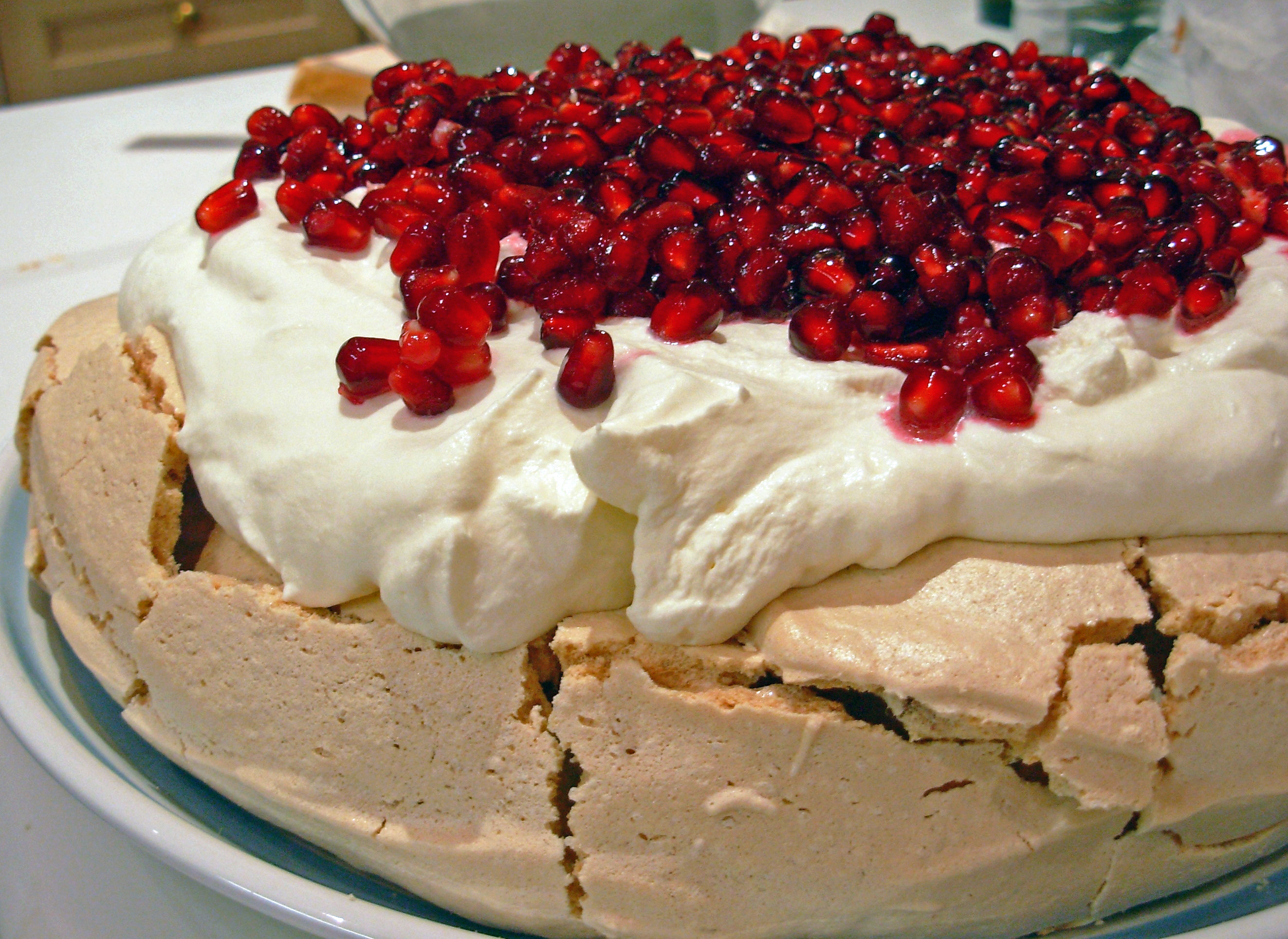
A homemade Christmas pavlova decorated with pomegranate seeds and Chantilly cream.

- Cherries
- Christmas pudding
- Christmas mince pies
- Ham
- Hāngī
- Lamb
- Lollies (candy) such as candy canes
- Pavlova
- Potato salad
- Seafood
- Strawberries
- Trifle
- Wine

== Norway ==
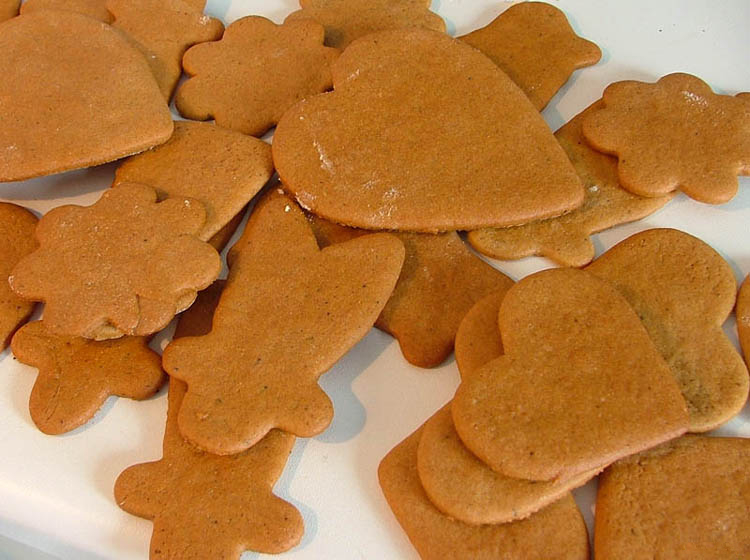
Scandinavian-style gingerbread

- Akevitt – Akvavit, a spirit flavored with spices like caraway and aniseed
- Gløgg – mulled wine
- Julepølse – pork sausage made with powdered ginger, cloves, mustard seeds and nutmeg. Served steamed or roasted.
- Pinnekjøtt – salted, dried, and sometimes smoked lamb's ribs which are rehydrated and then steamed, traditionally over birch branches
- Svineribbe – pork belly roasted whole with the skin on. Usually served with red or pickled cabbage, gravy and boiled potatoes.
- Risgrøt – Christmas rice porridge with an almond hidden inside
- Julebrus – Norwegian soft drink, usually with a festive label on the bottle. It is brewed by most Norwegian breweries, as a Christmas drink for minors.
- Julekake – Norwegian yeast cake with dried fruits and spices
- Sosisser – small Christmas sausages
- Medisterkaker – large meatballs made from a mix of pork meat and pork fat
- Raudkål/Rødkål – sweet and sour red cabbage, as a side dish
- Kålrabistappe/Kålrotstappe – Purée of rutabaga, as a side dish
- Peparkake/Pepperkake – gingerbread-like spice cookies flavoured with black pepper
- Lussekatter – St. Lucia Buns with saffron
- Multekrem – a dessert consisting of cloudberries and whipped cream
- Riskrem – Risalamande

== Palestine ==
- Knafeh
- Maqluba
- Mujaddara
- Warbat
- Zalabiyeh

== Panama ==
- Arroz con Pollo
- Tamales
- Ham
- Turkey
- Grapes
- Fruit cake
- Egg nog
- Potato salad
- Pan de Rosca
- Pan Bon
- Spaghetti

== Paraguay ==
- Apple cider
- Beef tongue sometimes covered in vinaigrette
- Cider
- Clericó (citric alcoholic drink made out of a mix of fruits and wine)
- Roasted chicken
- Potato salad
- Roast pork
- Sopa paraguaya

== Philippines ==
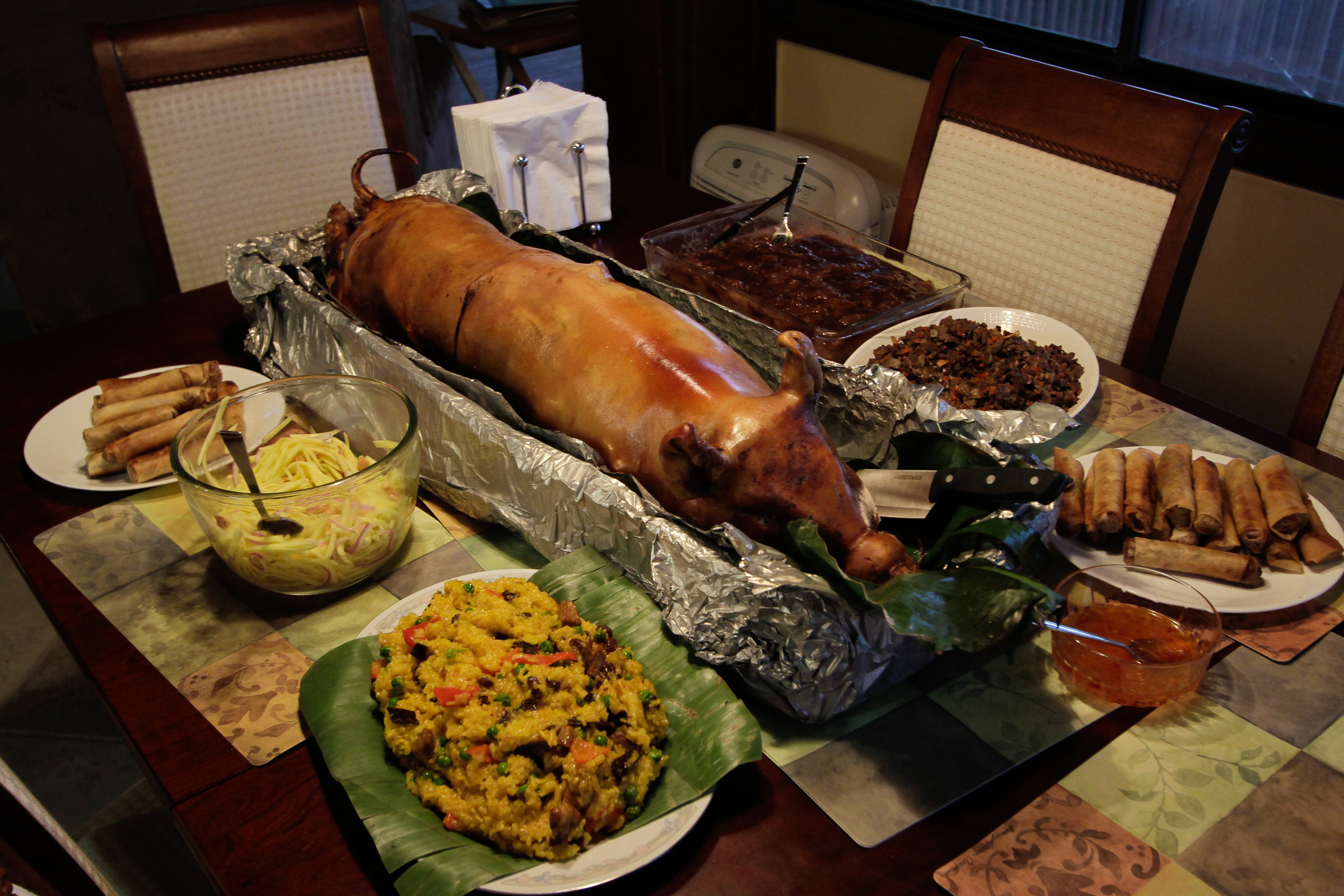
Typical traditional noche buena meal in the Philippines, with a lechón as the centerpiece

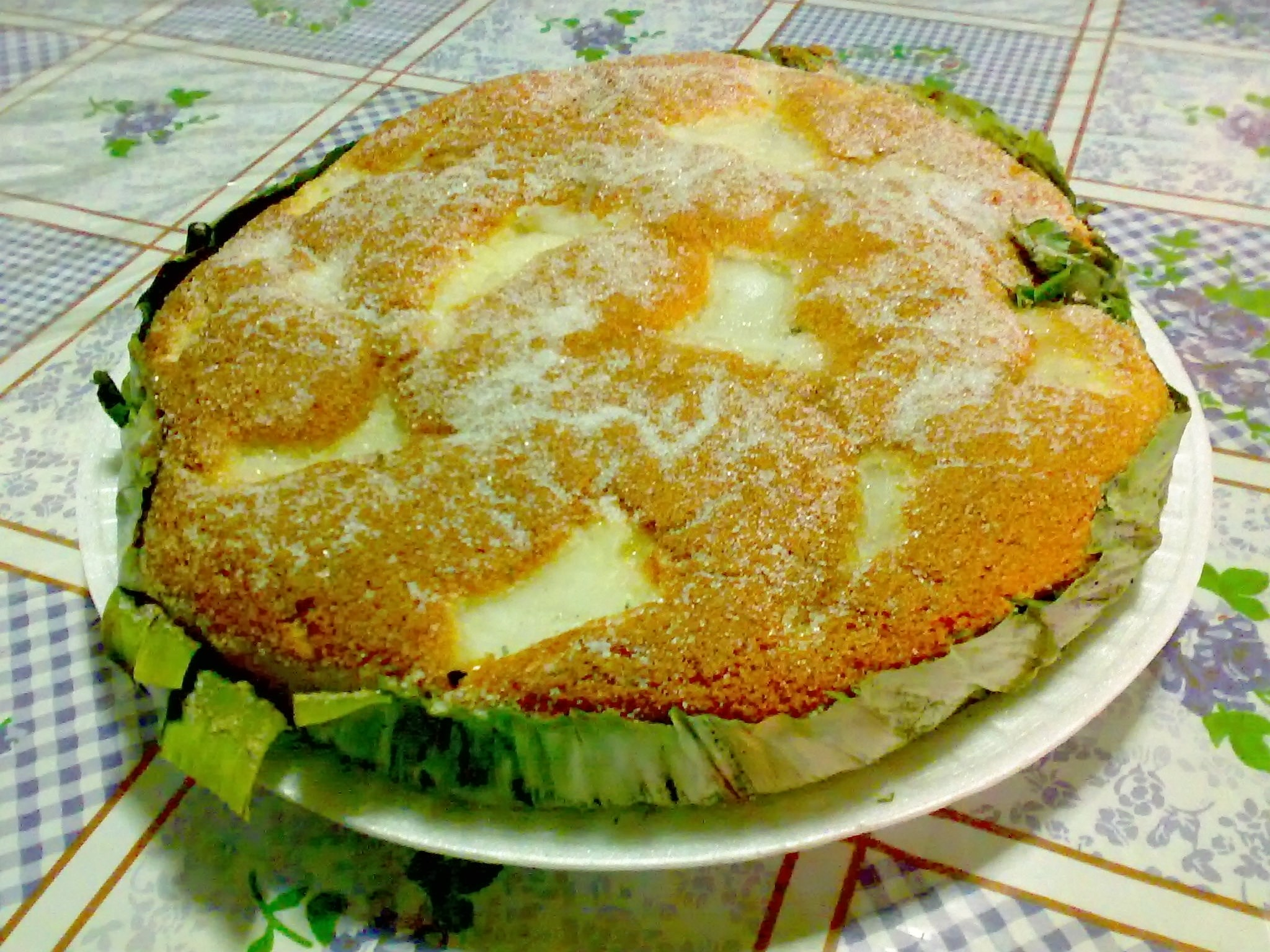
Large bibingka from the Philippines

- Adobo
- Almondigas (meatballs)
- Arroz valenciana
- Bibingka – traditional dessert made with rice flour, sugar, clarified butter and coconut milk; baked in layers and topped with butter and sugar.
- Biko
- Buko salad (young coconut salad)
- Caldereta
- Callos
- Castañas (roasted chestnuts)
- Champorado
- Chicken galantina
- Chicken pastel
- Churro
- Crema de fruta
- Embutido
- Fruitcake
- Fruit salad
- Filipino spaghetti
- Ham
- Hamonado
- Inihaw
- Kinutil
- Leche flan
- Lechon
- Lengua estofado
- Lumpia
- Mango float
- Macaroni salad
- Mechado
- Membrilyo
- Menudo
- Morcon
- Paelya
- Pancit
- Puto bumbong – a purple-coloured Filipino dessert made of sweet rice cooked in hollow bamboo tubes placed on a special steamer-cooker. When cooked, they are spread with margarine and sprinkled with sugar and grated coconut.
- Queso de bola (edam cheese)
- Relyenong bangus (stuffed milkfish)
- Sapin-sapin
- Suman
- Tsokolate
- Turon
- Ube halaya

== Poland ==
On 24 December, Christmas Eve, twelve dishes are served as a reminder of the Twelve Apostles. Polish people often do not eat meat on this day; instead, they choose from a variety of fish and vegetable dishes. The meal begins when the first star is seen.

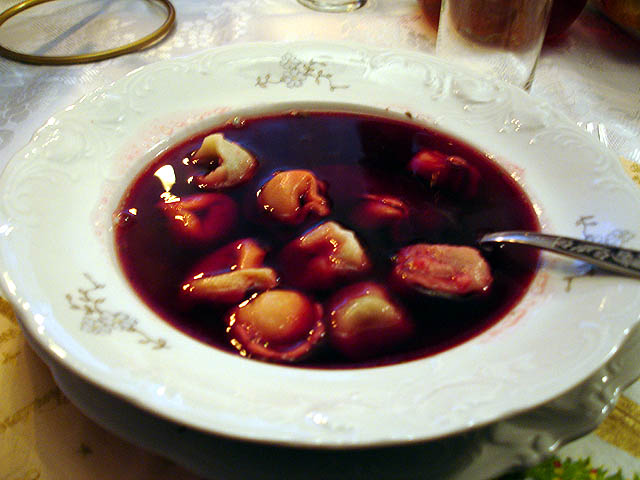
Barszcz with Uszka

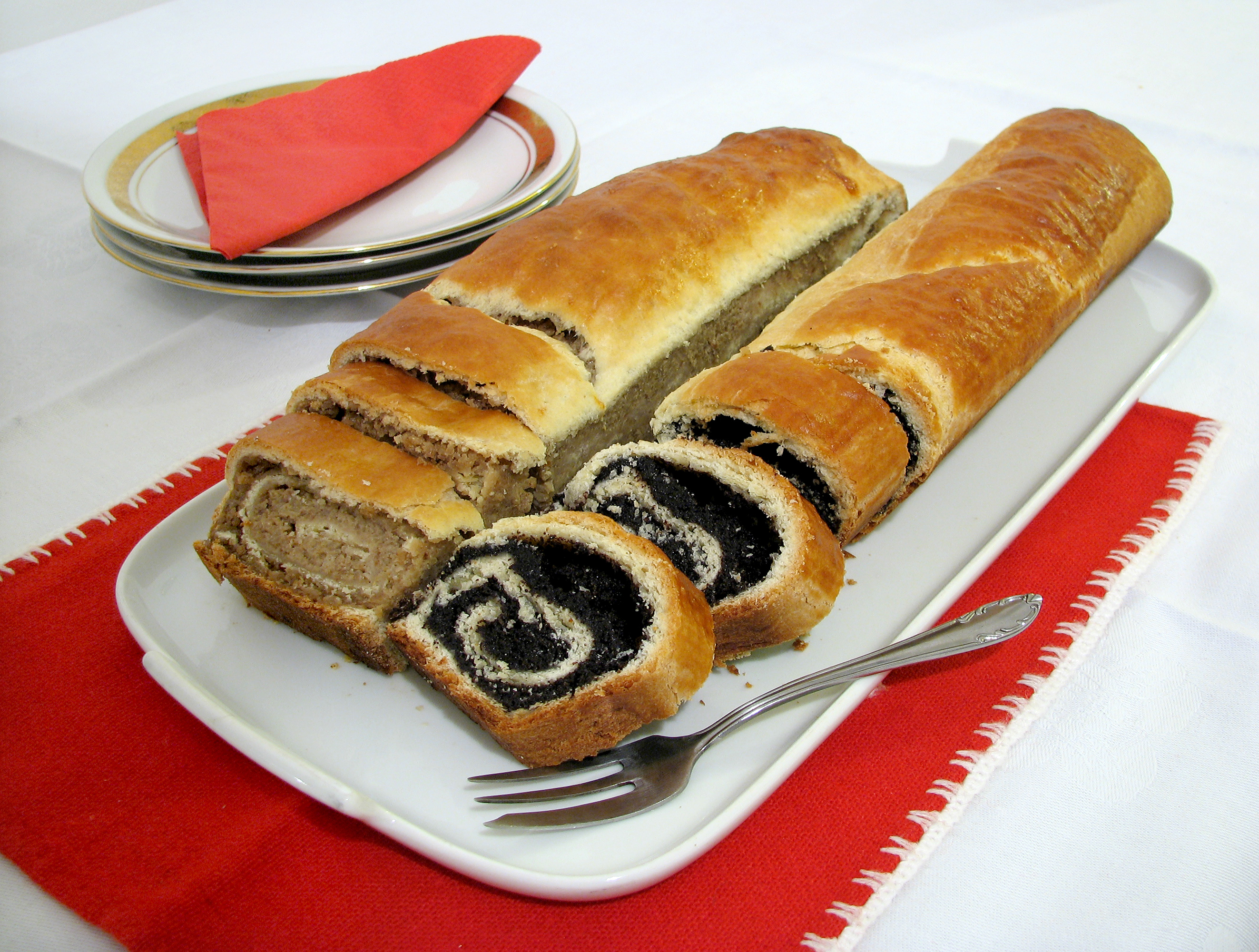
Makowiec

- Barszcz (beetroot soup) with uszka (small dumplings) - a classic Polish Christmas starter.
- Pierogi with sauerkraut and forest mushrooms; filled with cottage cheese and potatoes
- Zupa rybna – fish soup
- Żurek – soup made of soured rye flour and meat
- Zupa grzybowa – mushroom soup made of various forest mushrooms
- Bigos – savory stew of cabbage and meat
- Kompot – traditional drink a light, refreshing drink most often made of dried or fresh fruit boiled in water with sugar and left to cool and infuse.
- Gołąbki – cabbage rolls
- Pieczarki marynowane – marinated mushrooms
- Kartofle gotowane – simple boiled potatoes sprinkled with parsley or dill
- Kulebiak – with fish or cabbage and wild mushrooms filling
- Ryba smażona or ryba po grecku – fried fish laid under layers of fried shredded carrots, onions, root celery and leek
- Sałatka jarzynowa – salad made with boiled potatoes and carrots with fresh peas, sweetcorn, dill cucumber, and boiled egg, mixed with mayonnaise.
- Łamaniec – type of flat and rather hard pancake that is soaked in warm milk with poppy seeds. Eaten in eastern regions such as around * Białystok
- Makowiec – poppy seed roll

== Portugal ==
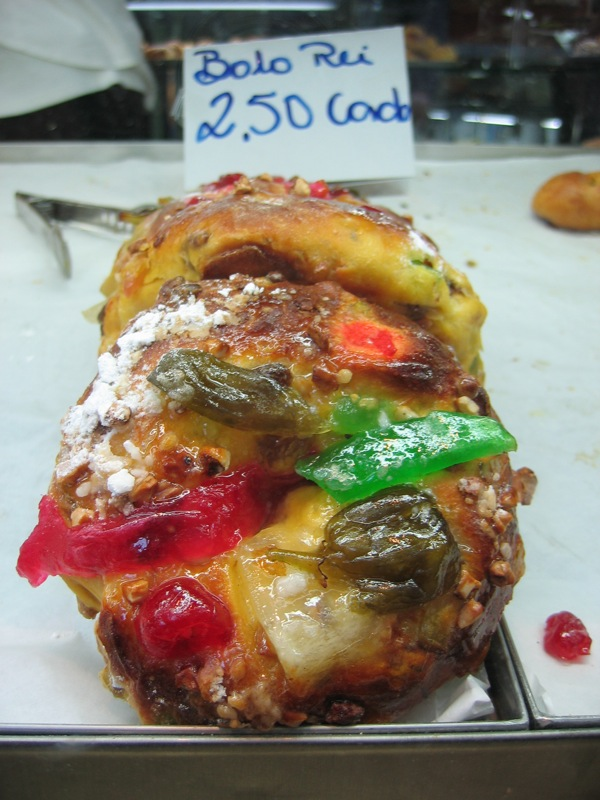
Bolo-Rei

- Bacalhau – codfish
- Cabrito assado – roasted goat
- Borrego assado – roasted lamb
- Polvo cozido – boiled octopus
- Polvo à lagareiro - dish based on octopus, olive oil, potatoes (batatas a murro), grelos and garlic.
- Carne de Vinha d' Alhos – mainly served in Madeira – pork dish
- Bolo de mel – mainly served in Madeira - Cake made with molasses
- Bolo Rei (king cake) – a beautifully decorated fluffy fruitcake
- Bolo-Rei escangalhado (broken king cake) – it is like the first one, but has also cinnamon and chilacayote jam (doce de gila)
- Bolo-Rainha (queen cake) – similar to Bolo-Rei, but with only nuts, raisins and almonds
- Bolo-Rei de chocolate – it is like the Bolo-Rei, but has less (or no) fruit, nuts, chilacayote jam and many chocolate chips
- Broa castelar – a small, soft and thin cake made of sweet potato and orange
- Fatias douradas – slices of pan bread, soaked in egg with sugar, fried and sprinkled with powdered sugar and cinnamon
- Rabanadas – they are like fatias douradas, but made with common bread
- Aletria – composed of pasta, milk, butter, sugar, eggs, lemon peel, cinnamon powder and salt
- Formigos – a delicious dessert made with sugar, eggs, pieces of bread, almonds, port wine and cinnamon powder
- Filhós / Filhozes / Filhoses – depending on the region, they may be thin or fluffy pieces of a fried dough made of eggs, honey, orange, lemon, flour and anise, sprinkled - or not with icing sugar
- Coscorões – thin squares of a fried orange flavoured dough
- Azevias de grão, batata-doce ou gila – deep fried thin dough pastries filled with a delicious cream made of chickpea, sweet potato or chilacayote, powdered with sugar and cinnamon
- Tarte de amêndoa – almond pie
- Tronco de Natal – Christmas log – a Swiss roll, resembling a tree's trunk, filled with chocolate cream, decorated with chocolate and mini – 2 cm Christmas trees
- Lampreia de ovos – a sweet made of eggs, well decorated
- Sonhos – an orange flavoured fried yeast dough, powdered with icing sugar
- Velhoses – they are like the sonhos, but made with pumpkin
- Bolo de Natal – Christmas cake
- Pudim de Natal – Christmas pudding, similar to flan
- Vinho quente – mulled wine made with boiled wine, egg yolk, sugar and cinnamon
- Turkey – on the island of Terceira, turkey has recently taken over as the traditional Christmas dish over Bacalhau, due to the influence of American culture on the island, home to the United States Air Force's 65th Air Base Wing.

== Puerto Rico (U.S.) ==
- Arroz con gandules – yellow-rice, pigeon peas, olives, capers, pieces of pork, spices and sofrito cooked in the same pot.
- Escabeche – pickled green bananas or cassava and chicken gizzards.
- Macaroni salad – with canned tuna and peppers.
- Morcilla – blood sausage.
- Pasteles – Puerto Rican tamle made from milk, broth, root vegetables, squash, green banana, plantain dough, stuffed with meat, and wrapped in banana leaves.
- Hallaca – tamale made from grated cassava and stuffed with meat wrapped in banana leaves.
- Pastelón – sweet plantain "lasagna".
- Pig roast – Puerto Rico is famous for their pig roast. It is also a part (along with arroz con gandules) of their national dish.
- Potato salad – most commonly made with apples, chorizo and hard-boiled eggs. Potatoes are sometimes replaced with cassava.

Drinks:

- Bilí – Spanish limes or cherries fermented in rum with spices, brown sugar, citrus peels, bay leaves, avocado leaves, often cucumber, ginger, and coconut shells.
- Coquito – spiced coconut eggnog.
- Coquito de guayaba - spiced guava eggnog with cream cheese or coconut milk added.
- Piña colada
- Rum punch – rum, orange liqueur, grenadine, ginger ale, grapefruit juice served with fruit, lemon and lime slices.
- La Danza – champagne with passion fruit juice, orange liqueur, lime juice, lemon juice, and strawberry juice.

Dessert:

- Arroz con dulce – Spiced coconut and raisin rice pudding.
- Bread pudding – soaked in coconut milk and served with a guava rum sauce.
- Dulce de cassabanana – musk cucumber cooked in syrup topped with walnuts and sour cream on the side.
- Dulce de papaya con queso – Fermented green papaya with spices and sugar syrup served with ausubal cheese or fresh white cheese.
- Flancocho – Crème caramel with a layer of cream cheese and Puerto Rican style spongecake underneath.
- Majarete – rice and coconut custard. Made with coconut cream, marshmallows, milk, rice flour, sugar, vanilla and sour orange leaves with cinnamon served on top.
- Rum cake
- Tembleque – a pudding made with cornstarch, coconut cream, sugar, milk, orange blossom water and coconut milk.
- Turrón – Sesame brittle or almond brittle.
- Mantecaditos – Puerto Rican shortbread cookies. Made with shortening, coconut butter, flour, almond flour, vanilla, nutmeg and almond extract. They are usually filled with guava jam or pineapple jam in the middle.
- Natilla – Milk, coconut cream and egg yolk custard made with additional cinnamon, cornstarch, sugar, vanilla, lemon zest and orange blossom water. Served in individual ramekins with cinnamon sprinkled on top.

== Romania ==
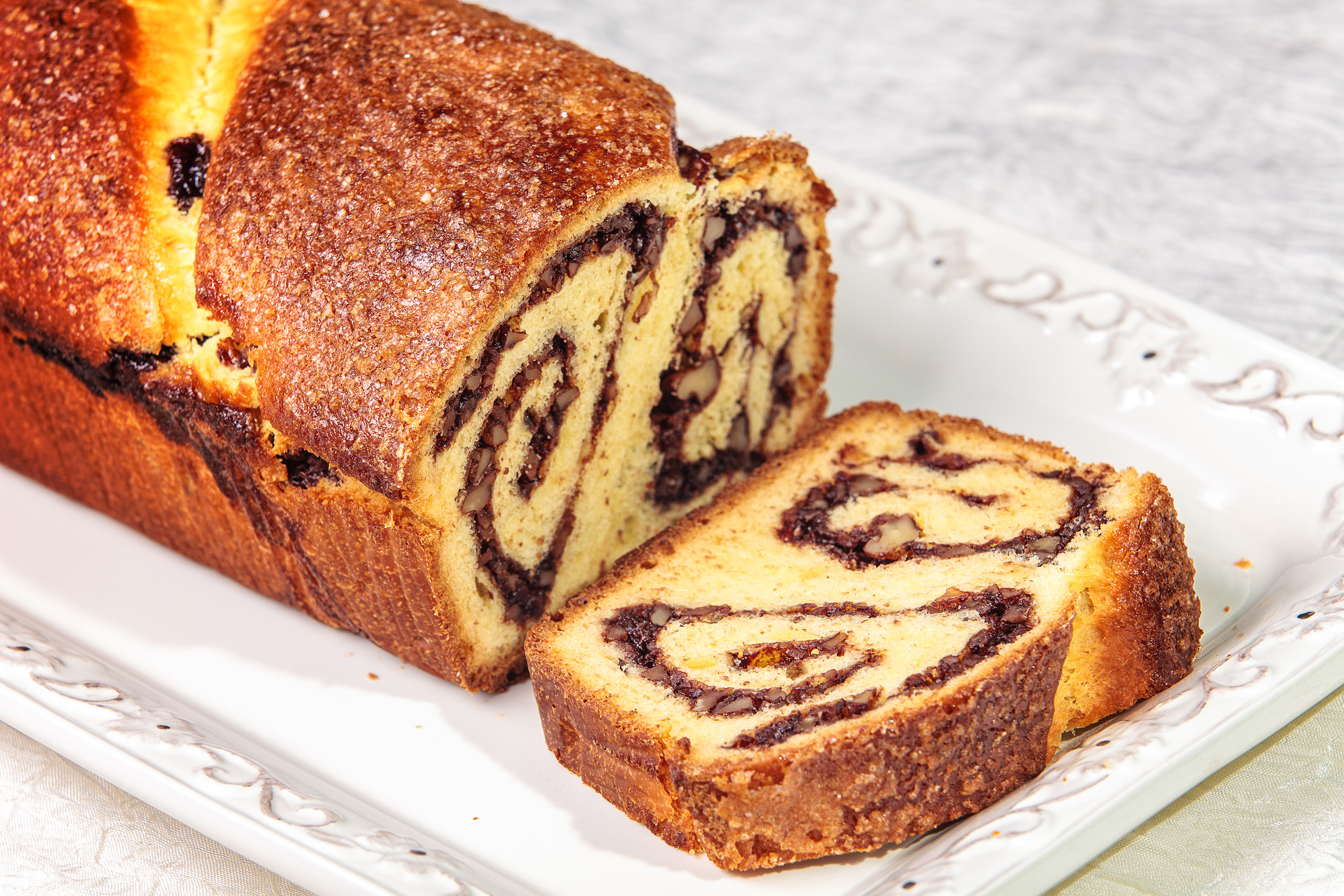
Cozonac

Romanian Christmas foods are mostly pork-based dishes. Five days before Christmas, Romanians are celebrating the Ignat Day, a religious holy day dedicated to the Holy Martyr Ignatius Theophorus, associated with a practice that takes place especially on villages scattered around the country: the ritual of slaughtering the pigs. And they are using everything from the pigs: from their blood to their ears. Five days later their tables are filled not only with generous pork roasts but also with:

- Piftie – pork jelly, made only with pork meat, vegetables and garlic
- Lebăr – liver sausages, a local variety of liverwurst
- Caltaboș – sausages made from organs
- Cârnaţi – pork-based sausages
- Sângerete – blood sausages
- Tobă – head cheese made from various cuttings of pork, liver boiled, diced and "packed" in pork stomach like a salami
- Sarmale – rolls of cabbage pickled in brine and filled with meat and rice (see sarma)
- Salată de boeuf – a more recent dish, but highly popular, this type of salad uses boiled vegetables and meat (beef, poultry, even ham). It can include potatoes, carrots, pickled red peppers and cucumbers, egg whites bits. Everything is mixed together with mayonnaise and mustard.
- Cozonac, the Romanian equivalent of panettone or sweet bread.
- Strong spirits: Palinka, Rachiu, Ţuică

== Russia ==
- Borscht
- Kutya

== San Marino ==
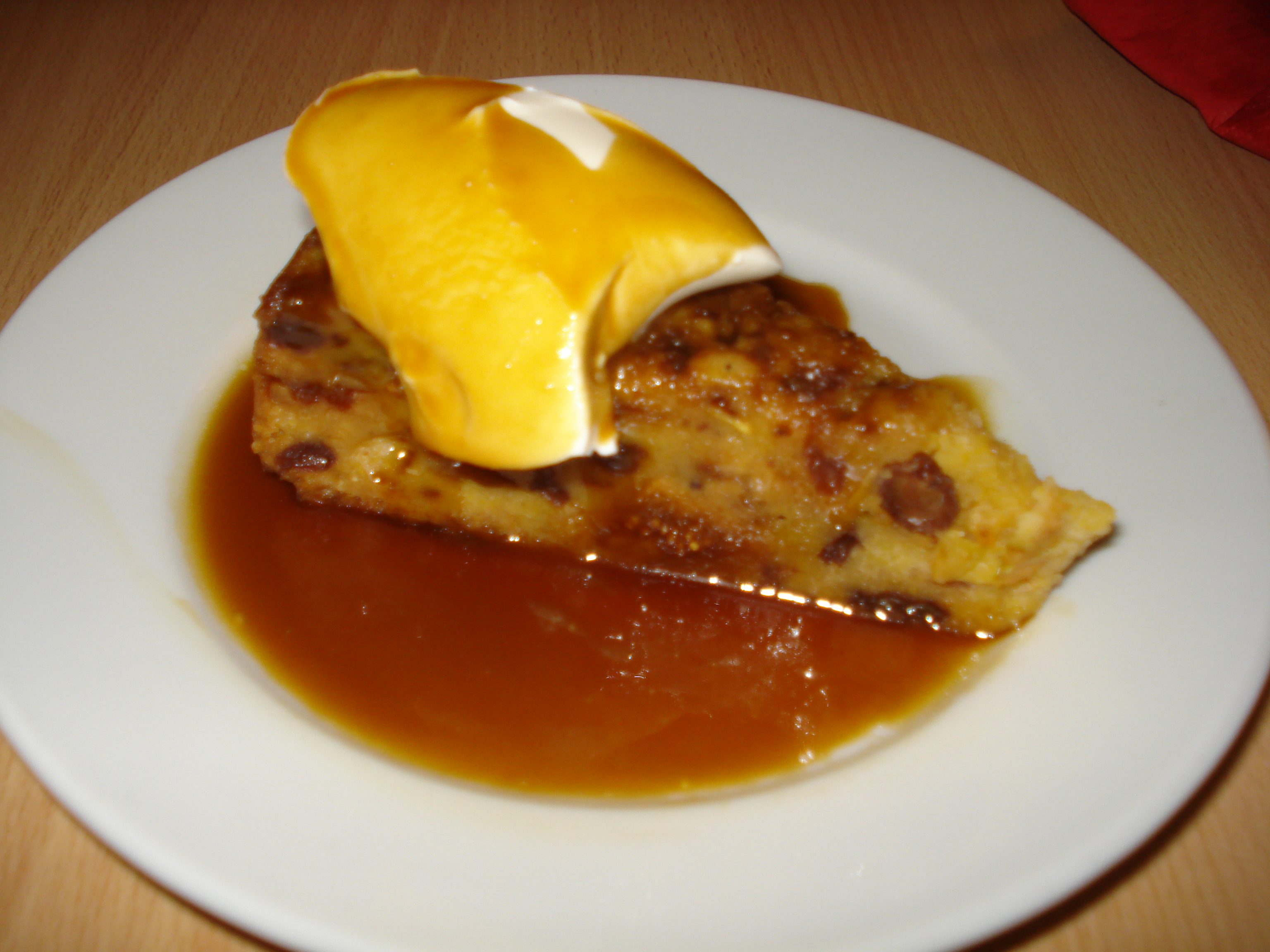
Bustrengo

- Bustrengo

== Serbia and Montenegro ==
- Česnica – Christmas soda bread with a silver coin to bring health and good luck baked in the bread.
- Koljivo – boiled wheat which is used liturgically in the Eastern Orthodox and Greek Catholic Churches.
- Riblja čorba for Christmas Eve

== South Africa ==
Christmas is in the summer in South Africa, so many summer fruits such as watermelon and cantaloupes are enjoyed at this time. Popular desserts include trifle, melktert and peppermint crisp tart. Many people in South Africa hold Braai for Christmas or New Year's Day.

Due to South Africa’s cultural diversity, Christmas meals vary considerably among different ethnic, linguistic, and religious groups, resulting in a wide range of festive culinary traditions.

Main meals include:

- Beef tongue
- Gammon
- Potato salad
- Garden Salad
- Turducken
- Turkey
- Braaivleis
- Boerewors
- Potjiekos
- Breyani
- Bobotie
- Meatballs
- Fried chicken

Sweet treats/Desserts:

- Trifle
- Fruitcake
- Mince Pies Influenced by British tradition, mince pies filled with dried fruits and spices are enjoyed over the holidays.
- Christmas pudding
- Ice cream
- Melktert
- Peppermint crisp tart – fridge tart made with peppermint crisp, caramel treat and tennis biscuits
- Yogurt tart – fridge tart
- Malva pudding
- Cookies
- Hertzoggies
- Lamingtons
- candy canes

Fruits:

- Watermelon
- Melon
- Mango
- Pineapple
- Strawberries

== Spain ==
- Jamón, jamón ibérico (Spanish dry-cured ham).
- Fish: oven gilt-head bream, oven sea bass, elvers.
- Seafood: Langostinos (king prawn), Shrimp, Lobster, Crab.
- Meat: Roasted turkey, Roasted lamb.
- Sweets:
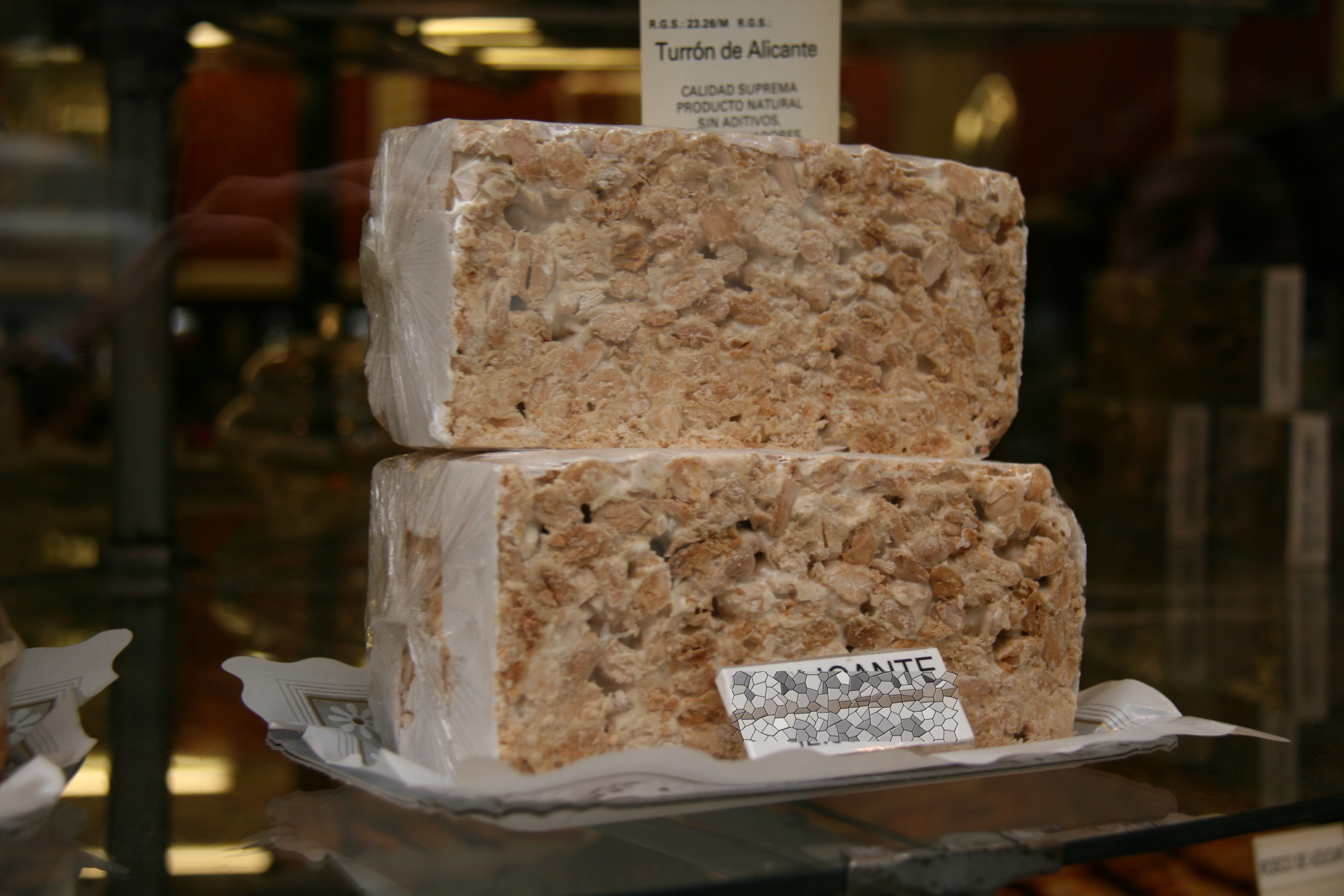
  Turrón
  - Turrón
  - Yema – egg-based dessert
  - Mantecados and polvorones – crumbly cakes
  - Marzipan – almond cakes
  - King cake known as roscón de Reyes in Spanish and tortell in Catalan.
  - Frutas de Aragón - a confit of fruit covered in chocolate
  - Peladillas - sugared almonds
  - Churros

cider

== Sri Lanka ==
- Kanji
- Lamprais
- Pol Pani
- Bibikkhan

== Sweden ==
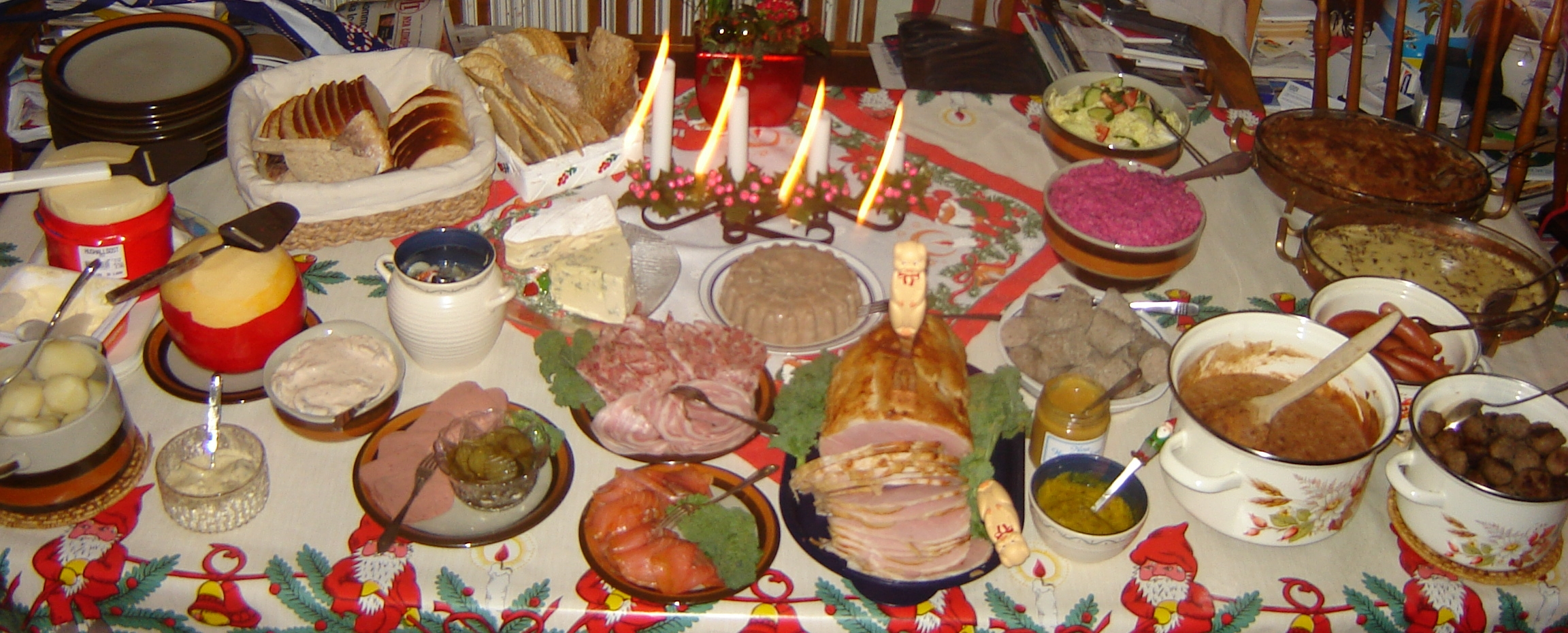
Julbord Christmas dinner in Sweden (common people 2006).

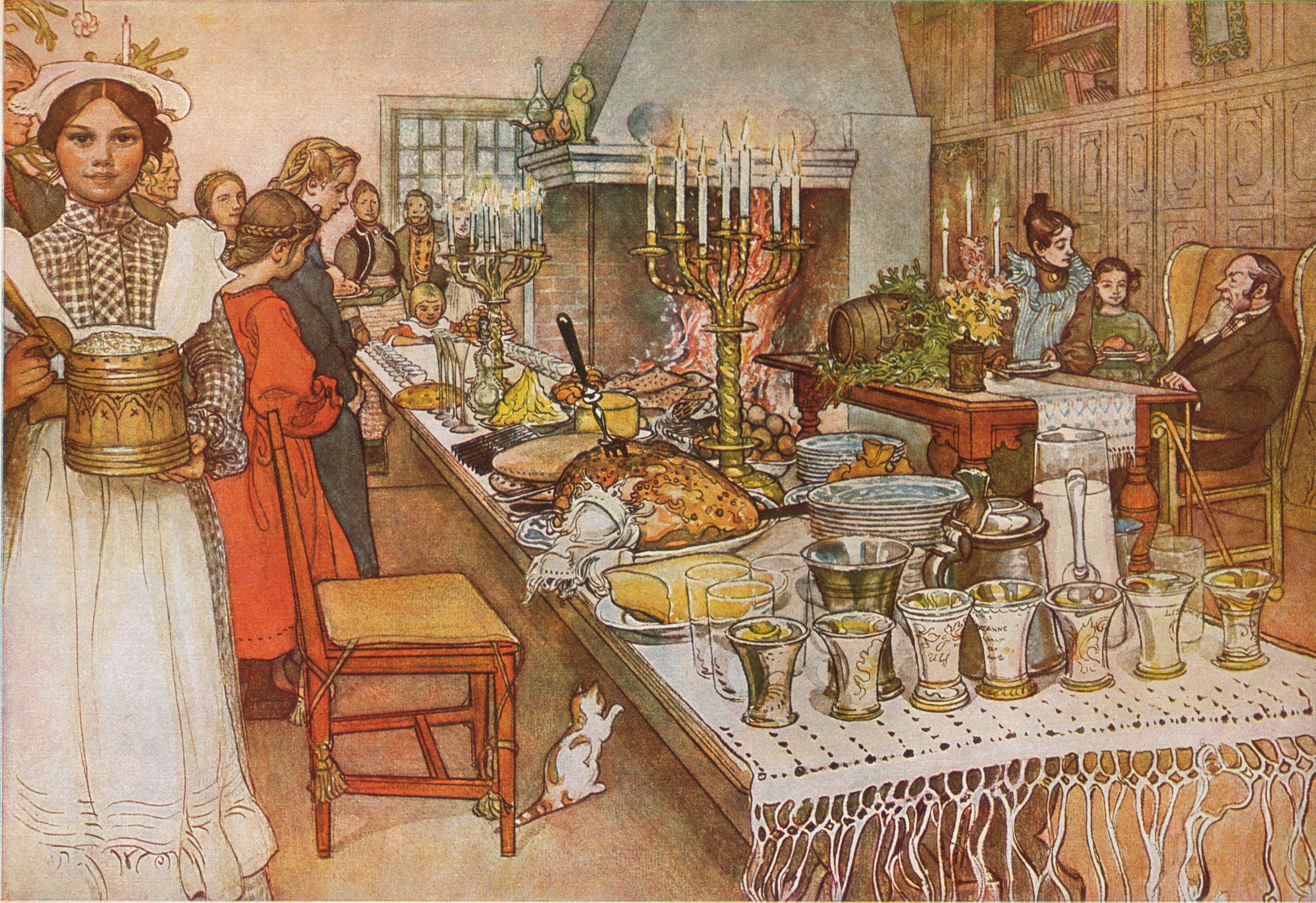
Julbord Christmas dinner in Sweden (upper middle class 1904).

- Julbord - Christmas smorgasbord ("Christmas table"), a catch-all term for all the dishes served during Christmas Eve:
  - Köttbullar – Swedish meatballs
  - Julskinka – Christmas ham
  - Dopp i grytan ("dipping in the kettle") – dipping bread slices in the ham broth after boiling the Christmas ham.
  - Prinskorv – small hot dog sausages
  - Fläskkorv – big pork sausage
  - Isterband – smoked fresh pork sausage
  - Revbensspjäll – spare ribs
  - Inlagd sill – pickled herring (usually of different types)
  - Gravad lax – lox
  - Janssons frestelse ("Jansson's temptation") – warm, scalloped potato casserole with "ansjovis" (a type of swedish spiced and pickled european sprat), not to be confused with anchovies.
  - Vörtlimpa – Swedish rye bread with grated orange peel made for Christmas, with or without raisins.
  - Knäckebröd – dry crisp bread
  - Rödkål – sweet and sour red cabbage, as a side dish
  - Grönkål – sweet and sour kale as a side dish
  - Brunkål ("brown cabbage") – cabbage flavoured with syrup, hence the name
  - Rödbetor – sliced beet root
  - An array of cheeses – bondost, herrgårdsost, prästost, mesost (hard goat milk cheese)
  - Mumma – mixed drink
- Lutfisk – lye-fish (whitefish) that has been boiled served with white gravy
- Julmust – a traditional, very sweet, stout-like, Christmas soft drink, originally intended as an alternative to alcohol beverage called Mumma
- Glögg – mulled wine
- Knäck or Christmas butterscotch – Christmas toffee
- Pepparkakor (gingerbread) – brown cookies flavoured with a variety of traditional Christmas spices
- Julost – Christmas cheese
- Julgröt – Christmas rice pudding with an almond hidden inside
- Lussekatter – Saint Lucy saffron buns
- Limpa bread – orange and rye spice bread

== Switzerland ==
- Anisbrötli
- Basler Läckerli
- Baumstriezel
- Cardon argenté épineux genevois
- Fondue
- Grittibänz
- Lebkuchen
- Mailänderli
- Pain d'épices
- Panettone
- Spitzbube
- Tirggel

== Thailand ==
- Khao khluk kapi
- Pad see ew
- Pad thai
- Tom yum

== Trinidad and Tobago ==
In Trinidad and Tobago traditional meals consists of generous helpings of baked ham, pastelles, black fruit cake, sweet breads, along with traditional drinks such as sorrel, ginger beer, and ponche de crème. The ham is the main item on the Christmas menu with sorrel to accompany it.

- Christmas ham
- Sorrel
- Pastelles also known as Hallacas
- Ponche de crème – a version of eggnog
- Black cake

== Ukraine ==
Orthodox and Roman Catholic Christians in Ukraine traditionally have two Christmas dinners. The first is a Lent Dinner, it is held on January 6 and should consist of meatless dishes. The second is a Christmas Festive dinner held on January 7, when the meat dishes and alcohol are already allowed on the table. The dinner normally has 12 dishes which represent Jesus's 12 disciples. Both Christmas dinners traditionally include a number of authentic Ukrainian dishes, which have over thousand-year history and date back to pagan times.

- Kutia
- Uzvar
- Varenyky
- Borshch
- Deruny
- Pampushky
- Holubtsi
- Makivnyk

== United Kingdom ==
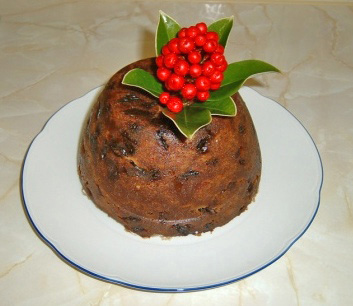
Christmas pudding

In the United Kingdom, what is now regarded as the traditional meal consists of roast turkey with cranberry sauce, served with roast potatoes and parsnips and other vegetables, followed by Christmas pudding, a heavy steamed pudding made with dried fruit, suet, and very little flour. Other roast meats may be served, and in the nineteenth century the traditional roast was goose. The same carries over to Ireland with some variations.

- Beef Wellington (alternative main course)
- Brandy butter
- Bread sauce
- Brussels sprouts
- Candy canes
- Chocolate yule log
- Christmas cake
- Christmas ham (usually a honey or marmalade glazed roast or boiled gammon joint)
- Christmas pudding
- Cranberry sauce
- Devils on horseback
- Dundee cake (traditional Scottish fruit cake)
- Gingerbread
- Hot chocolate
- Mince pies
- Mulled wine
- Nut roast (a popular vegetarian alternative)
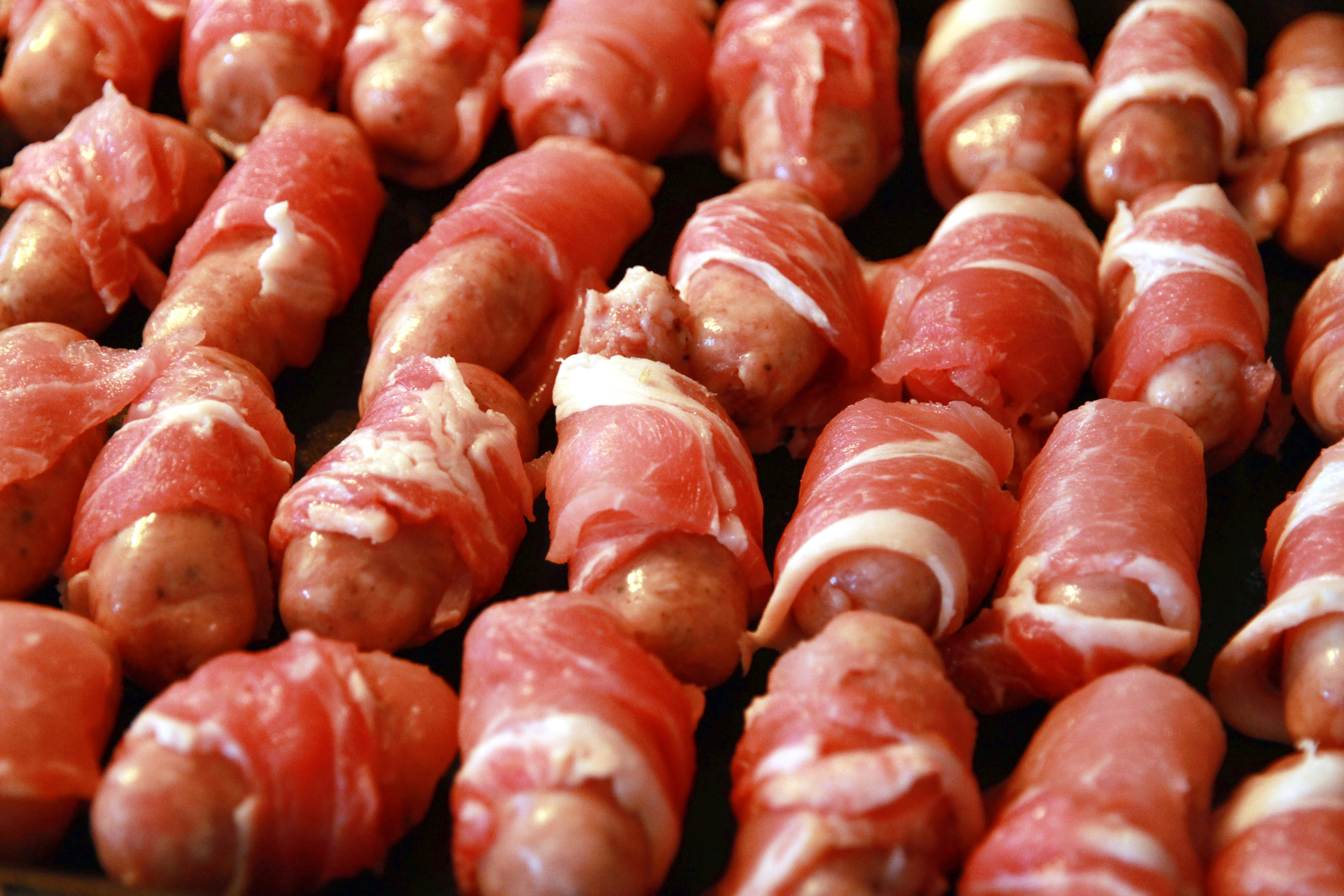
- Pigs in blankets
  Pigs in blankets (Chipolata sausages wrapped in bacon)
- Roast turkey
- Roasted chestnuts
- Roast duck
- Roast goose
- Roast pheasant
- Spiced beef (traditionally served in Ireland and Northern Ireland)
- Stuffing
- Trifle
- Tunis Cake
- Twelfth Night Cake (traditionally eaten on the final day of Christmas)
- Yorkshire Christmas pie (primarily historical)

== United States ==
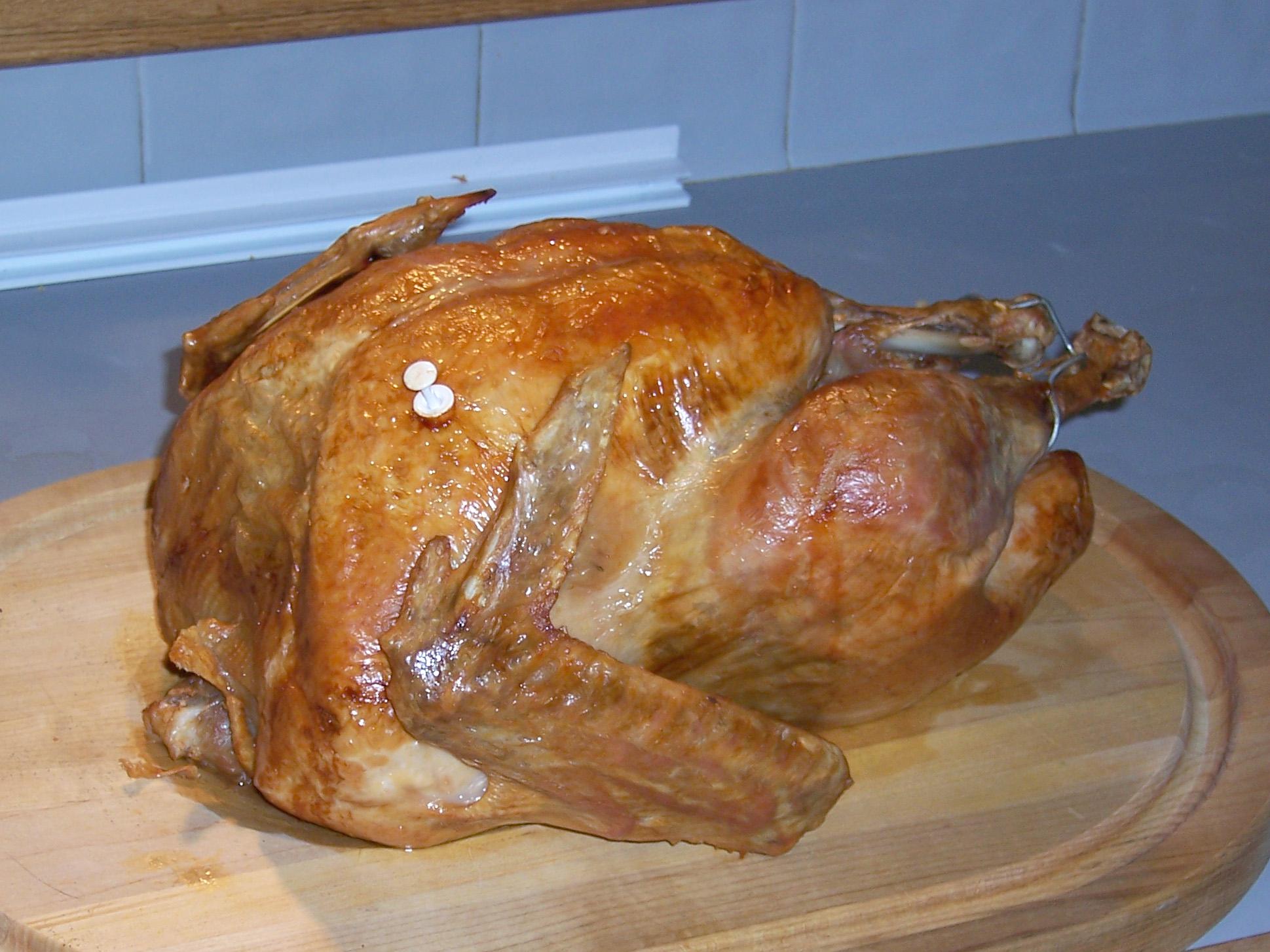
Roast turkey

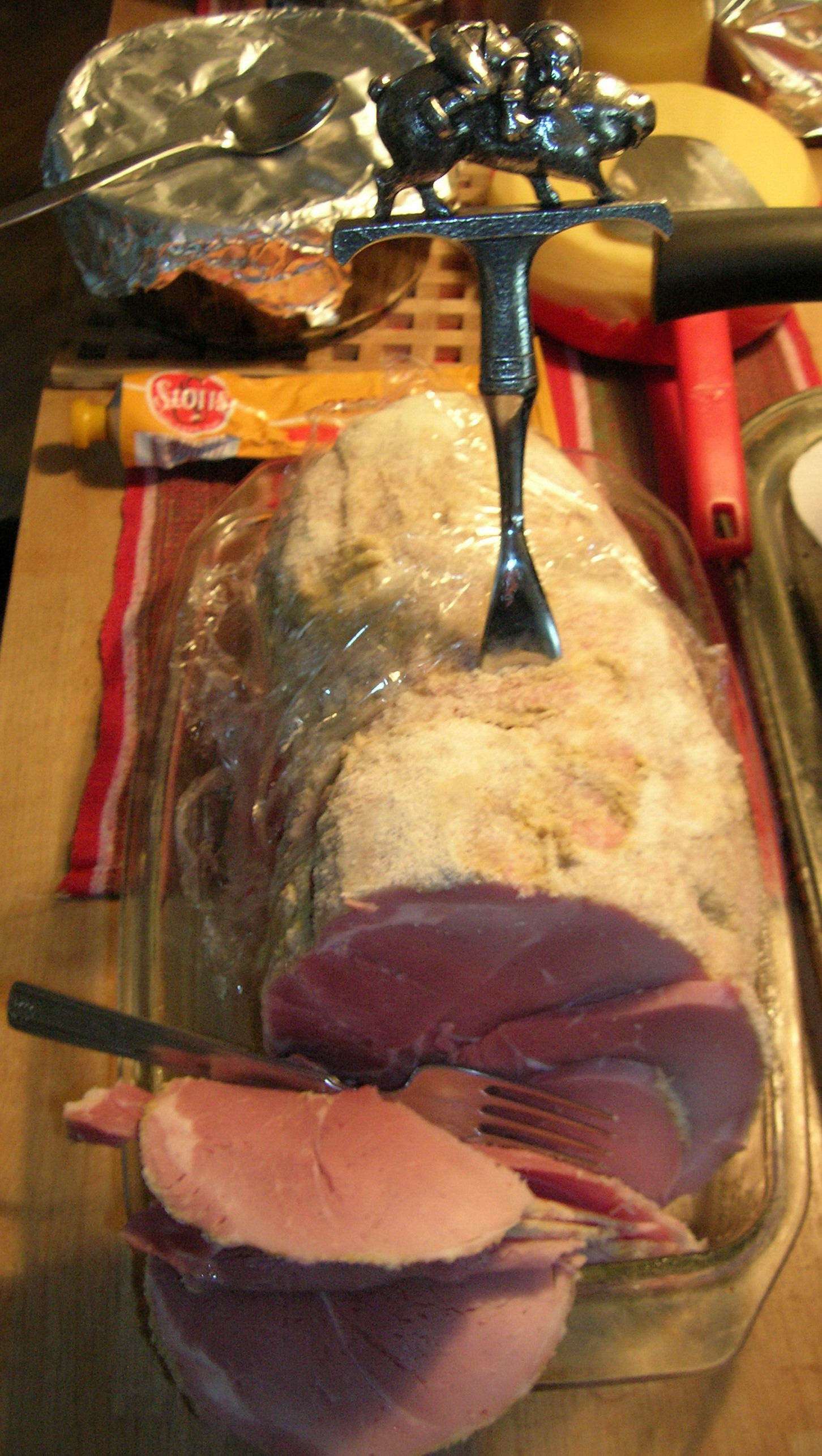
Christmas ham

- Apple cider
- Boiled custard
- Candy canes
- Champagne, or sparkling apple cider
- Chocolate fudge
- Christmas cookies
- Cranberry sauce
- Eggnog
- Fish as part of the Feast of the Seven Fishes
- Fruitcake
- Gingerbread, often in the form of a gingerbread house or gingerbread man
- Christmas ham
- Hawaiian bread
- Hot buttered rum
- Hot chocolate
- Mashed potatoes
- Mixed nuts, chestnuts, dried figs, dried dates
- Oyster stew, composed of oysters simmered in cream or milk and butter.
- Persimmon pudding
- Pie
  - Apple pie
  - Pecan pie
  - Pumpkin pie
  - Sweet potato pie
- Pork Loin
- Red velvet cake
- Roast Beef, often made using more expensive/luxury cuts such as Beef Tenderloin or Prime Rib
- Russian tea cakes
- Stuffing, sometimes referred to as “dressing.”
- Sweet Potatoes, often roasted with sugar and spices ("candied yams") or baked into a casserole
- Tom and Jerry
- Turkey, perhaps the archetypal main course in the traditional American Christmas Dinner.
  - Other fowl - especially duck, goose, chicken or pheasant - sometimes take the place of turkey as a main course, but are much less common.

See also: Thanksgiving Dinner (many dishes tend to be similar)

== Venezuela ==
Hallaca

- Hallaca – rectangle-shaped meal made of maize, filled with beef, pork, chicken, olives, raisins and caper, and wrapped in plantain leaves and boiled to cook.
- Pan de jamón – ham-filled bread with olives and raisins and often sliced cheese.
- Dulce de lechosa – dessert made of cooked sliced unripe papaya in reduced sugar syrup.
- Ensalada de gallina – salad made of potato, carrot, apple and shredded chicken (hen usually home or locally raised as opposed to store bought chicken).
- Pernil – commonly referred to as roast pork

== Vietnam ==
- Bò 7 món
- Bún thịt nướng
- Canh chua
- Chả giò
- Cháo
- Gỏi cuốn
- Lẩu
- Pho
- Thịt gà nướng
- Vietnamese tea

== See also ==
- Christmas dinner
