= Eierpunsch =

Warm, sweetened alcoholic, egg-based drink

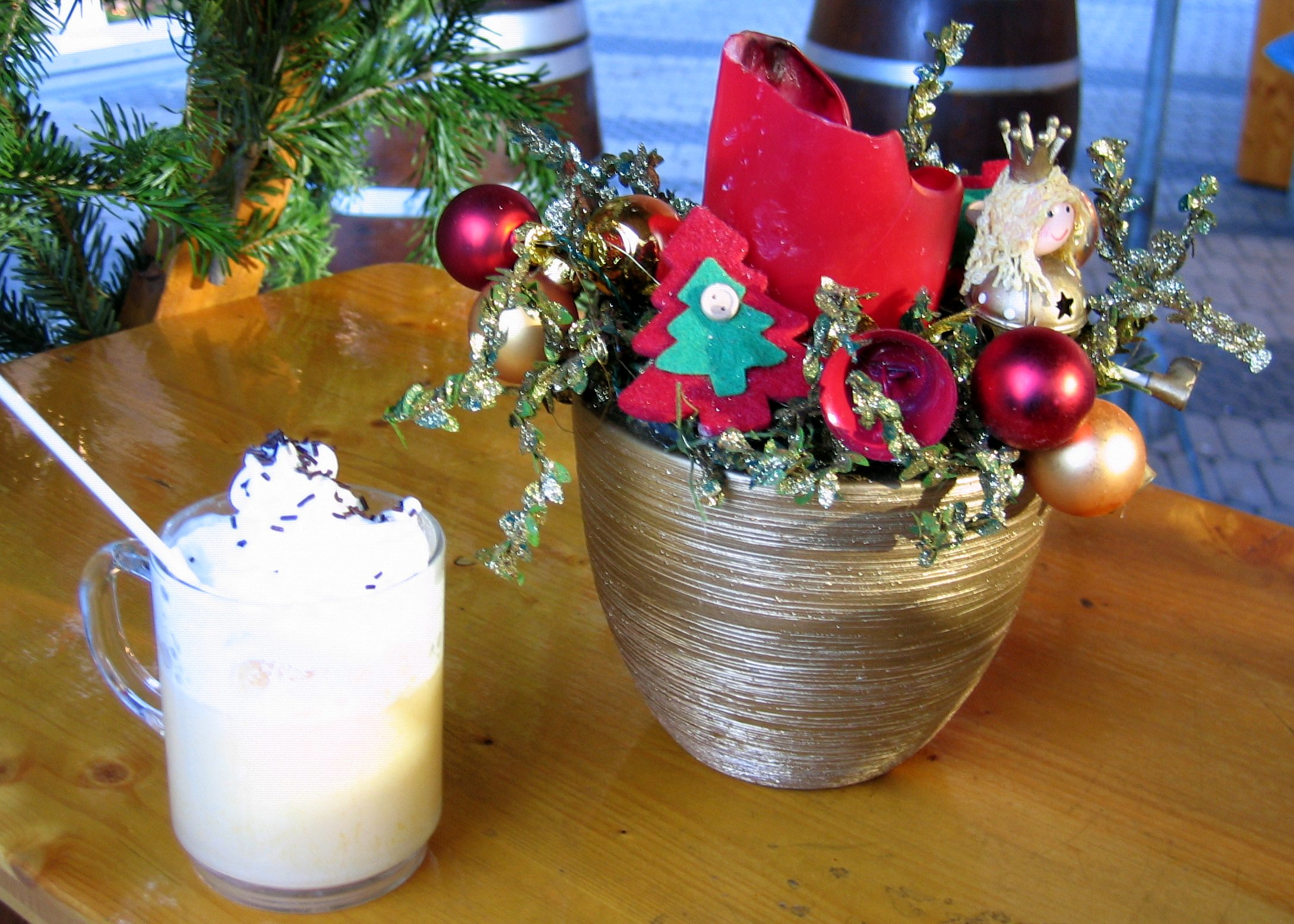

Eierpunsch (lit. 'egg punch') is the German name given to a warm, sweetened alcoholic, egg-based drink similar to eggnog. It is commonly a winter drink and can be found served in the popular Christmas markets of Germany and Austria. Eierpunsch is made with egg yolks, sugar, white wine and vanilla. Sometimes cream or custard can be added.

== See also ==
- Advocaat – Dutch alcoholic beverage featuring eggs
- Bombardino – Italian hot cocktail
- Coquito – Puerto Rican rum and coconut milk cocktail
- Eggnog – Sweetened dairy-based beverage
- Kogel mogel – Egg-based homemade dessert
- Ponche crema – Cream liqueur from Venezuela and Trinidad and Tobago
- Rompope – Eggnog drink from Latin America
- Tamagozake – Drink consisting of heated sake, sugar, and a raw egg
- Zabaione, also known as Zabaglione – Italian dessert made with egg, sugar, and wine
