= Kogel mogel =

Egg-based homemade dessert

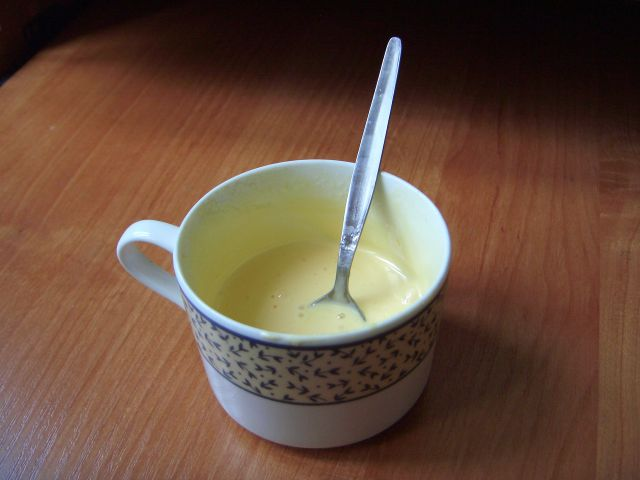
- A dish of creamy homemade kogel mogel
- Alternative names: Gogol-mogol, gogle-mogle
- Course: Dessert
- Place of origin: Jewish communities of Central and Eastern Europe, especially Poland
- Region or state: Europe
- Serving temperature: Chilled or room temperature
- Main ingredients: Egg yolks, sugar
- Variations: add orange juice for a taste similar to an Orange Julius

Kogel mogel (Yiddish: גאָגל־מאָגל, romanized: gogl-mogl; Polish: kogel-mogel [ˈkɔɡɛl ˈmɔɡɛl]; Norwegian: eggedosis; German: Zuckerei [ˈtsʊkɐˌʔaɪ]) is an egg-based homemade dessert once popular in parts of Europe. It is made from egg yolks, sugar, and flavourings such as honey, vanilla, cocoa or rum, similar to eggnog or zabaione. In its classic form it is served slightly chilled or at room temperature. Served warm or hot, it is considered a home remedy for sore throats. Variations include milk, honey and soda.

== History and etymology ==
Kogel mogel became known by this name by the 17th-century Jewish communities of Central Europe. It may have its roots in the Jewish code of law called the Shulchan Arukh where one is allowed to consume sweet syrup and/or raw egg on Shabbat to make one's voice more pleasant.

Vasmer's dictionary mentions different hypotheses on the origin of the name such as English hug-mug, hugger-mugger, or German Kuddelmuddel.

The dessert was made popular during the Communist era food shortages, including sugar. It is still eaten in northern and eastern European countries such as Norway, Sweden, Finland, Russia, Ukraine, Belarus, Lithuania, Poland, Germany and in the diaspora communities of these countries around the world.

== Preparation ==
The dish consists of raw egg yolks and sugar, beaten and ground until they form a creamy texture, with no discernible grains of sugar. In modern kitchens, it is often mixed in a blender until it changes color and becomes thick. A classic single gogl-mogl portion is made from two egg yolks and three teaspoons of sugar beat into a cream-like dish. Variations can be made by adding chocolate, vodka, rum, honey, vanilla, lemon juice, orange juice, raisins, whipped cream, or a number of other ingredients based on one's own taste preferences.

== Uses ==
Kogel mogel is often prepared as a transition food for babies moving from a cereal diet to one that includes eggs and other soft foods. It is also a folk medicine used for treating colds or flu, particularly chest colds and laryngitis. Kogel mogel is ranked highly among other traditional cold remedies such as chicken soup.

The traditional usage of kogel mogel as a home remedy for treating a sore throat is supported by research done in Israel. The simplest form of preparation as a remedy is with no egg, but only honey added to warm milk. More commonly, a single raw egg is added to a cup of warm milk and mixed with a tablespoon of honey.

== Cultural references ==
In the German translation of Lewis Carroll's Through the Looking Glass, Humpty Dumpty is called Goggelmoggel.

In the children's poems of Soviet writer Korney Chukovsky, Aybolit (1929), Doctor Aybolit treated sick animal children with gogol-mogol, which is well-known in Russia with a recipe identical to kogel-mogel.

Kogel-mogel is a Polish 1988 comedy of manners film directed by Roman Załuski, starring Grażyna Błęcka-Kolska and Ewa Kasprzyk.

The kogel mogel appears as a central object of a scene in the 2006 Polish film We're All Christs directed by Marek Koterski.

== See also ==
- Uovo sbattuto – Italian breakfast
- Eggnog
- Rompope – Eggnog drink from Latin America
- Advocaat – Dutch alcoholic beverage featuring eggs
- Zabaione, also known as Zabaglione – Italian dessert, or sometimes drink
- Coquito – Puerto Rican rum and coconut milk cocktail
- Eierpunsch – Warm, sweetened alcoholic, egg-based drink
- List of custard desserts
- List of desserts
- Ponche crema – Cream liqueur from Venezuela and Trinidad and Tobago
- Floating island – Dessert of soft meringue on crème anglaise
