= Advocaat =

Dutch alcoholic beverage featuring eggs

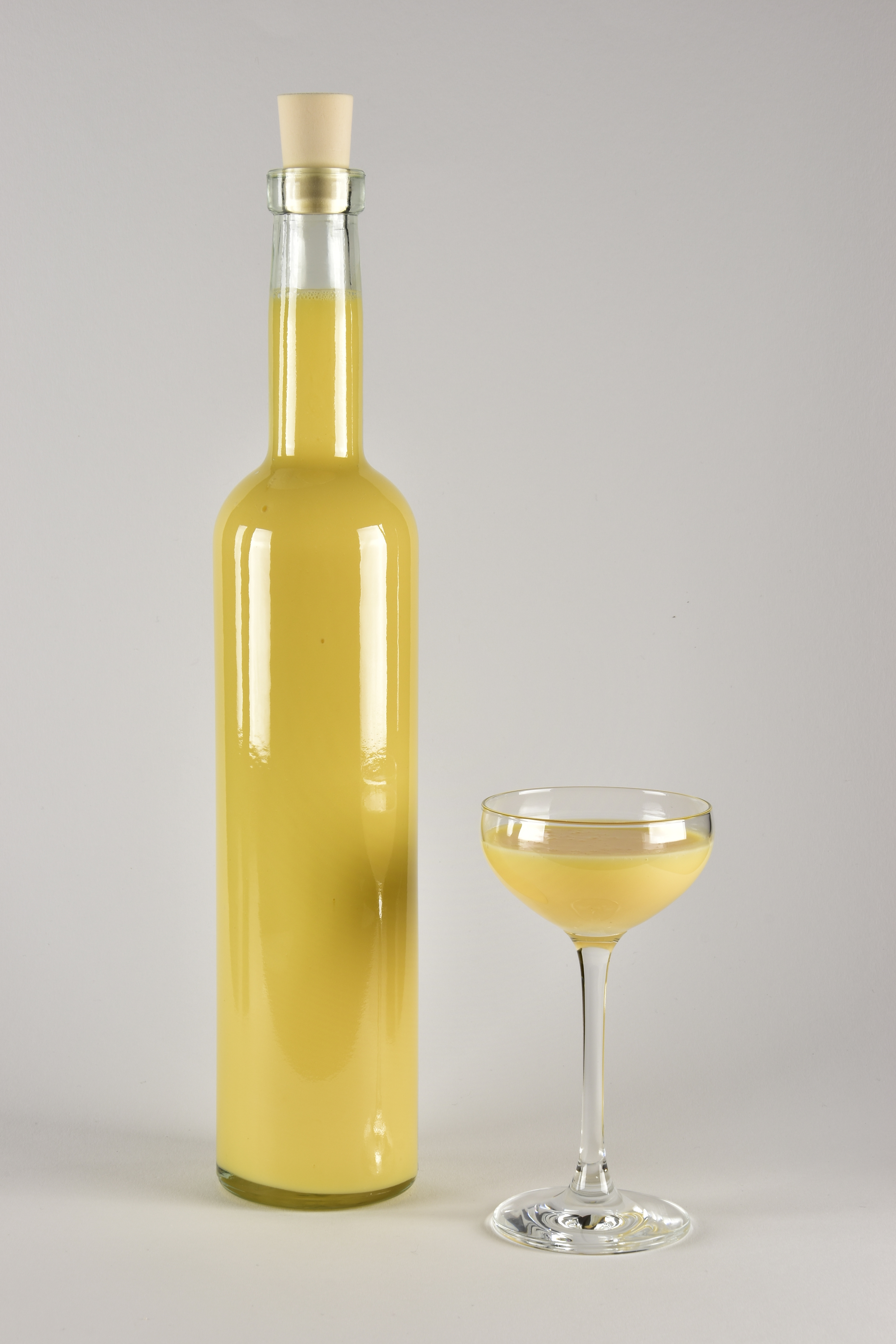
- Advocaat
- Type: Liqueur
- Origin: Netherlands
- Introduced: 17th century
- Alcohol by volume: 14–20%
- Proof (US): 28°–40°
- Colour: Yellow
- Flavour: Rich, creamy, smooth
- Ingredients: Egg yolks, aromatic spirits, sugar or honey, brandy, vanilla, cream or condensed milk
- Related products: Coquito, Eggnog, Eierpunsch, Kogel mogel, Pisco sour, Ponche crema, Rompope

Advocaat (/ˈædvəkɑː/ AD-və-kah, Dutch: [ɑtfoːˈkaːt]) or advocatenborrel is a traditional Dutch alcoholic beverage made from eggs, sugar, and brandy. The rich and creamy drink has a smooth, custard-like consistency. The typical alcohol content is generally between 14% and 20% ABV. Its contents may be a blend of egg yolks, aromatic spirits, sugar or honey, brandy, vanilla, and sometimes cream (or condensed milk). Notable makers of advocaat include the Belgian and Dutch Filliers, Warninks, Bols, DeKuyper (in two varieties), Verpoorten and Croatian Darna Ovo Liker.

== Etymology ==
Two theories have been proposed about the origins of "advocaat".

Poster 'Advokaat' for Distillery Vliegen in Hasselt, collection in Jenevermuseum Hasselt

According to several makers, such as Verpoorten and Bols, and the Oxford Companion to Sugar and Sweets, its origins can be traced back to "abacate", an alcoholic beverage of the indigenous people in Brazil, which was made with avocado. Dutch colonials of northern Brazil introduced this beverage to Europe as "advocat/advocaat". As avocados could not grow in northern Europe, they were replaced with egg yolk, thought to have a similar taste and consistency, and the name derived from the avocado stuck, although the drink no longer contains any.

Advocaat is also the Dutch word for 'lawyer' in the sense of 'solicitor'. As the name of the drink, it is short for advocatenborrel, or 'lawyers' drink'. Borrel is Dutch for a small alcoholic beverage (liqueur, brandy, etc. but not beer or wine) consumed slowly during a social gathering or an informal occasion where colleagues meet for light conversation with beer and wine. According to the 1882 edition of the Woordenboek der Nederlandsche taal ('Dictionary of the Dutch Language'), it is zo genoemd als een goed smeersel voor de keel, en dus bijzonder dienstig geacht voor een advocaat, die in 't openbaar het woord moet voeren ("so named as a good lubricant for the throat, and thus considered especially useful for a lawyer, who must speak in public").

== History ==
In 1828, J.G. Cooymans started a distillery in downtown 's-Hertogenbosch. There he developed the egg drink "advocaat". In 1876, the Antwerp distiller Eugen Verpoorten established a distillery in Heinsberg near Aachen, Germany, which made an egg liqueur (Eierlikör in German) using eggs, sugar, distilled alcohol, and other ingredients.

== Types and uses ==
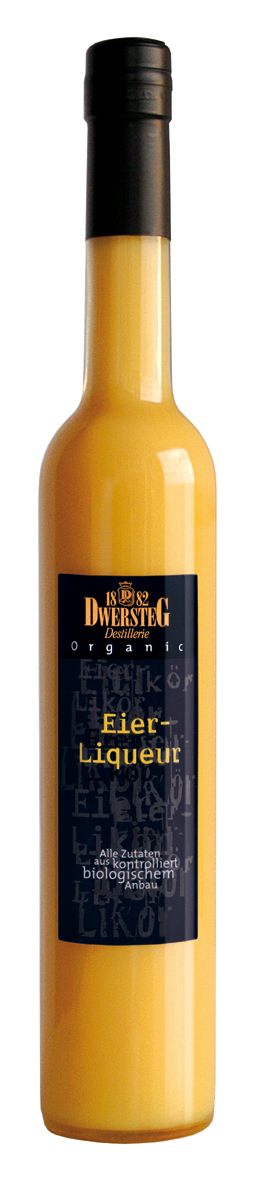
A bottle of advocaat of German origin

Jars and wide-mouth bottles of thick advocaat are sold mainly in the Netherlands and Belgium, though may be available in Germany, Austria, and South Africa. Further exports are of a more liquid version.

In particular, the original thick variety, i.e., without albumen, is used as a waffle, pancake or poffertjes topping, as an ingredient in ice cream, custards, pastries and similar desserts, or as an apéritif or digestif. The latter, possibly topped with whipped cream and occasionally sprinkled with a touch of cocoa powder, is served in a very tiny bowl or small glass and eaten with a teaspoon. In Belgian restaurants and taverns, it may be served as a complementary accompaniment to coffee.

In the export variety, both parts of the eggs are used. A popular cocktail using advocaat is the Snowball: a mixture of advocaat, sparkling lemonade and sometimes (although this is not required) lime juice that is often consumed at Christmas time. Another is the Fluffy duck, made with rum. Another advocaat-based beverage is the Bombardino, a drink commonly found in Italian ski resorts, particularly the Italian Alps, made by mixing advocaat, brandy, and whipped cream.

== Related drinks ==
The Polish equivalent, ajerkoniak (German: eier 'eggs' and French: cognac), is based on vodka instead of brandy, despite what the name may suggest.

Rompope of Mexico and sabajón of Colombia are very similar liqueurs based on egg yolk and vanilla. Some varieties have additional flavourings.

== See also ==
- Coquito – Puerto Rican rum and coconut milk cocktail
- Eggnog – Creamy dairy-based beverage
- Flip – Class of mixed drinks
- Eierpunsch – Warm, sweetened alcoholic, egg-based drink
- Kogel mogel – Egg-based homemade dessert
- Pisco sour – Cocktail in Chilean and Peruvian cuisine
- Ponche crema – Cream liqueur from Venezuela and Trinidad and Tobago
- Rompope – Eggnog drink from Latin America
- Tamagozake – Drink consisting of heated sake, sugar, and raw egg
- Zabaione, also known as Zabaglione – Italian dessert, or sometimes drink
