= Caprio =

Caprio is an Italian surname. Notable people with the surname include:

- Anthony S. Caprio, American scholar
- David Caprio (born 1967), American attorney
- Frank Caprio (1936–2025), American judge
- Frank T. Caprio (born 1966), American politician
- Giuseppe Caprio (1914–2005), Italian cardinal
- Hardy Caprio (born 1996), Sierra Leonean rapper, singer, songwriter, and record producer
- John-Michael Caprio (1947–1997), American conductor and organist
- Mino Caprio (born 1955), Italian actor and voice actor

== See also ==
- Caprio (company), drink and beverage company based in Poland
- Leonardo DiCaprio (born 1974), American actor
