= Caprio (company) =

Polish fruit beverage company

- Type: Soft drink
- Manufacturer: Maspex
- Country of origin: Poland
- Introduced: 1996.
- Variants: Caprio Plus

Caprio is a fruit beverage company based in Poland that produces low price drinks. Caprio drinks are available in Poland and in other European countries. In Romania and Bulgaria, they are sold under the brand Ciao. In Poland and Slovakia, Caprio is the market leader, number two in the Czech Republic for economic beverages. The company is owned by the Maspex firm which owns several other brands.

The beverages are available in a variety of flavours and packagings:

- 2 litre cartons and 1 litre bottles are sold in the following flavours: apple, orange, multivitamin, black currant, aronia-apple-cherry, with pink grapefruit, blood orange
- 1.75 litre PET bottles are available in: orange with red orange, green apple, red grape, and exotic flavours.

== See also ==
- Tymbark (company)
