= Bols (brand) =

Alcohol brand

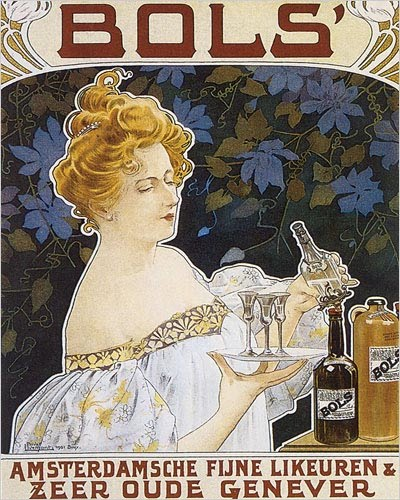
Poster by Henri Privat-Livemont (1901)

Bols is a brand name used by Lucas Bols, a Dutch distiller of alcoholic beverages. The brand line consists of vodkas, gins, genevers, advocaats and liqueurs. Bols has been extant since 1575, and claims to be the oldest distillery brand in the world. The brand is now distributed in 110 countries, and the liqueur line has over 30 different flavors. As the result of an earlier divestiture, in Eastern Europe the Bols brand is owned by Maspex.

It is Ray Charles's choice of drink in the movie Ray.

There are certain cocktails that use Bols:

- Indonesian "Bamblabana" (vodka, lime, ginger and hot pepper sauce),
- Norway "Dverg" (vodka, heavy cream, cherry juice),
- Greece "Bolz" (vodka, fig juice, pomegranate juice, bourbon, lemon)

== In popular culture ==
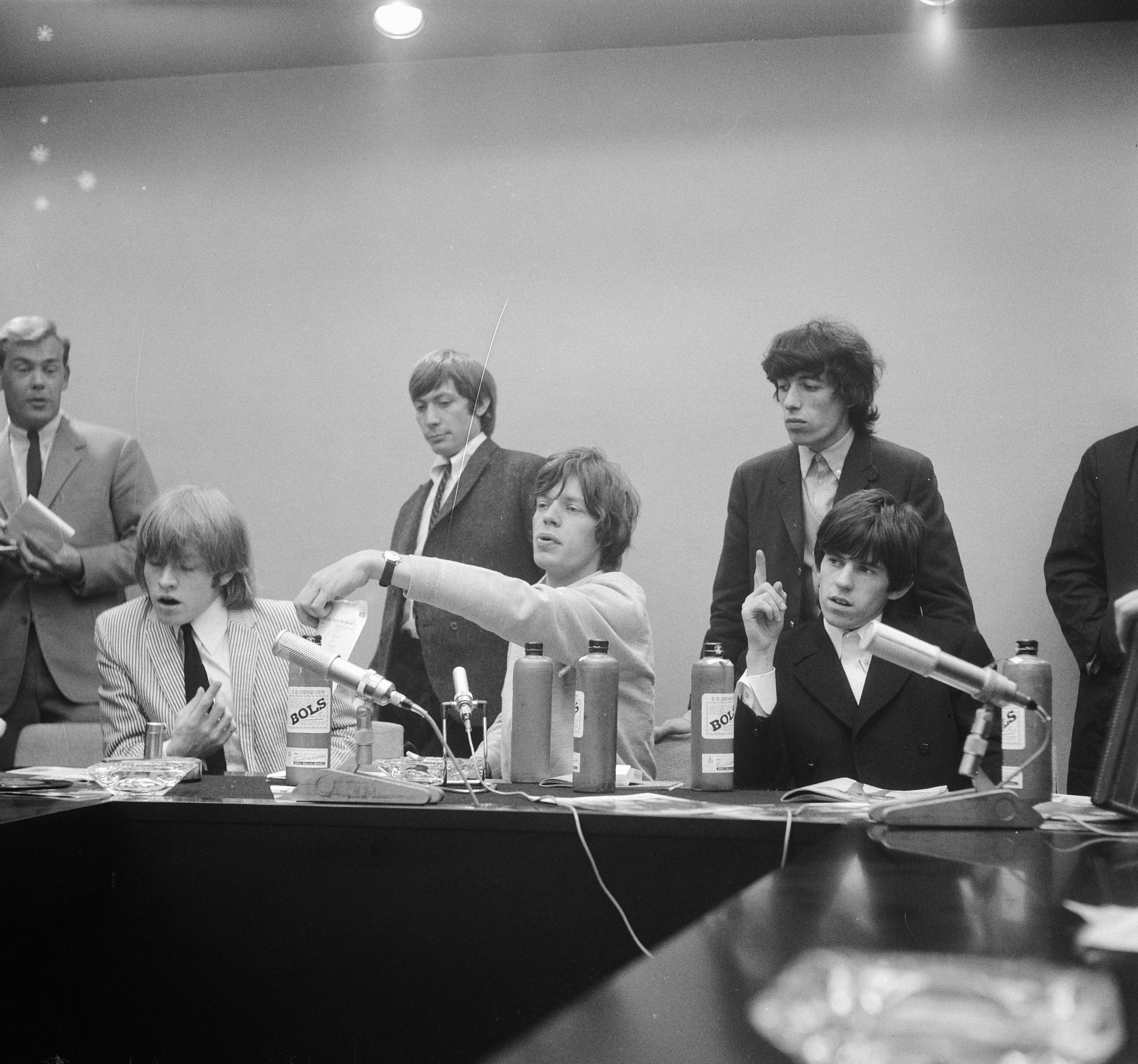
The Rolling Stones at a Schiphol airport interview, 1964

In the BBC sitcom 'Allo 'Allo!, series 1's third episode, "Savile Row to the Rescue", nitroglycerin, for the use by the French Resistance to blow up a railway line, is stored in a bottle of Bols gin in the cellar of Rene's café.
