= Eggnog =

Creamy dairy-based beverage

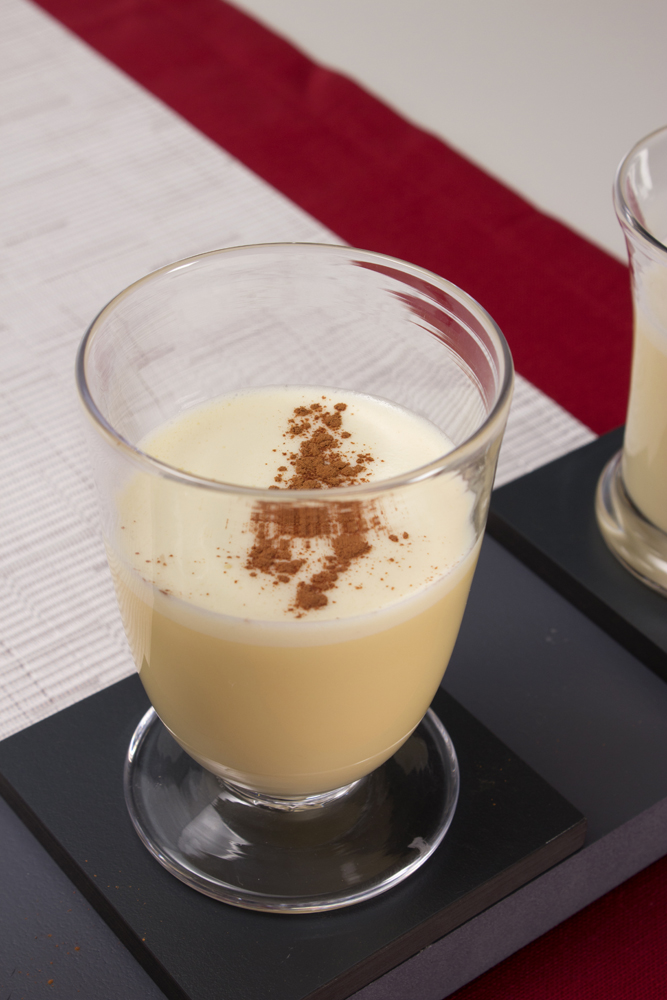
Eggnog with cinnamon

Eggnog (/ˈɛɡ.ˌnɒɡ/; or egg nog), historically also known (when alcoholic) as milk punch or egg milk punch, is a rich, chilled, sweetened, creamy dairy-based beverage traditionally made with milk or cream, sugar, whipped eggs (which gives it a frothy texture) and, in some contexts, distilled spirits such as brandy, rum or bourbon.

Eggnog is traditionally consumed throughout Canada and the United States at Christmas or during the holiday season every year, often from American Thanksgiving through the end of the Christmas or holiday season (which usually correlates with New Year’s Day in the U.S. and Canada). During this period, commercially prepared eggnog is sold in grocery stores in these countries. Eggnog is also often homemade. Distilled spirits are sometimes added to both commercially prepared eggnog and homemade eggnog. Eggnog or eggnog flavoring may also be used in other drinks, such as coffee (e.g. an "eggnog latte" espresso drink) and tea, or to dessert foods such as egg-custard puddings or eggnog-flavored ice cream.

== History ==
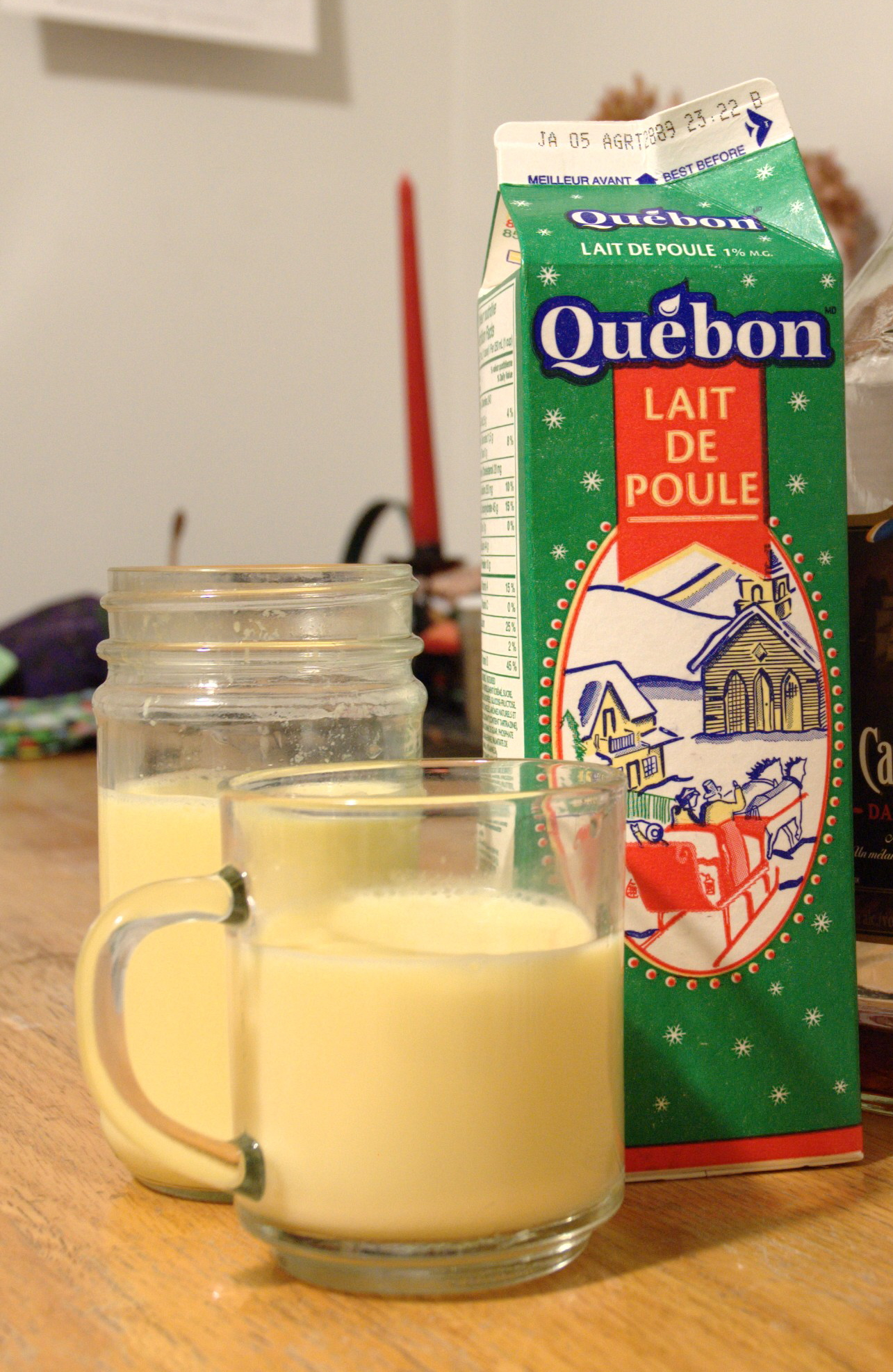
A carton and a glass of eggnog from Montreal, Canada, showing its French façade (English reverse) and the French term lait de poule (literally, "hen's milk")

=== Etymology and origins ===
The origins, etymology, and the ingredients used to make the original eggnog drink are debated. According to the Oxford English Dictionary, nog was "a kind of strong beer brewed in East Anglia". Alternatively, nog may stem from noggin, a Middle English term for a small, carved wooden mug used to serve alcohol. However, the British drink was also called an Egg Flip, from the practice of "flipping" (rapidly pouring) the mixture between two pitchers to mix it. One dictionary lists the word as being an Americanism invented in 1765-75. Babson College professor Frederick Douglass Opie "...wrote that the term is a combination of two colonial slang words — rum was referred to as grog and bartenders served it in small wooden mugs called noggins. The drink first became known as egg-n-grog and later as eggnog." Ben Zimmer, executive editor for vocabulary.com disputes the "egg-n-grog" theory as lacking proof; Zimmer states that the term "nog" may be related to the "...Scottish term nugg or nugged ale, meaning "ale warmed with a hot poker."

The first example of the term "eggnog" was in 1775, when American clergyman and philologist Jonathan Boucher wrote a poem about the drink which was not published until 30 years after his death: "Fog-drams i' th' morn, or (better still) egg-nogg, / At night hot-suppings, and at mid-day, grogg, / My palate can regale..." The first printed use of the term was in 1788 in the New-Jersey Journal of March 26, which referred to a young man drinking a glass of eggnog.

Eggnog may have developed from posset, a medieval European beverage made with hot milk that was curdled with wine or ale and flavoured with spices. In the Middle Ages, posset was used as a cold and flu remedy. Posset was popular from medieval times to the 19th century. Eggs were added to some posset recipes; according to TIME magazine, by the "...13th century, monks were known to drink a posset with eggs and figs."

=== Development ===
Eggnog "…seems to have been popular on both sides of the Atlantic at that time. In the American South, eggnog is made with bourbon. Eggnog is called coquito in Puerto Rico, where rum and fresh coconut juice or coconut milk are used in its preparation. Mexican eggnog, also known as rompope, was developed in Santa Clara. It differs from regular eggnog in its use of Mexican cinnamon and rum or grain alcohol. In Peru, eggnog is called biblia con pisco, and it is made with a Peruvian pomace brandy called pisco."

German eggnog, called "biersuppe", is made with beer. "Eierpunsch is a German version of eggnog made with white wine", eggs, sugar, cloves, tea, lemon or lime juice and cinnamon. Another recipe dating from 1904 calls for eggs, lemon juice, sugar, white wine, water and rum. In Iceland, eggnog "…is served hot as a dessert."

In Britain, the drink was popular mainly among the aristocracy. Milk, eggs, and sherry were foods of the wealthy, so eggnog was often used in toasts to prosperity and good health. Those who could get milk and eggs mixed it with brandy, Madeira or sherry to make a drink similar to modern alcoholic egg nog. The drink is described in the 1932 novel Cold Comfort Farm (chapter 21) as a Hell's Angel, made with an egg, two ounces of brandy, a teaspoonful of cream, and some chips of ice, where it is served as breakfast.

The drink crossed the Atlantic to the British colonies during the 18th century. Since brandy and wine were heavily taxed, rum from the Triangular Trade with the Caribbean was a cost-effective substitute. The inexpensive liquor, coupled with plentiful farm and dairy products, helped the drink become very popular in America. When the supply of rum to the newly founded United States was reduced as a consequence of the American Revolutionary War, Americans turned to domestic whiskey, and eventually bourbon in particular, as a substitute. Eggnog "became tied to the holidays" when it was adopted in the United States in the 1700s. Records show that the first US President, George Washington, "...served an eggnog-like drink to visitors" which included "...rye whiskey, rum, and sherry."

"Tom and Jerry is a form of hot eggnog [cocktail] that was once popular." The Tom and Jerry was invented by British journalist Pierce Egan in the 1820s, using brandy and rum added to eggnog and served hot, usually in a mug or a bowl. The drink features prominently in Damon Runyon's 1932 short story "Dancing Dan's Christmas". It is mentioned briefly in Yogi Yorgesson's 1949 novelty song "I Yust Go Nuts at Christmas" and characters drink Tom and Jerrys in the 1940 film Beyond Tomorrow and the 1941 film The Great Mr. Nobody. It is also mentioned in the 1960 film The Apartment.

Isaac Weld, Junior, in his book Travels Through the States of North America and the Provinces of Upper and Lower Canada, during the years 1795, 1796, and 1797 (published in 1800) wrote: "The American travellers, before they pursued their journey, took a hearty draught each, according to custom, of egg-nog, a mixture composed of new milk, eggs, rum, and sugar, beat up together; …"

== Ingredients ==
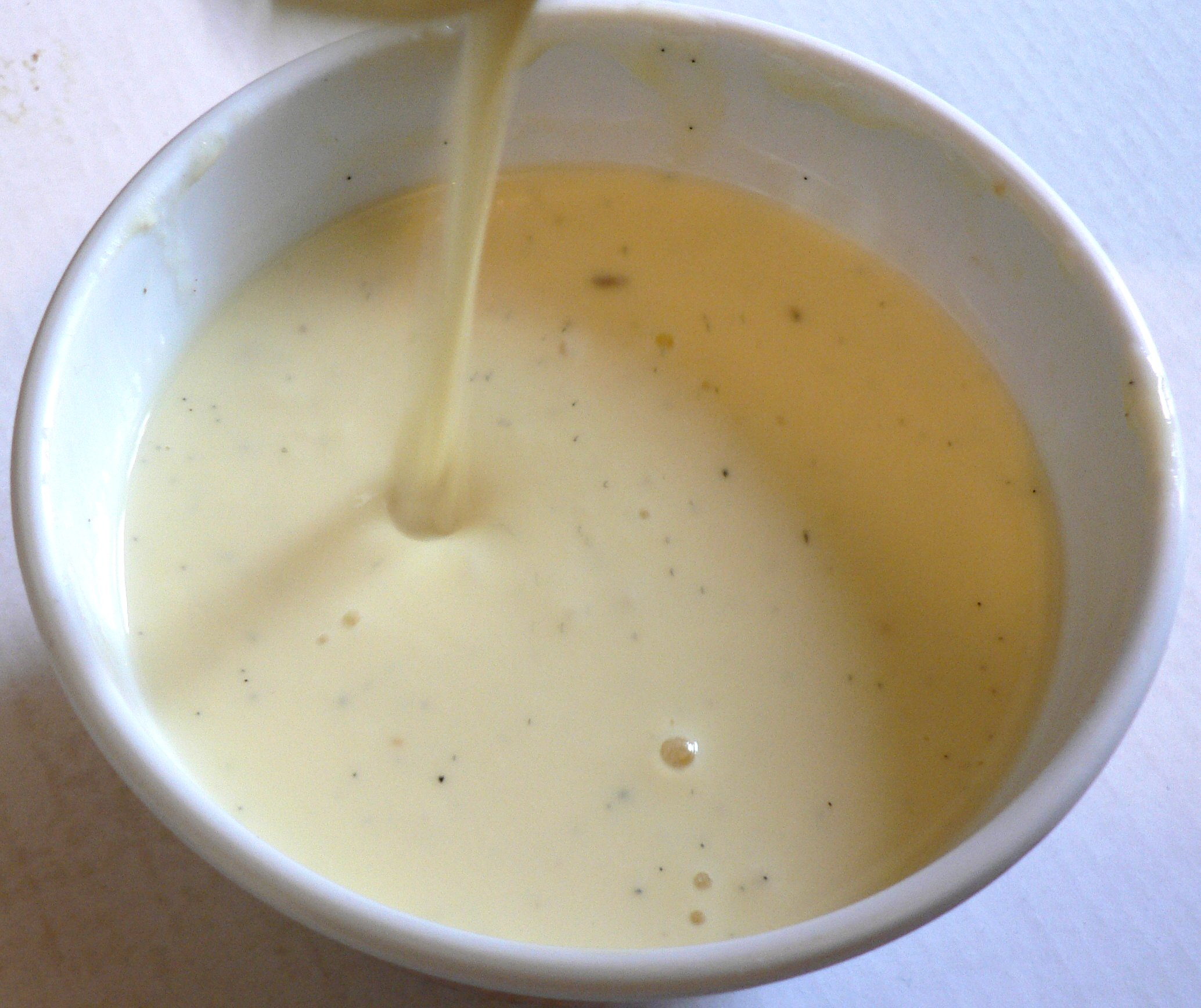
Traditional eggnog typically consists of milk, sugar and raw eggs.

Traditional eggnog is made of milk or cream, sugar, raw eggs, an alcoholic spirit, and spices, often vanilla or nutmeg. Some modern commercial eggnogs add gelatin and other thickeners, with less egg and cream. Ingredients vary, and toppings may be added, such as grated nutmeg or ground cinnamon. Eggnog can be made commercially or at home. Ready-made eggnog versions are seasonally available with different spirits, or without alcohol, to be drunk as bought or used as "mixes" with all the ingredients except the liquor, to be added as desired. Traditional eggnog has a significant fat content, due to the use of cream, and a high sugar content; low-fat and sugar-free formulations are available using skimmed or low-fat milk.

Dutch advocaat with around 20% alcohol, long sold in bottles, is essentially an eggnog. Under current U.S. law, commercial products sold as eggnog are permitted to contain milk, sugar, modified milk ingredients, glucose-fructose, water, carrageenan, guar gum, natural and artificial flavorings, spices, monoglycerides, and colorings. Ingredients vary significantly between variants. Alcohol used in different national and regional versions of eggnog includes brandy, cognac, bourbon, whiskey, sherry, rum and grain alcohol.

== Non-dairy eggnogs ==
Some North American manufacturers offer soy-, almond-, rice- or coconut milk-based alternatives for vegans and those with dairy allergies, lactose intolerance or other dietary restrictions.

The history of non-dairy eggnogs goes back to at least 1899 when Almeda Lambert, in her Guide for Nut Cookery, gave a recipe for "Egg Nog" made using coconut cream, eggs, and sugar. In 1973, Eunice Farmilant, in The Natural Foods Sweet-Tooth Cookbook, gave a more modern non-dairy eggnog recipe using 3 eggs separated, 2 tablespoons of barley malt extract or Amasake syrup, 4 cups of chilled soy milk, 1 teaspoon of vanilla extract, and nutmeg (p. 138-39)

In 1981, Grain Country of Los Angeles, California, introduced Grain Nog, the first non-dairy, vegan eggnog. Based on amazake (a traditional Japanese fermented rice beverage) and containing no eggs, it was available in plain, strawberry, and carob flavors. In 1981, Redwood Valley Soyfoods Unlimited (California) also introduced "Soynog", the earliest known soy-based non-dairy and vegan eggnog, made with soy milk and tofu (added for thickness). It was renamed Lite Nog in 1982 and Tofu Nog in 1985.

== Health and safety ==
=== Raw eggs ===
Most homemade eggnog recipes have historically included raw eggs. While the alcohol added to many homemade eggnogs is a bactericide, eggnog made from raw eggs infected with salmonella and not heated can cause food poisoning. In 1982, most of the residents and staff of a nursing home in the U.S. became ill with salmonellosis, and four died. The cause was almost certainly an eggnog made on the spur of the moment, with some cases caused in a secondary outbreak caused by food being handled later by people with contaminated hands. A later publication of the U.S. Food and Drug Administration (FDA) stated that the alcohol in eggnog is not sufficient to sterilize contaminated eggs. Using commercial pasteurized eggs or heating the milk-egg mixture sufficiently can make the drink safe; one recipe calls for heating the mixture gently, without boiling, until it thickens enough to "coat the back of a spoon."

However, aged alcoholic eggnog becomes sterilized even if made with contaminated eggs. Aging alcoholic eggnog—sometimes for as long as a year—has been said to significantly improve its flavor and destroy pathogens. The Rockefeller University Laboratory of Bacterial Pathogenesis and Immunology carried out an experiment in 2010 in which salmonella was added to a strong eggnog that was refrigerated and stored; the beverage still had dangerous levels of salmonella a week later, but it was gone within three weeks. A concentration of at least 20% of alcohol (about the same amounts of alcoholic spirits and milk or cream), and refrigeration are recommended for safety.

For concerns about the safety of selling products made from raw eggs and milk, the U.S. FDA has changed the definition of eggnog several times to allow artificial replacements for the large number of eggs traditionally used. FDA regulations (as of January 2015) require eggnog to contain at least 1% egg yolk solids and at least 8.25% milk solids. Some recipes for homemade eggnog call for egg yolks to be cooked with milk into a custard to avoid potential hazards from raw eggs.

=== Alcohol content ===
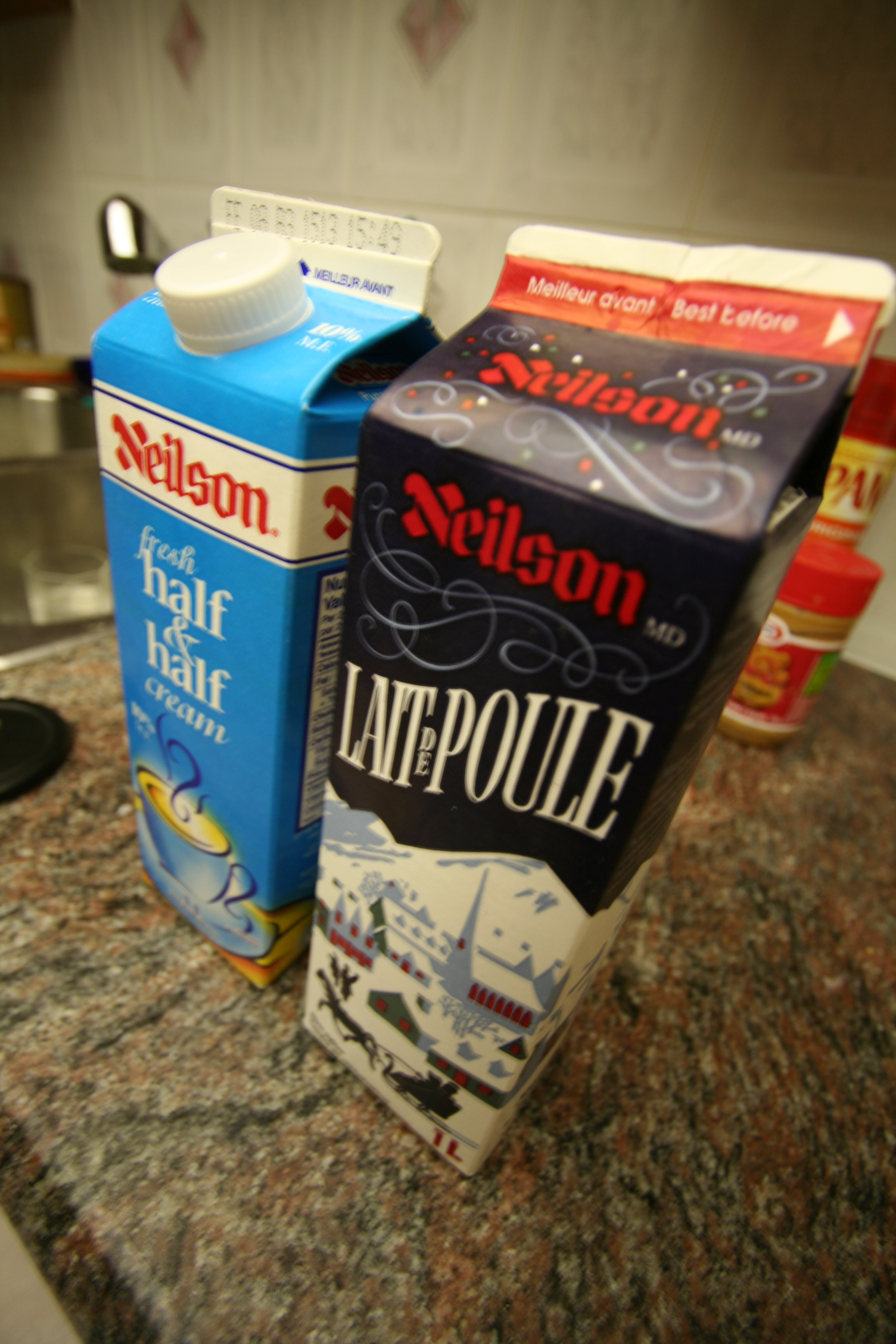
Neilson, a Canadian brand of prepared eggnog, labelled using the French term for the drink "Lait de poule" (literally "Hen's milk").

TIME magazine states that individuals should be aware of the alcohol content of eggnog from a responsible-drinking perspective. CNN states that some 19th-century American eggnog recipes called for significant amounts of alcohol; one recipe "calls for three dozen eggs, half a gallon of domestic brandy, and another half-pint of French brandy." The high alcohol content of "...colonial eggnog inevitably led to problems. In 19th-century Baltimore, it was customary for young men to go from house to house on New Year’s Day, toasting their hosts with eggnog along the way. The challenge: to finish one’s rounds still standing."

The most notable case of alcohol problems associated with the drink was the Eggnog Riot at the United States Military Academy in West Point, New York, on 23–25 December 1826. Alcohol possession at the academy was prohibited, along with drunkenness and intoxication, both of which could lead to expulsion. By 1826, concern had been raised that drinking was starting to get out of hand among the 260 cadets at the academy. The cadets were informed that, due to the alcohol prohibition on the site, their Christmas eggnog would be alcohol-free, prompting the decision by cadets to smuggle liquor into the academy. Gallons of whiskey were smuggled into the barracks to make eggnog for a Christmas Day party. This led to "...a drunken free-for-all. Windows, furniture, and crockery were smashed; banisters were torn from walls, and fights broke out. One eggnog-addled cadet tried, but failed, to shoot his commanding officer." The incident resulted in the court-martialing of twenty cadets and one enlisted soldier. The young Jefferson Davis, who was in attendance, was not found guilty of any offenses or expelled despite his role in the organization of the alcoholic party.

== See also ==
- Advocaat
- Boiled custard
- Cola de mono
- Coquito
- Eierpunsch
- Kogel mogel
- Lassi
- Milk punch
- Mulled wine
- Ponche crema
- Rompope
- Soda sữa hột gà
- Tamagozake
- Tom and Jerry (cocktail)
- Zabaione
