= Rompope =

Eggnog drink from Latin America

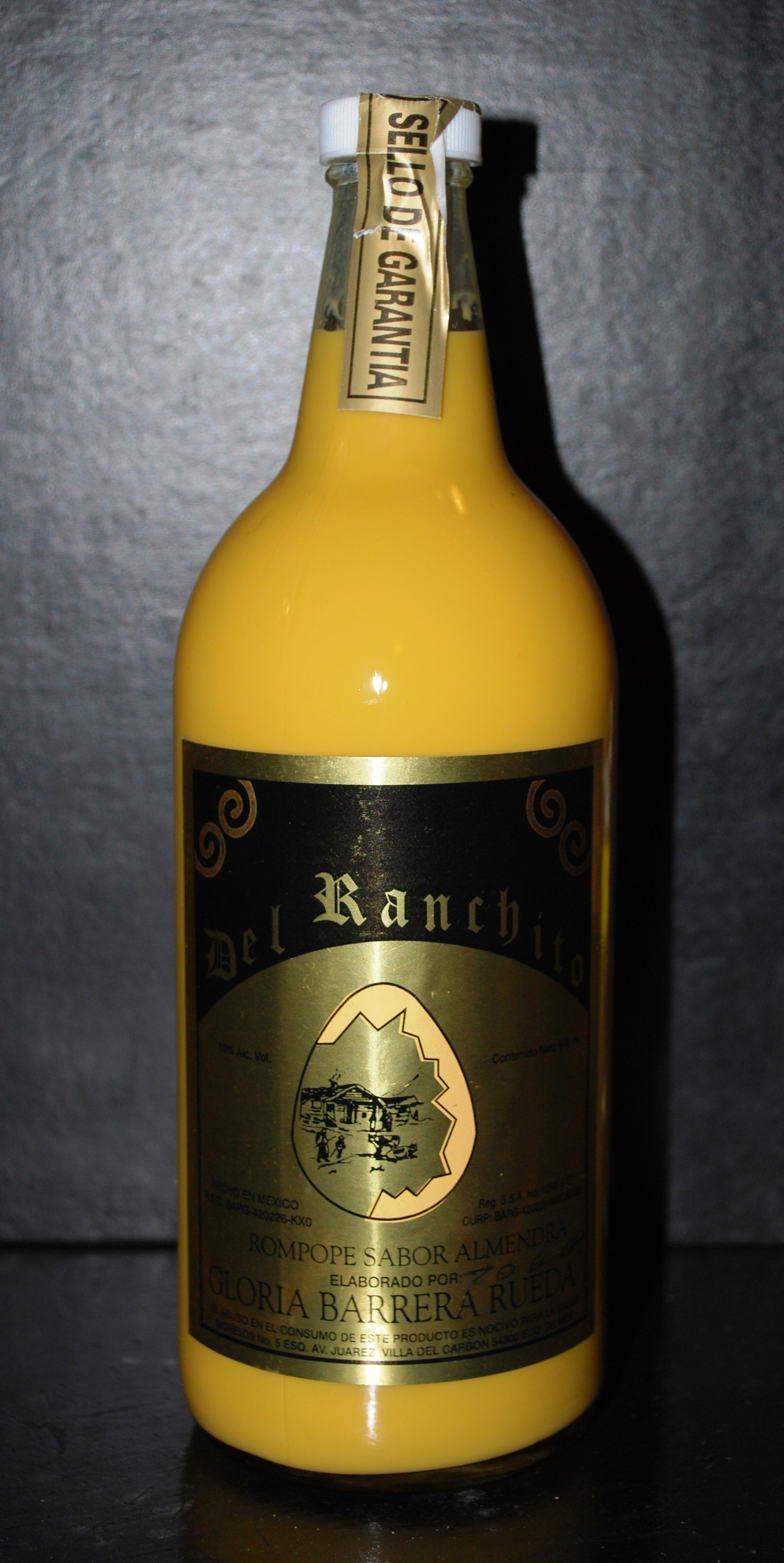
Commercially prepared rompope

Rompope, also known as rompopo, rumpopo, or rum popo, is an eggnog drink made with eggs, milk, vanilla flavouring, and rum. The egg yolks impart a yellow hue to the emulsified beverage. It is a traditional drink enjoyed throughout Central America, Mexico, and Ecuador, most commonly around Christmastime. In Mexico, it is believed to have been originally made in the convents of the city of Puebla, Mexico. The word rompope is a derivation of the word rompon, which is used to describe the Spanish version of eggnog that came to Mexico. The Spanish version utilizes rum as its main ingredient, hence the root of both rom-pon and rom-pope. For example, Salcaja, in Guatemala, offers one known version of this rompope drink and in South America, the country of Chile has among its most popular drinks rompon and cola de mono or monkey's tail, the latter containing coffee, making it dark instead of yellow, but also containing the other ingredients commonly found in rompope.

== History ==
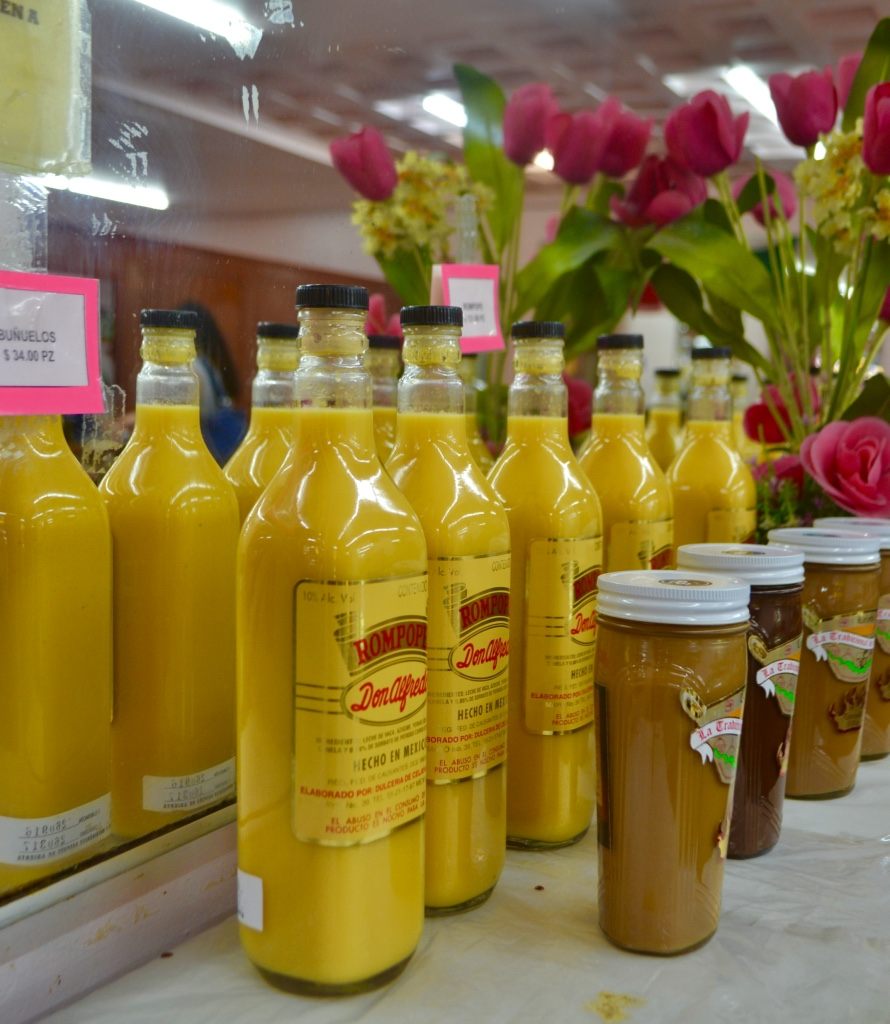
Bottles of rompope and cajeta for sale at the Dulcería de Celaya shop of the Colonia Roma in Mexico City

Rompope is one of many versions of the varied combinations of eggs, milk, sugar, and alcoholic spirits that are traditionally used for many celebrations mainly in Mexico and the Americas. Dutch advocaat is one known as well as the English eggnog, a descendant of the milk and sherry mix called "posset", and American eggnog, made with either rum or bourbon, are also similar to rompope. There are different close relatives of rompope in several countries (where local spirited drinks are incorporated into the mix), but in Mexico, rompope became a widely known and popular beverage. Mexican rompope remains mainstream among the locals, and there are several popular commercial brands of this drink widely available in international markets.

Mexican rompope is typical of recipes that came out of the convents during the Colonial period, particularly from Puebla de Los Angeles. According to tradition, the original Mexican rompope beverage was created in Puebla's Convento de Santa Clara in the 17th century.

== Availability ==
Rompope is made commercially throughout Mexico, all year long. Although trade brands are mainstream, many locals prefer to make it at home. Several ingredients are sometimes added to the drink, including pecans, almonds, walnuts, cinnamon, pine nuts, vanilla, strawberry and other local ingredients. Besides the holidays, locals drink rompope on family celebrations, and in addition to being a beverage, rompope is included in desserts, or used as a topping. Commercial rompope is available in the United States, particularly in the states bordering Mexico, and in some other countries in addition to other beverages that are similar.

== See also ==
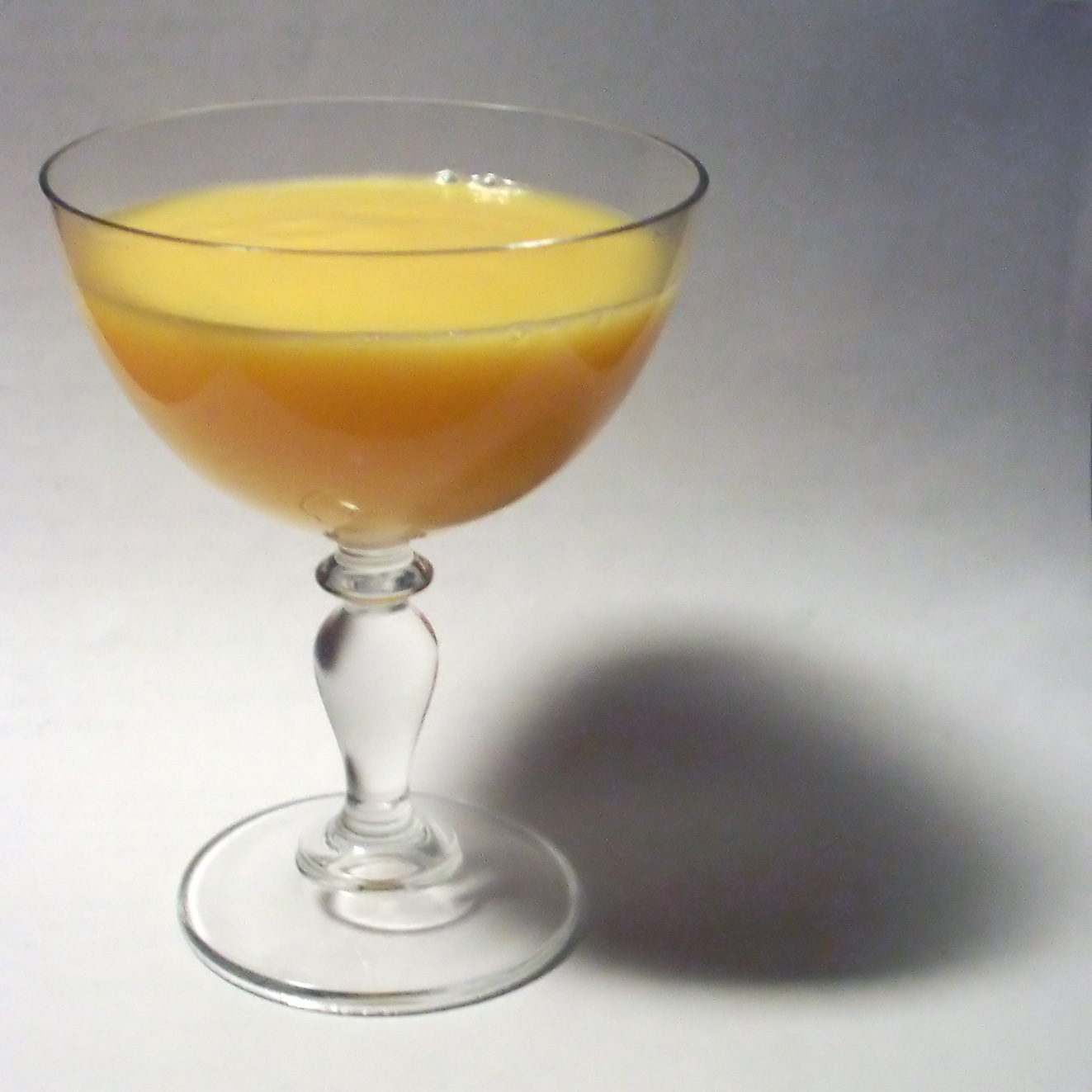
Rompope

- Advocaat – Dutch alcoholic beverage featuring eggs
- Cola de mono – Chilean cocktail
- Coquito – Puerto Rican rum and coconut milk cocktail
- Eggnog – Sweetened dairy-based beverage
- Eierpunsch – Warm, sweetened alcoholic, egg-based drink
- Kogel mogel – Egg-based homemade dessert
- Ponche crema – Cream liqueur from Venezuela and Trinidad and Tobago
- Puebla cuisine
- Zabaione, also known as Zabaglione – Italian dessert, or sometimes drink
