= Ponche Navideño =

Mexican Christmas punch

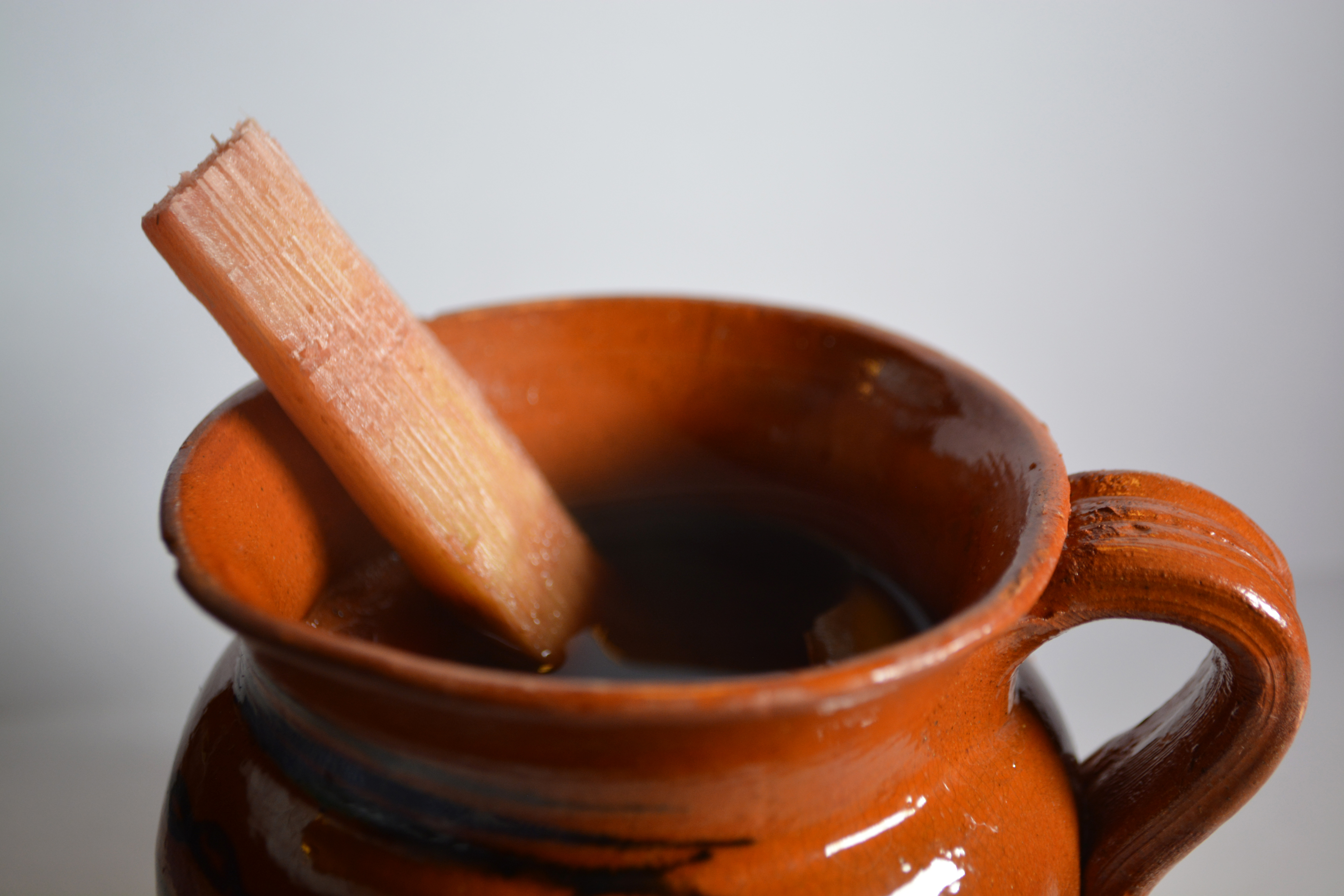
- Type: Punch
- Course: Drink
- Serving temperature: Warm or hot
- Main ingredients: Tejocotes, pilloncillo, cinnamon, seasonal fruits

Ponche Navideño is a Mexican Christmas punch that is customarily served during Christmastime and Las Posadas in Mexico and other Latin American countries.

== Origin ==
According to Kenya Dworkin, professor of Hispanic studies at Carnegie Mellon University, Ponche Navideño originated in India.

== Ingredients, preparation, and serving ==
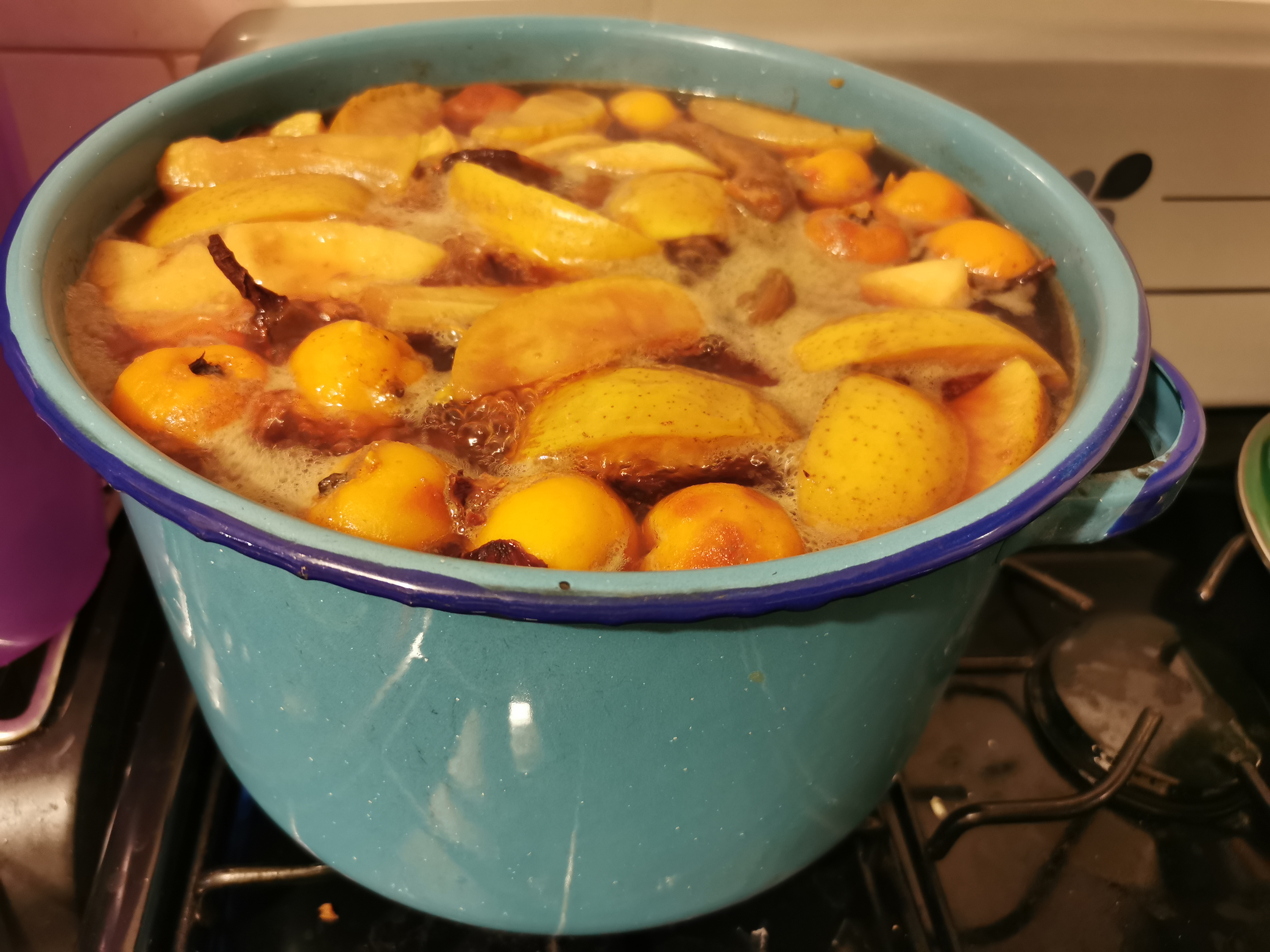
Being prepared

The traditional ingredients are tejocotes, pilloncillo (raw sugar cane), and cinnamon. The fruits of guava, tamarind, raisins, prunes, and oranges are common additions. Ponche Navideño is served hot or warm, and may be garnished with a stick of sugar cane. When a shot of alcohol (popularly rum) is added to the punch, it is called ponche con piqueto ("punch with a sting").

== See also ==
- Cola de mono
- Colada morada
- Ponche de frutas navideno
