= Verpoorten =

Producer of advocaat

VERPOORTEN GmbH & Co. KG
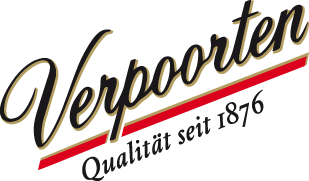
- Company type: GmbH & Co. KG
- Industry: Drinks
- Founded: 1876
- Headquarters: Bonn
- Key people: William Verpoorten
- Revenue: ca. 50 Million Euro
- Number of employees: ca. 100
- Website: eieiei.verpoorten.de

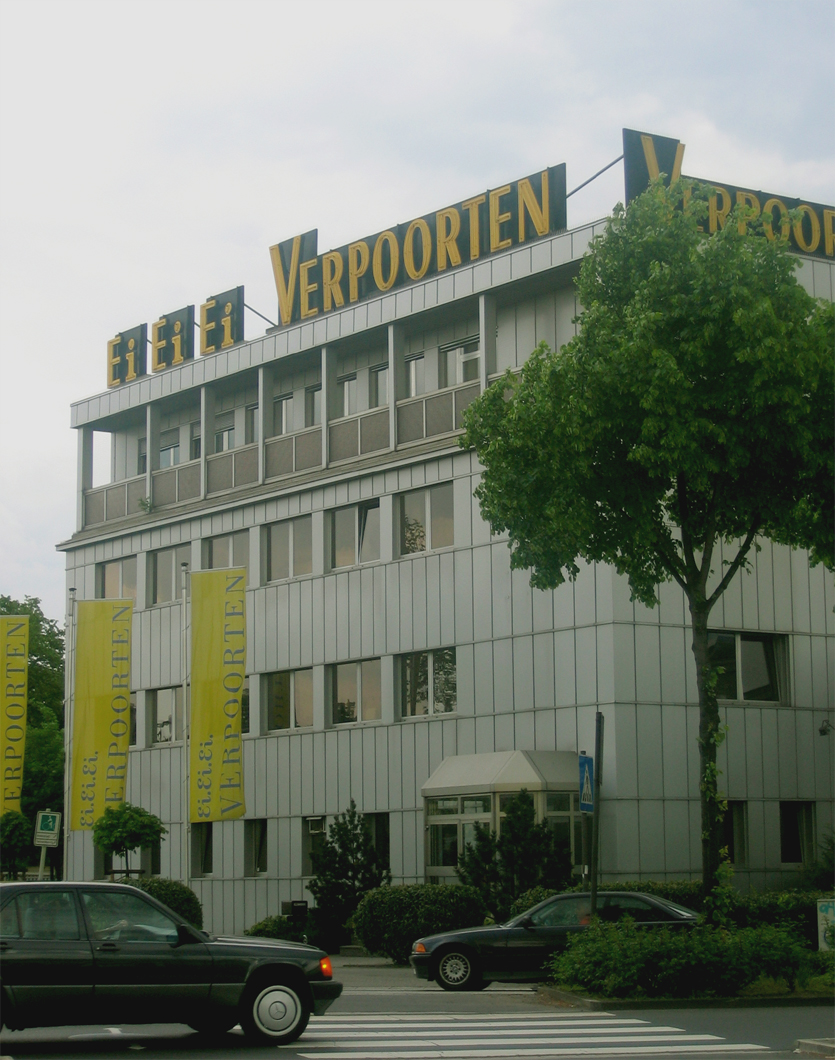
VERPOORTEN in Bonn

Verpoorten GmbH & Co. KG is a producer of advocaat (egg liqueur).

Eugen Verpoorten founded the company in 1876 in Heinsberg, Germany. The distiller from Antwerp opened the "Liquor Factory & Colonial Goods of H. Verpoorten" on Heinsberg's High Street, next to the noblewomen's collegiate foundation. The strictly guarded recipe for the egg liquor has remained unchanged since the company was founded.

His son Hubert Verpoorten continued the business successfully, and William Verpoorten, born in 1890, then headed the operation in the third generation. In 1920, he relocated the site to Berlin because he saw no promising prospects of a new start in the French-occupied Rhineland after his return from the First World War. The building was later destroyed by a direct hit during the Second World War in 1944.

Once production had been resumed after the Second World War, initially at an existing branch in Straubing, construction of today’s headquarters in Bonn commenced in 1952. Viktor Verpoorten was now head of the business and placed an enormous focus on advertising for the first time in the 1960s, when he created the slogan "Ei, ei, ei [egg, egg, egg] – Verpoorten" derived from the popular hit "Ay ay ay Maria – Maria aus Bahia" in 1961. The previous advertising message had run: "revitalises the palate, refreshes and strengthens, gladdens and cheers, at home and in all places: Verpoorten". In 1960, a 1-litre bottle cost 9.25 German Marks retail. For comparison in 2007: approx. 15 euros.

Verpoorten has been family-owned for five generations. Today's managing director is William Verpoorten.

Verpoorten employs a staff of around 100 and up to 130,000 bottles are filled and exported to 30 countries every day. According to information from the company, sales are stable at around 50 million euros.

== Sources ==
- Aachener Zeitung v. 24. Dezember 2003
- verpoorten.de
