= Milk punch =

Milk based brandy or bourbon beverage

Milk Punch
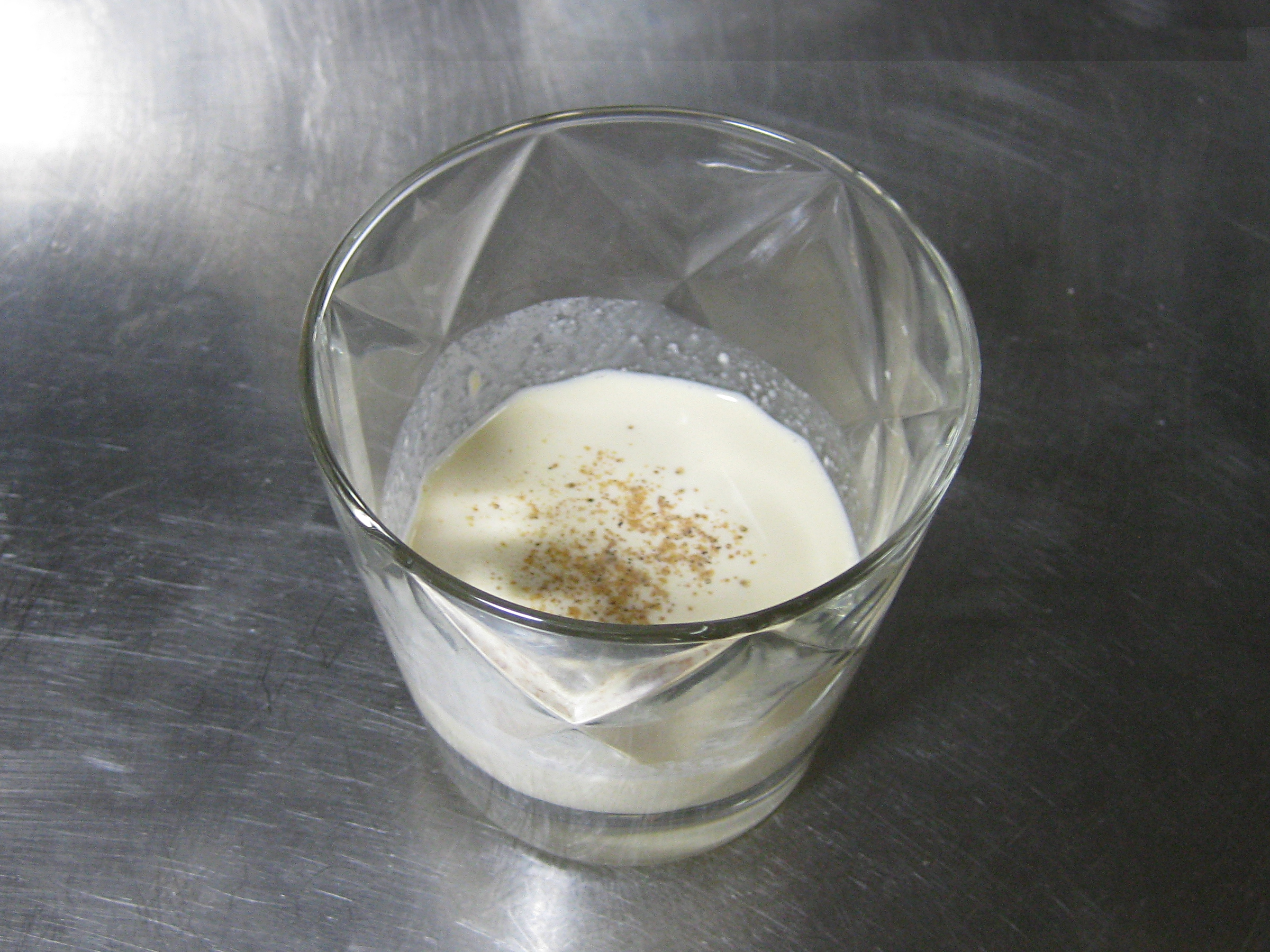
- Egg milk punch, or eggnog
- Ingredients: Brandy, whiskey, or bourbon
- Standard drinkware: Collins glass
- Standard garnish: Nutmeg
- Served: Cold
- Preparation: Combine liquor and sugar with ice. Shake well. Strain and ice and milk.

Milk punch is a milk-based brandy or bourbon beverage. It consists of milk, the spirit, sugar, and vanilla extract. It is served cold and usually has nutmeg sprinkled on top. Milk punch may be clarified through the addition of ingredients which cause the milk to curdle, so that the solids contributing to the beverage's opacity may be strained out.

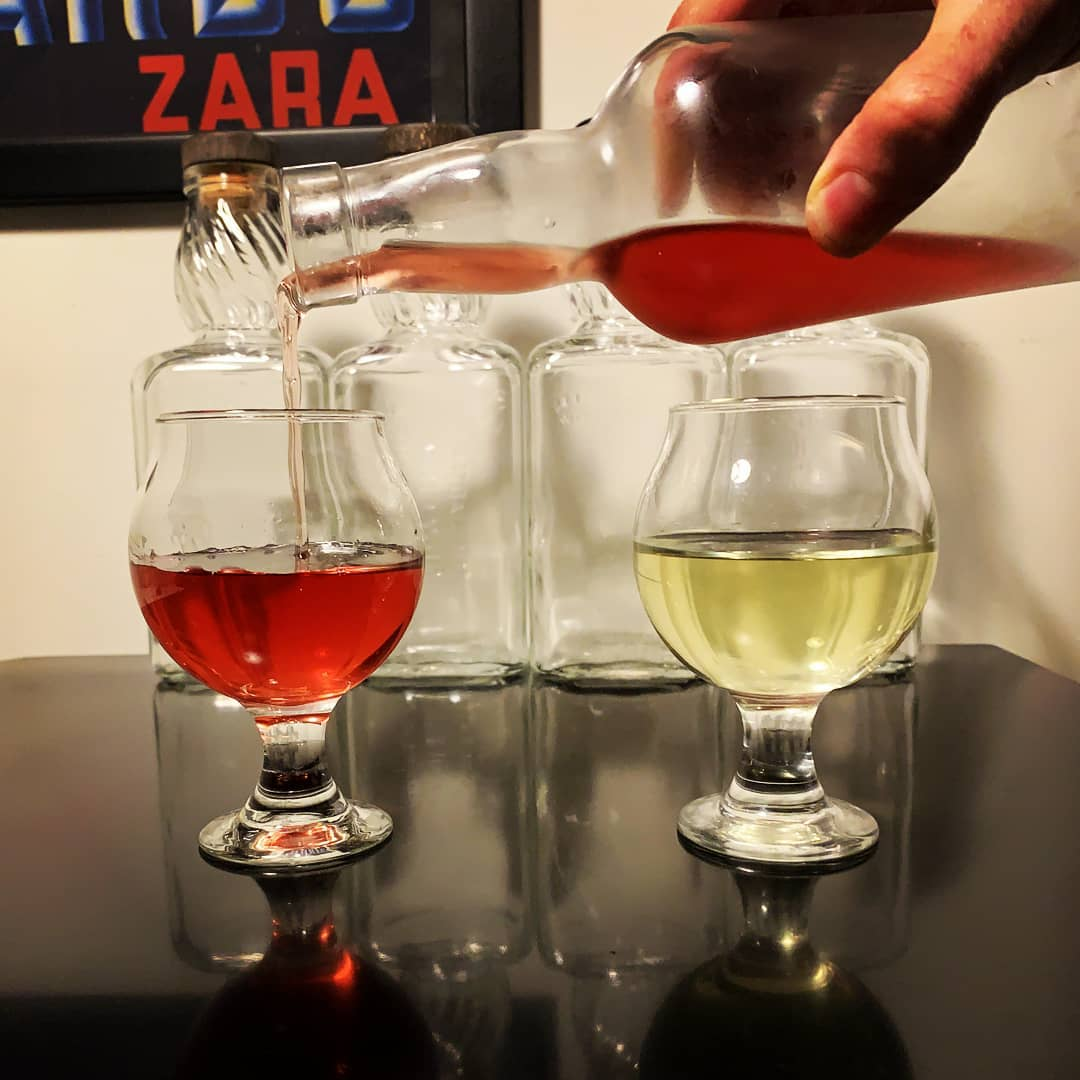
Two clarified milk punches served in tasting glasses. The one on the left is made from Batavia arrack, ruby port, black tea, lemon juice, milk, and sugar; the one on the right is made from brandy infused with orange and lemon peels, orange and lemon juices, milk, and sugar. Rather than the traditional use of bovine milk, oat milk was used in both beverages so that they would be suitable for consumption by vegans.

== History ==
The drink was first recorded in William Sacheverell's 1688 travelogue of the Scottish isle of Iona. Later accounts attributed its spread, if not its origin, to Aphra Behn. The earliest recorded recipe for milk punch dates to a 1711 cookbook.

Originally served in a punch bowl, early recipes resembled posset and syllabub in the use of curdled, strained cream, leaving only lactic acid. This technique aimed at food stability, a quality that made it popular as a bottled drink. Curdling could be accomplished through the addition of alcohol or acid, by heating, or both, such as in a recipe recorded by Benjamin Franklin in 1763 that used brandy and lemon added to hot milk.

The beverage reached the height of its popularity in the middle of the 18th century. Because of its shelf stability, it was popular as a bottled drink. Queen Victoria issued a royal warrant in 1838 to the company of Nathaniel Whisson as "purveyors of milk punch to Her Majesty".

Milk punch is drunk by Mr Pickwick, Mr Bob Sawyer and Mr Benjamin Allen in Chapter 50 of The Pickwick Papers, while on their way to Tewkesbury.

== Modern usage ==
Modern versions are often served in a glass and made with fresh milk or cream.

It is common in New Orleans and traditional at Christmastime throughout the Deep South.

Eggnog is a variation of milk punch, sometimes called egg milk punch.
