= Bombardino =

Italian hot cocktail

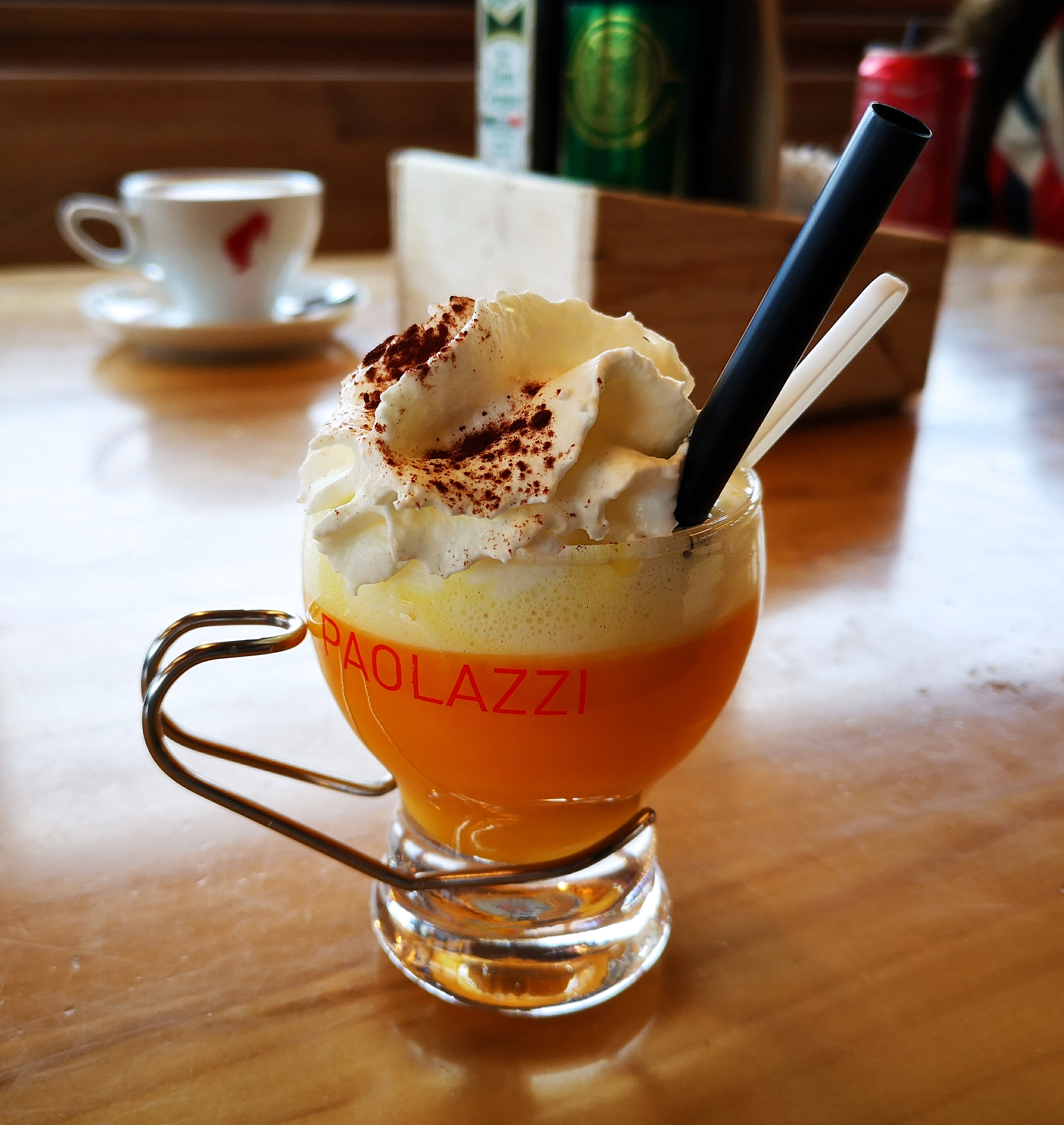
- Origin: Italy
- Ingredients: 1 part Brandy; 1 part Advocaat (or eggnog)
- Standard drinkware: Irish coffee mug

Bombardino is a drink popular in Italy during the winter, especially in ski resorts. It is made by mixing 1/2 Advocaat or eggnog and 1/2 Brandy.

More commonly, bombardino is obtained by mixing 3/4 of hot traditional Italian egg liquor (for example Vov or Zabov) and 1/4 rum or brandy.

"Vov" egg liqueur was created in Padua, Italy, in 1845 by a pastry chef, Gian Battista Pezziol, mixing egg yolks (leftover from the production of nougat) with marsala wine and alcohol.

Bombardino is served hot and with whipped cream on top on request. It has several variations: with coffee (calimero), with rum (pirata or pirate) or whiskey (scozzese or Scottish). The calimero variation is one part Brandy, one part Vov, and one part espresso.

== History ==
One legend says that the Bombardino was created by a Genovese man who moved to Livigno in the Italian Alps, and who eventually ran the Mottolino hut. When four men came in from a blizzard, the Genovese man served the men this drink. The Bombardino's name was then supposedly derived from one of these first imbibers noting its hot temperature and high alcohol and remarking (in Italian) "It's like a little bomb!".

The bombardino may also have been created in 1972 by Aldo Del Bò, the ski lift manager in Livigno, who is sometimes also named as the creator in the legend where one of the first drinkers compared the Bombardino to a little bomb.

== See also ==
- List of egg drinks
- Zabaione
