= Cola de mono =

Chilean cocktail

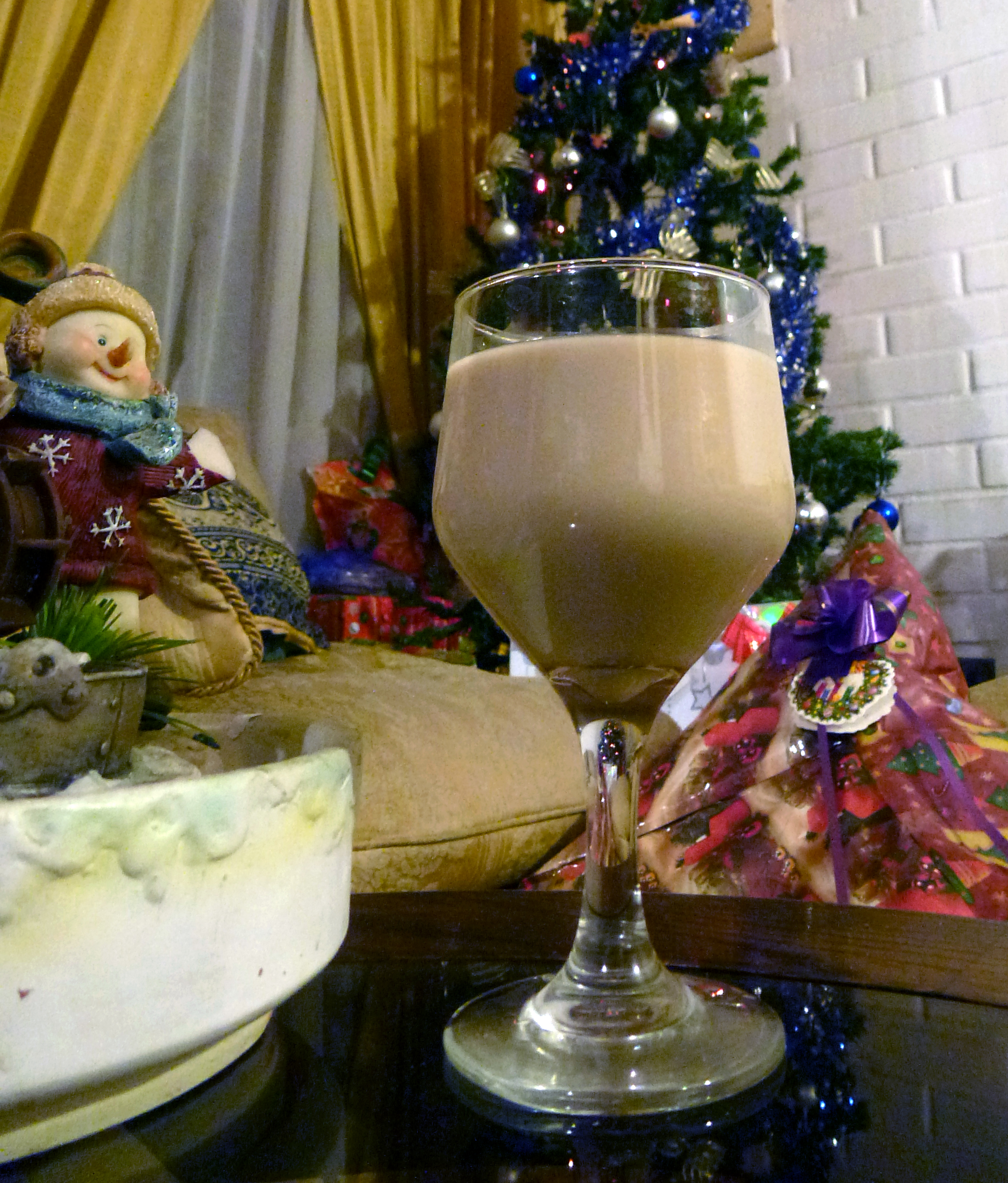
A glass of cola de mono on Christmas Eve

Cola de mono or colemono is a cocktail from Chilean cuisine, made with aguardiente, milk, coffee, sugar, and spices (optionally: cinnamon, clove, vanilla, and orange zest). It is widely consumed during Christmas and New Year celebrations, often paired with pan de Pascua (Christmas fruitcake).

== Etymology and history ==
Several theories exist about the origin of its name: One theory references the bottles in which the drink was initially sold. These were bottles of Anís del Mono, imported from Spain and popular in the Americas, whose label featured a monkey with a long tail.

Another theory points to the political use of the word "cola" (tail), which refers to a candidate who loses an election. After the 1901 Chilean presidential election, when Pedro Montt was defeated by Germán Riesco, Riesco's supporters reportedly celebrated his victory and "Montt's tail" at an ice cream parlor on San Pablo Street. The owner supposedly served his specialty: adding aguardiente to melted coffee-flavored ice cream. The drink, initially dubbed "cola de Montt," allegedly morphed into "cola de mono."

A third theory involves President Pedro Montt (1906–1910), nicknamed El Mono Montt by his inner circle. According to historian Belarmino Torres Vergara, during a gathering at the home of Filomena Cortés and her four daughters, Montt asked for his Colt revolver as he prepared to leave. Torrential rain prompted the hosts to feign losing the revolver to keep him longer. After running out of wine and spirits, they mixed aguardiente, sugar, and a jug of coffee with milk. The successful concoction was named "Colt de Montt" (referencing the revolver), later corrupted into "col'e mon," "colemono," and finally "cola de mono."

In the Diccionario de chilenismos y otras voces y locuciones viciosas (1901), Manuel Antonio Román states: "Cola de mono is what the people here call, undoubtedly due to its color, a drink composed of aguardiente, coffee, and milk." In Apuntes para la historia de la cocina chilena (1943), historian Eugenio Pereira Salas notes: "Juana Flores, the creator of 'cola de mono,' a variation of traditional milk punches with a mischievous twist, enriched with fragrant coffee essence and vanilla, died [...] in her beloved neighborhood of Plaza Almagro, in her cozy and charming home [...]." In Folklore lingüístico chileno (1981), folklorist Oreste Plath claims it was invented by Juana Flores' husband, Fermín Riquelme Carmona, who disliked the name "cola de mono" and preferred "colemono," as he had originally named it.

== Preparation ==
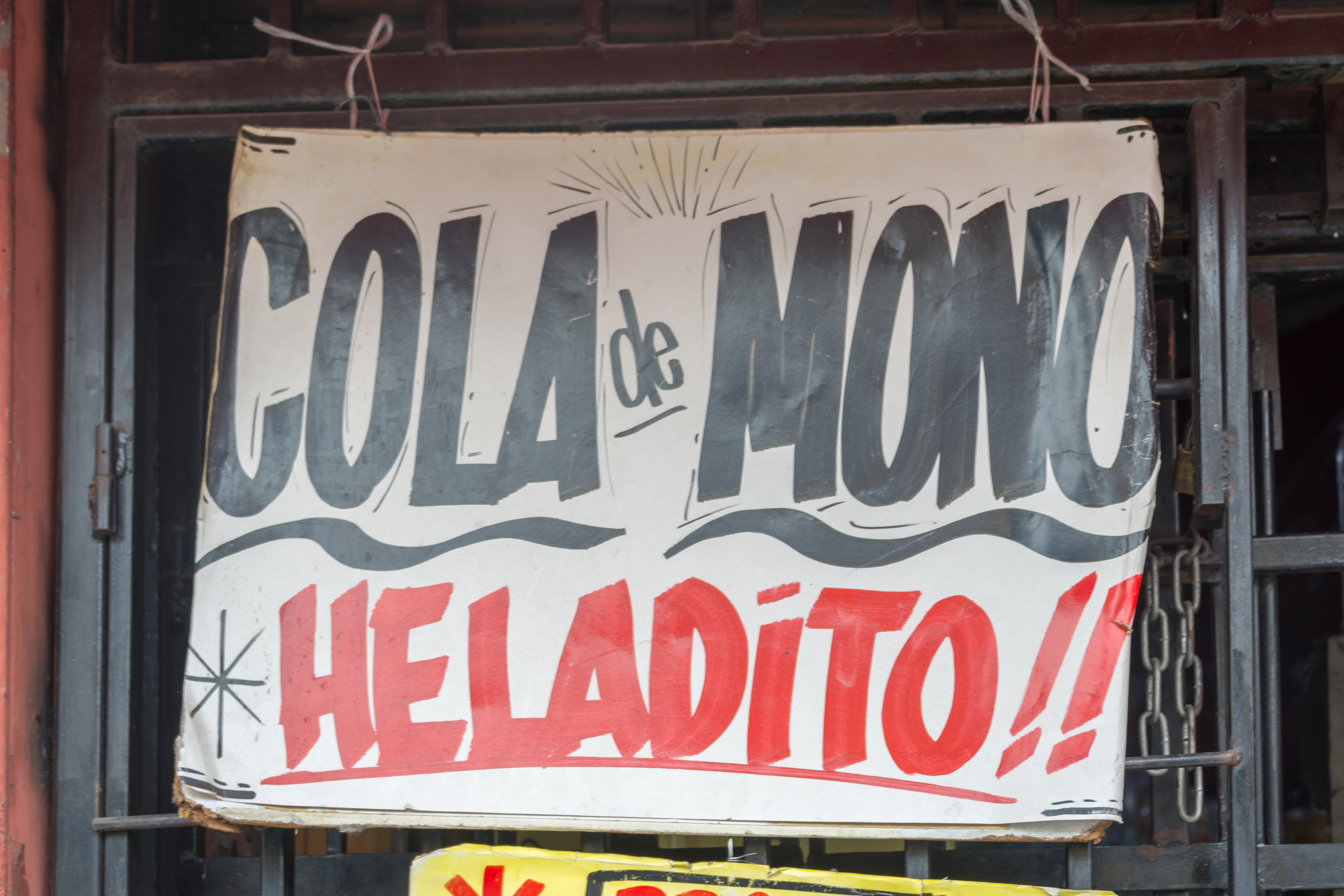
Cola de mono for sale in Santiago, Chile

Boil 2 L of milk. Dissolve 5 teaspoons of coffee and 400 g of sugar in half a cup of hot water. Once the milk boils, reduce heat and add the coffee-sugar mixture along with spices (1/3 grated nutmeg, 10 cloves, and 2 crushed cinnamon sticks). Simmer for 10 minutes, stirring constantly. Let cool, then strain. Finally, add 4 teaspoons of vanilla extract and 250 mL of aguardiente (or pisco to taste). Bottle and refrigerate.

A thicker version substitutes sugar with condensed milk or dulce de leche.

== In popular culture ==
In the album Bajo Belgrano (1983) by Argentine jazz rock band Spinetta Jade, the ninth track is "Cola de mono," composed by Luis Alberto Spinetta. Inspired by the cocktail, this fast-paced twist-rhythm song carries what Spinetta described as a "dolmenic [and] phallic" significance: "part of my virility is embedded in this terminology."

The Chilean fiction film Cola de mono (2018)—winner of the Audience Award at SANFIC14— produced and directed by Alberto Fuguet and starring Santiago Rodríguez Costabal, Cristóbal Rodríguez Costabal, and Carmina Riego, is set in Santiago on Christmas Eve 1986 and references the holiday punch.

In December 2023, the culinary website TasteAtlas named cola de mono the world's best cocktail.

== See also ==
- Eggnog – Sweetened dairy-based beverage
- Rompope – Eggnog drink from Latin America
- Irish cream – Cream liqueur
