= Ponche crema =

Cream liqueur from Venezuela and Trinidad and Tobago

Ponche crema is a cream-based liqueur originating in Venezuela and brought to nearby Trinidad and Tobago, which has developed its own version, Ponche de Crème. Recipes vary depending on the region, but main ingredients typically include milk, eggs, sugar, rum, and other minor ingredients such as vanilla, nutmeg, cinnamon, and lemon rind. A variant type is prepared with concentrated liquid coffee or instant coffee powder. However, most references to the ponche crema name aim at a traditional commercial product created by chemist and perfumist, Eliodoro González P. from Caracas, Venezuela, in 1900, and whose recipe and manufacturing process are kept secret. Ponche crema is a beverage traditionally served during Christmas time, much as eggnog is in the United States. It is usually served cold, in small cups, either as an aperitif or a pousse-café.

== See also ==
- Advocaat
- Baileys Irish Cream
- Coquito
- Rompope
- Zabaione
