= Tymbark (company) =

Polish fruit juice beverage company

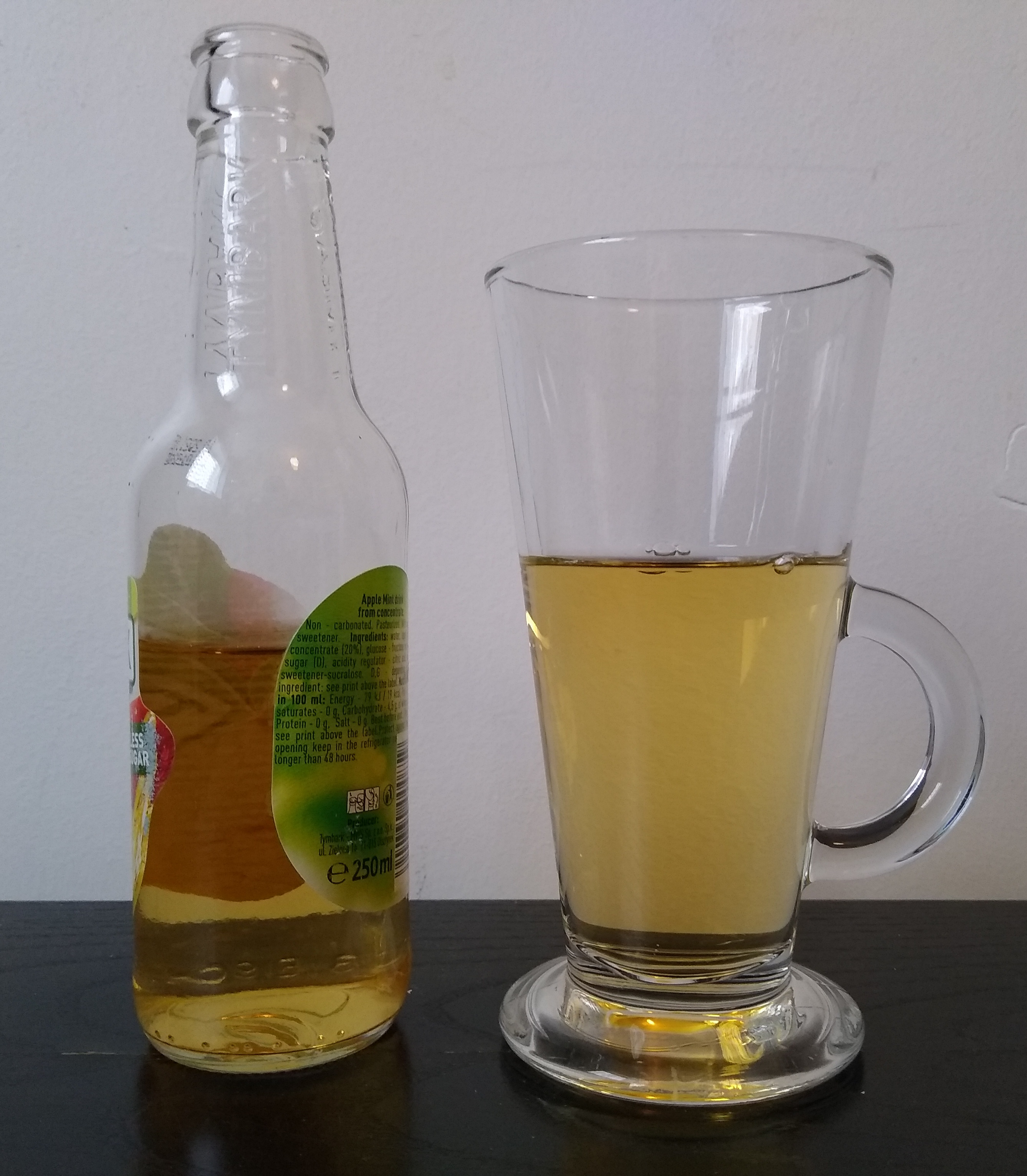
- Tymbark Apple Mint Drink
- Type: Subsidiary
- Founded: 1936
- Headquarters: Tymbark, Poland
- Parent: Maspex
- Website: tymbark.com

Tymbark SA, is a Polish fruit-juice beverage company headquartered in Tymbark, Lesser Poland. Its products are widely available throughout Poland, Central and Eastern Europe, and in the UK and Ireland. It is sold as Queens in Bulgaria, Relax in Czechia and Slovakia, and TopJoy in Hungary.

Tymbark is also a fruit and vegetable processing plant (launched in 1936 as a cooperative Owocarska, nationalized in 1950, and in 1995 was turned into a shareholder company of the State Treasury, now known as Podhale Company Food Industry "Tymbark" SA). Tymbark is a major producer of fruit and vegetable juices as well as jams, marmalades and fruit wines. In 1999, the company became part of Grupa Maspex Wadowice. The Tymbark brand was listed as Poland's 15th most popular brand in a survey by Wprost magazine.

== History ==
In 1936, Joseph Marek first established the Tymbark Fruit Growers Cooperative in Podhale, Poland. Formal registration of the Cooperative Act was made in the Circuit Hall in Nowy Sącz, in May 1937. Then the file was included in Podhalanska Fruit Growers Cooperative inon on the cap; at the beginning there were only eight, such as Ears Up, Hold Up, Smile, Will, Forever Together, I got you, How are you?. Now there are 490 different inscriptions in the caps, and many people such as children collect different ones as a game. Tymbark also conducted research by asking customers questions about their tastes. This attracted responses from several hundred thousand children in Poland. In 2007, Tymbark started its "From the Backyard to the Stadium" program which trained children for the Tymbark Cup where boys and girls in the under ten category play football in an official children's cup. The Tymbark Cup is the largest children cup in Poland. In the year 2011, 85,000 children across Poland were involved.

In 2010, Tymbark's new program began called, "I know what I drink" (Wiem co piję). This was clearly placed on each of Tymbark's products to make the customer sure the Tymbark product had no added sugar, preservatives or artificial colours. The products also included the GDA index value. Today one popular flavour is apple-mint.

On 24 March 2023 a fire broke out at the Tymbark factory in Olsztynek. The fire started in a storage tent containing beverages in plastic packaging, but was successfully contained by firefighters. No employees were injured and operations at the factory were unaffected.
