= Pan de Pascua =

Chilean cake associated with Christmas

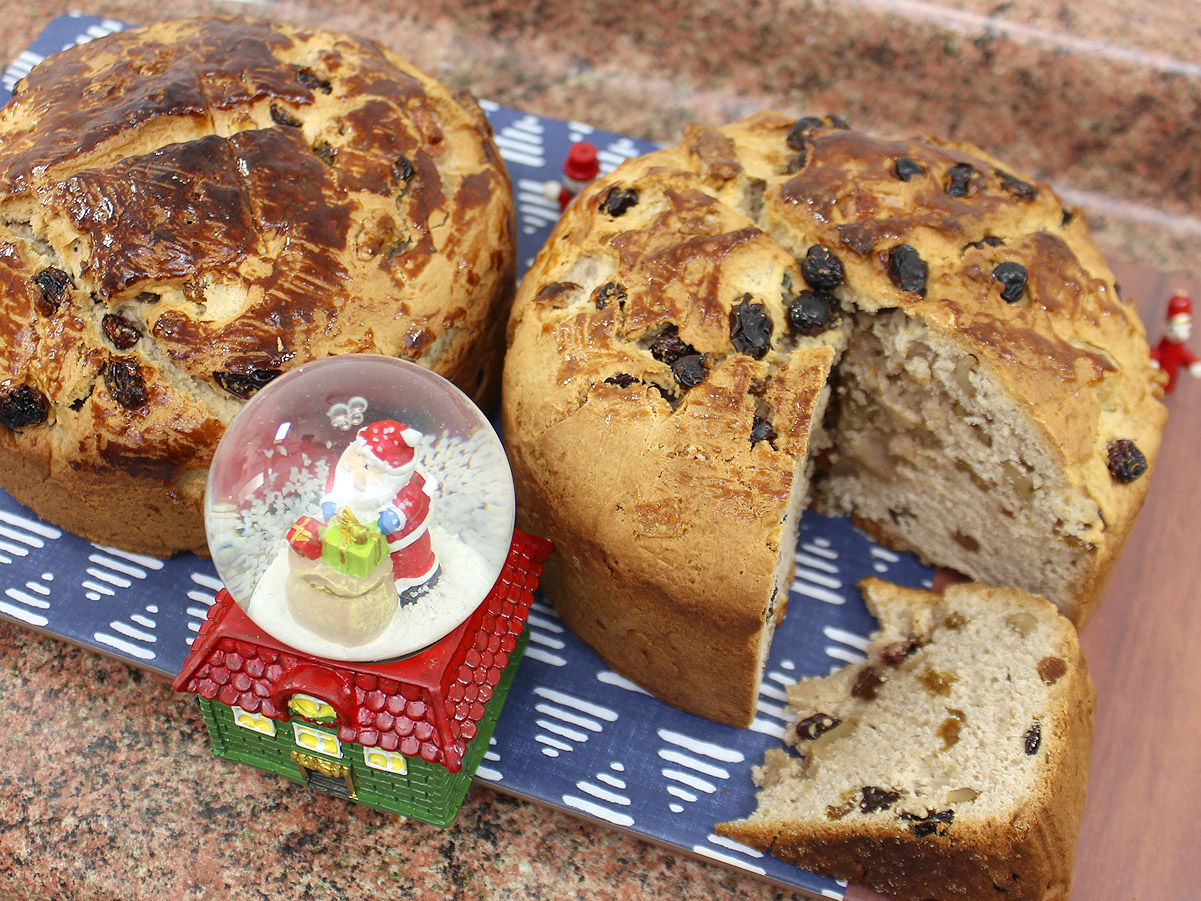
- Type: Sweet cake
- Place of origin: Chile
- Main ingredients: Ginger, honey, candied fruits, raisins, walnuts and almonds

Pan de Pascua is a Chilean cake traditionally eaten around Christmas time. Although "Pascua" primarily means Passover and secondarily means Easter, it also may mean Christmas and Epiphany. In Chile both Navidad and Pascua are used to refer to Christmas. Despite its name, it is an cake made from batter, and not a true bread. It is similar to a sweet sponge cake flavored with ginger and honey. It usually contains candied fruits, raisins, walnuts and almonds. Pan de Pascua was originally introduced to Chile by German immigrants. The Chilean version combines characteristics of the German Stollen and the Italian Panettone.
