= Modified milk ingredients =

Milk products in altered chemical state

Modified milk ingredients also called natural milk constituents are umbrella terms for a group of milk products which have an altered chemical state from that which is naturally found in milk. This includes casein, caseinates, whey products (including whey butter and whey cream), cultured milk products (including yogurt, sour cream and cultured buttermilk), ultrafiltered milk, milk protein concentrate, milk serum proteins and fats. Since the products vary considerably in composition, there is also a large variation in their nutritional value, and this has been a source of public concern as they are sometimes used to entirely replace milk or other more recognizable dairy products.
