= Maspex =

Polish multinational food company

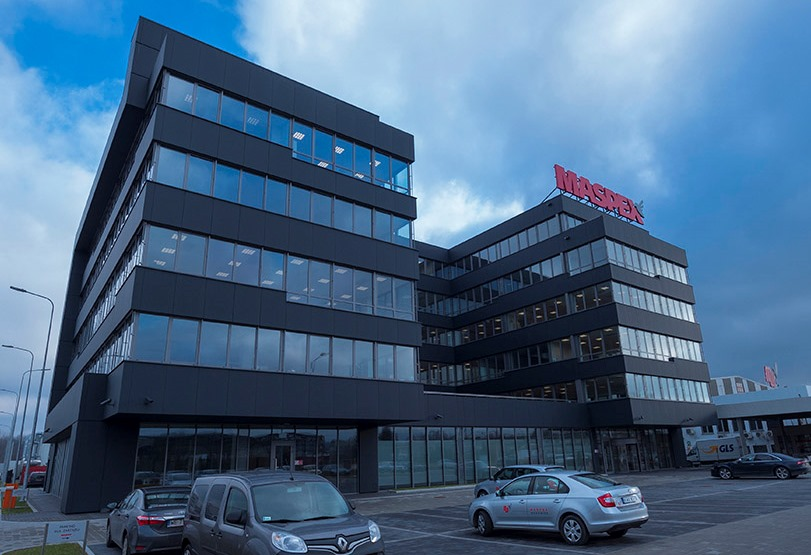
- Type: Partnership limited by shares
- Industry: Food industry
- Founded: 1990
- Headquarters: Wadowice, Poland
- Key people: Krzysztof Pawiński
- Products: juice, instant products, pasta
- Brands: List: Absolwent; Bols; Coffeeta; Kubuś; Lubella; Malma; Soplica; Tiger Energy Drink; Tymbark; Żubrówka
- Revenue: $3.7 billion (2023)
- Net income: 7,900,000 (2018)
- Total equity: $1 billion (2016)
- Number of employees: 9,200 (2021)
- Website: www.maspex.com

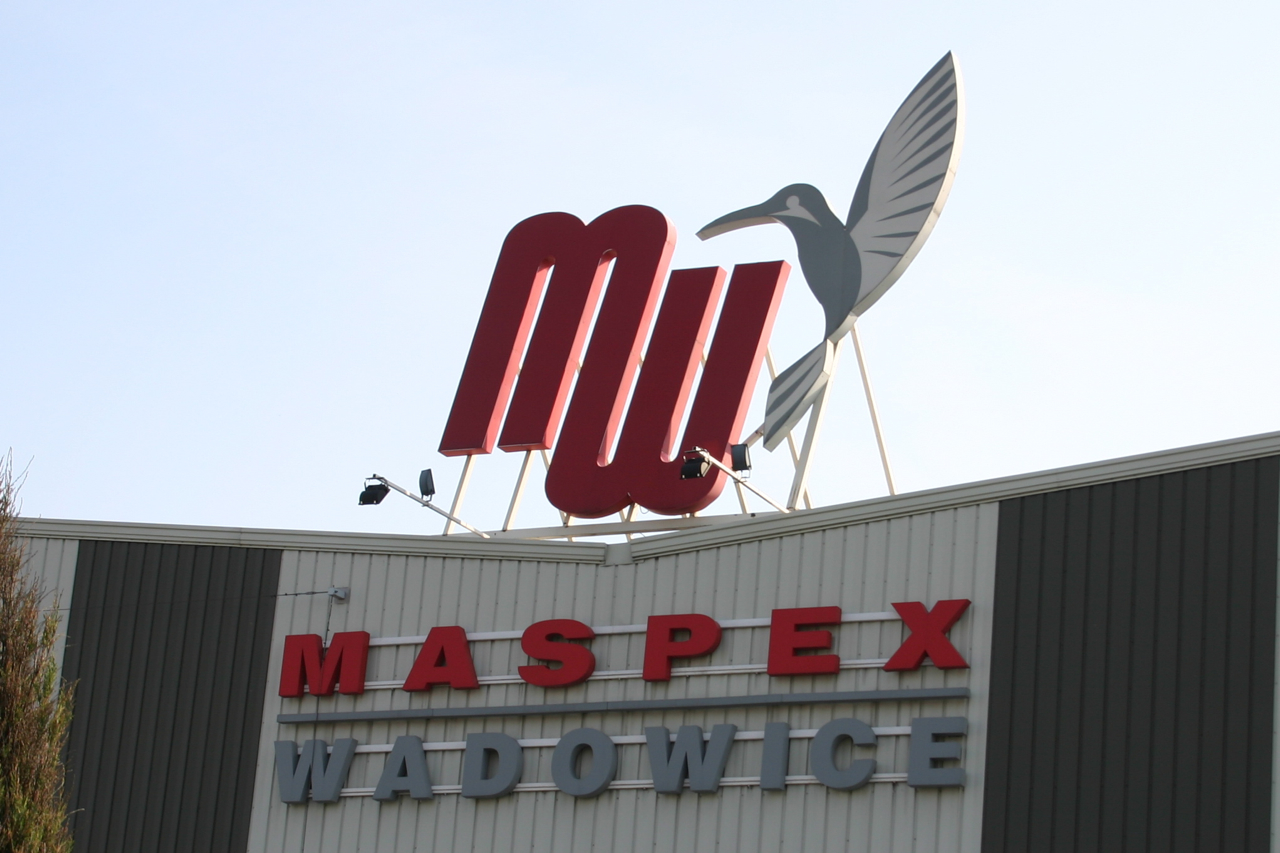
Company logo

Grupa Maspex Wadowice (short: Maspex) is a Polish multinational food company headquartered in Wadowice, Poland. It has developed mostly through acquisitions in Central and Eastern Europe and has become the owner of more than 20 companies and one of the largest food producers in this region.

== History ==
The company was founded in 1990. In 1993, it started the production of fruit tea, coffee and chocolate. In 1995, Maspex acquired Polska Żywność S.A. which specialized in the production of fruit and vegetable juices. Between 1998–1999, the company opened its first stores abroad in the Czech Republic, Romania, Hungary and Slovakia. In 1999 Maspex acquired Anin and Tymbark.

In 2000, the company opened a juice and beverage factory in Tychy. Two years later, other Maspex companies were established in Kaliningrad and Moscow. In March 2003, the Maspex Group purchased the Lubella company, thus extending its offer to include pasta, breakfast cereals, groats and flours. In September of the same year, the Group bought shares of Polski Lek – a producer of vitamin preparations and effervescent tablets.

In 2004, the company established a representative office in Ukraine, and in December of the same year it purchased a part of Walmark, a company dealing in the production of juices for the Czech and Slovak markets, and all shares of Olympos – a Hungarian producer of juices, nectars and fruit drinks. In 2005, the group acquired shares in: Plusssz Vitamin Kft, Apenta (a brand of Hungarian mineral water) and Queen's – a Bulgarian juice producer.

Two years later, in Romania, Maspex acquired shares in Arnos – a pasta producer. In 2009, the Logistics Center in Tychy was launched. In the same year, Maspex opened a production and warehouse complex in Romania. In 2010, the Group entered the category of energy drinks by starting cooperation with the "Equal Opportunities" Foundation and Dariusz Tiger Michalczewski. In 2011, the company was present in 30 countries in Europe but also in the USA and Canada. In 2012, the company from Wadowice purchased Salatini and Capollini, Romanian brands of pretzels and crackers. In 2018, Maspex launched a production complex and a logistics center at the Lubella plant in Lublin, and then opened a production and logistics complex at the Tymbark plant in Olsztynek.

Since 2019, on the basis of an agreement with the Swiss concern Nestlé, Maspex has an exclusive license for the production and distribution of Nestea tea drinks in most Central European markets. Initially, from June, it only covered Hungary, Romania and Bulgaria, but in January 2020 it was extended to Poland, the Czech Republic, Slovakia, Lithuania, Latvia and Estonia. In February 2022, Maspex Group acquired the Żubrówka, Soplica, Absolwent and Bols alcohol brands from the Russian company Roust International for $980 million.

In June 2026, Maspex acquired an 80% stake in Ukrainian bottled water and soft drink producer Karpatski Mineralni Vody.

== Products ==
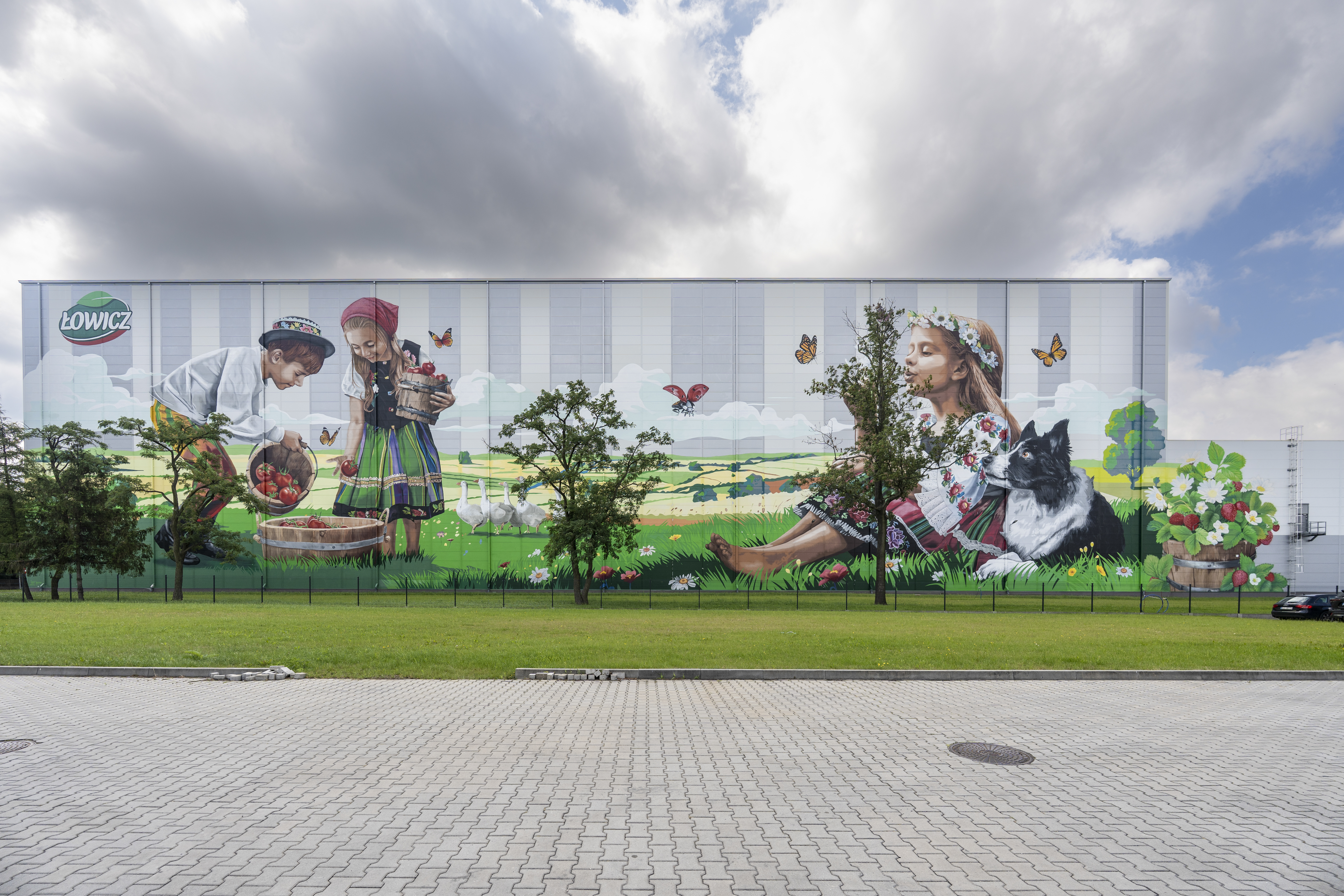
Production facilities in Łowicz

The company owns 63 brands and offers a total of over 2,300 products. Some of the brands offered by Maspex include Kubuś and Tymbark, Life (fruit juice), Coffeeta (coffee cream powder) and Lubella (pasta).

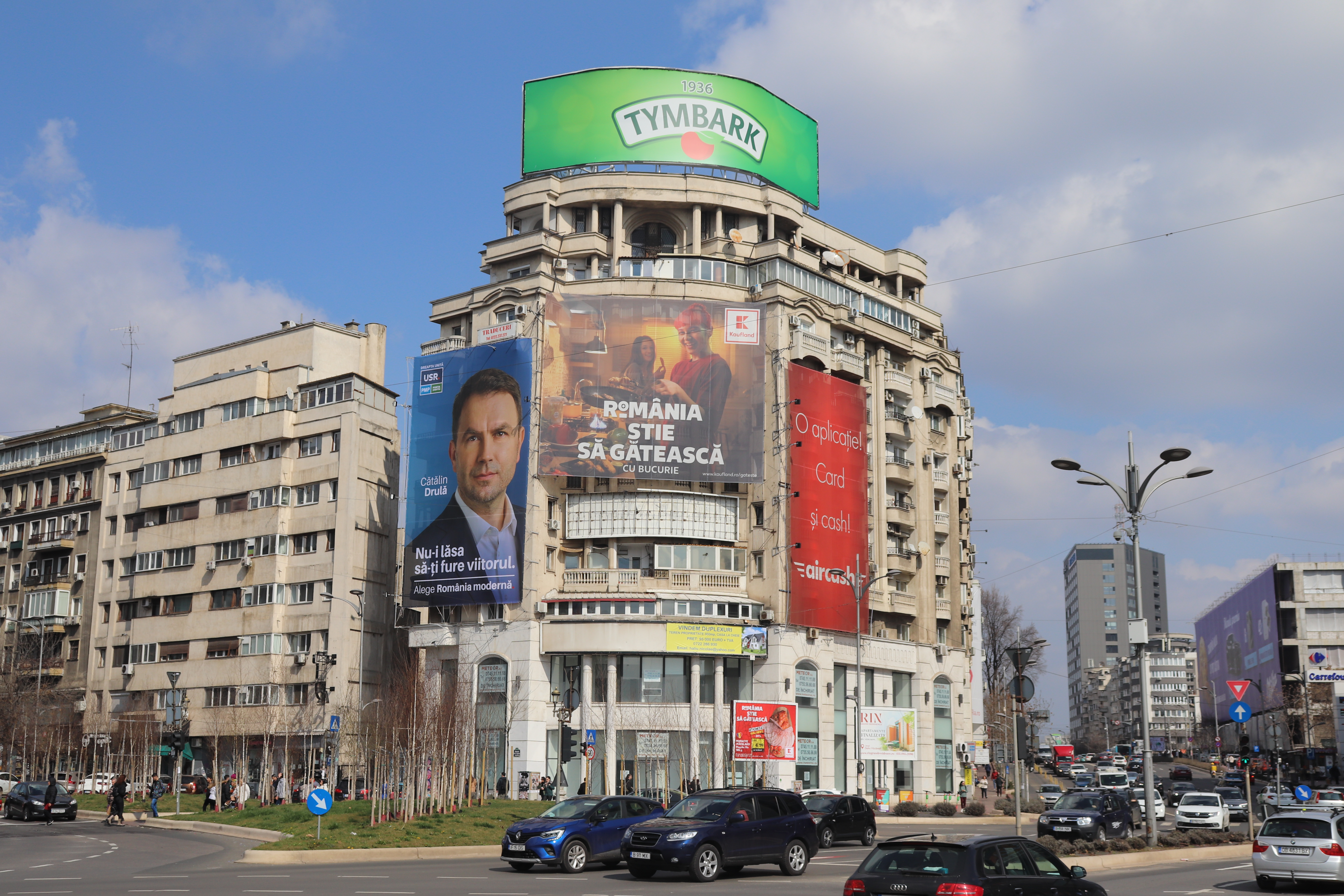
Tymbark advertisements in Bucharest

== Social campaigns ==
The company has been involved in a number of social campaigns such as the Tymbark Cup football tournament organized by the Polish Football Association, which since 2007 has been sponsored by Tymbark, one of the brands controlled by the Maspex Group. It is aimed at searching for young talents and promoting football among schoolchildren. It confers titles of Polish Champion in various age categories both in the boys' and girls' divisions, the final matches being played at the National Stadium in Warsaw. The tournament has started the careers of such players as Piotr Zieliński, Paulina Dudek and Arkadiusz Milik.

The Kubuś Friends of Nature (Kubusiowi Przyjaciele Natury) is an educational project supported by the Kubuś brand, which raises ecological awareness among children in kindergartens across Poland.

Since 2018, the company has been participating in the Parasol Historii project, whose objective is to uphold the memory of the Warsaw Uprising and the people who took part in it. As part of the project, the company provides help to the still living veterans of the uprising and conducts educational activities under the aegis of the Warsaw Rising Museum.

== See also ==
- Economy of Poland
- List of companies of Poland
- List of food companies
