= Tamagozake =

Drink consisting of heated sake, sugar, and raw egg

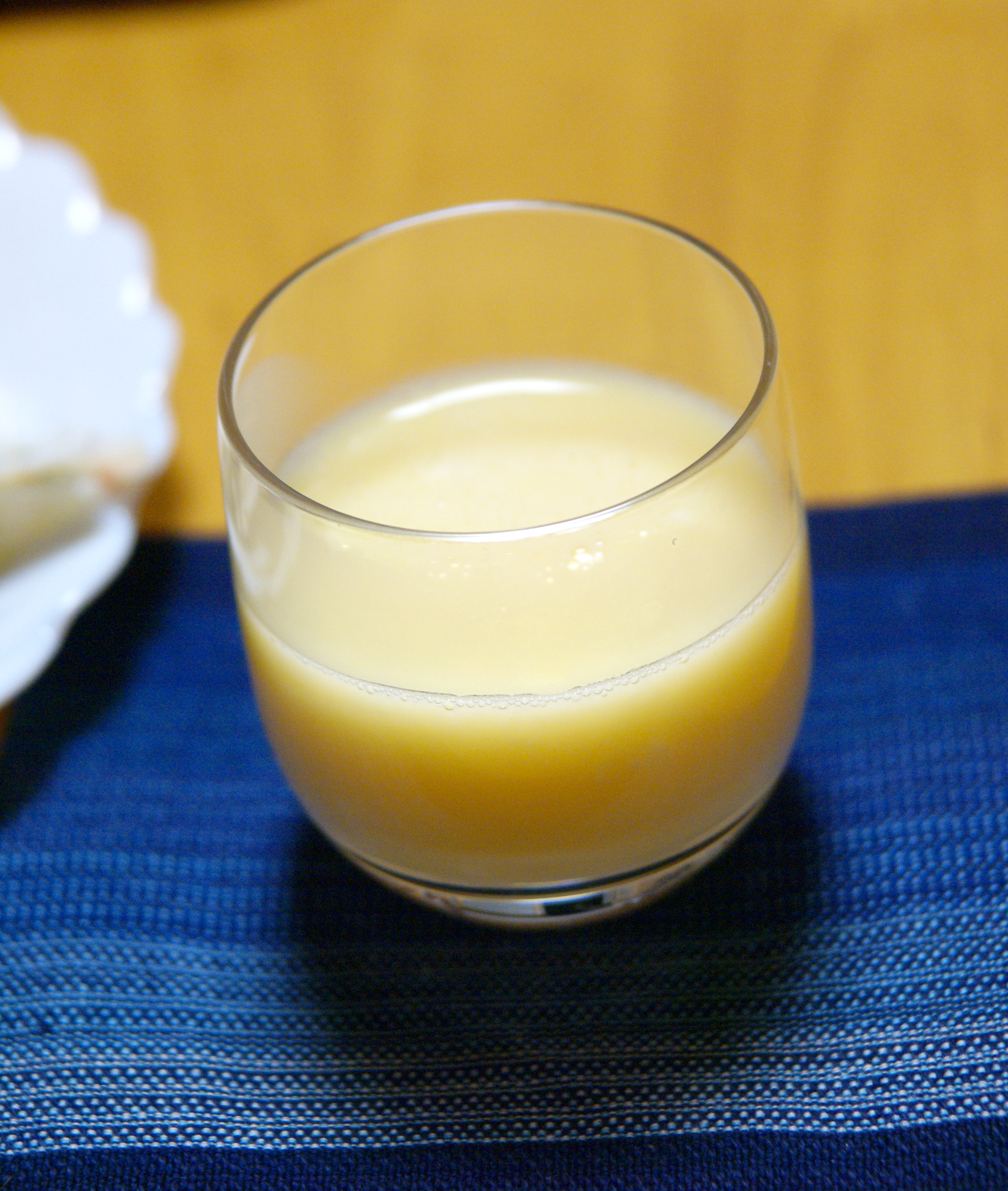
- Tamagozake
- Type: Cocktail
- Ingredients: Raw egg yolk; sake; Honey or sugar
- Base spirit: Sake
- Served: Hot
- Preparation: The raw egg yolk and honey/sugar are mixed into 3/4 cup hot sake .

Tamagozake (卵酒 or 玉子酒; "egg sake") is a Japanese alcoholic drink consisting of heated sake, sugar, and a raw egg.

In Japan, tamagozake is consumed as a folk remedy for colds. The practice originated due to the high nutritional value of eggs at a time when eggs were costly.
