= Coquito =

Puerto Rican rum and coconut milk cocktail

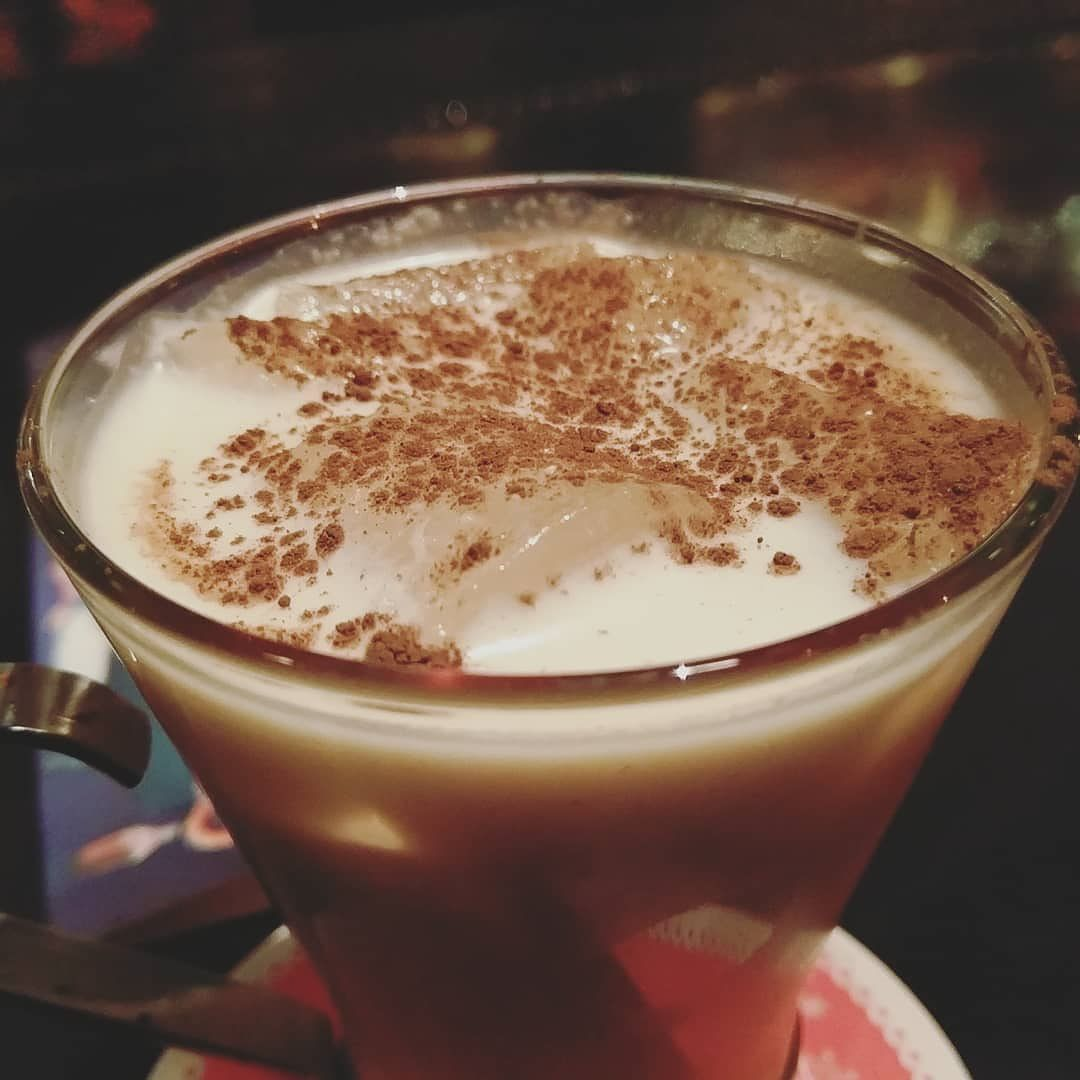
- A coquito in a glass
- Type: Mixed drink
- Ingredients: Coconut milk; Coconut cream; Puerto Rican Rum; Condensed milk; Evaporated milk; Egg yolk; Vanilla and Cinnamon, for taste
- Standard drinkware: Shot glass
- Standard garnish: Cinnamon, nutmeg
- Served: Strained and chilled
- Preparation: Place ingredients into blender and blend until fully mixed. Chill blended drink until cold and serve in shot glasses. Garnish with lightly sprinkled cinnamon or nutmeg.

Coquito (lit. 'little coconut') is a traditional Christmas drink that originated in Puerto Rico. The coconut-based alcoholic beverage is similar to eggnog, and is sometimes referred to as Puerto Rican eggnog. The mixed drink is made with Puerto Rican rum, coconut milk, cream of coconut, sweetened condensed milk, vanilla, nutmeg, clove, and cinnamon.

== History ==
Coquito was originally made in Puerto Rico, and drinks similar to coquito are found throughout the Caribbean. The drink was inspired by British and American eggnogs, but the Spanish made their own version of eggnog and combined it with coconut milk and local rum, creating coquito. Although milk and sugar were its basic ingredients, Puerto Ricans altered it by adding coconut.

The recipe has five main ingredients but is not limited to these:

- Evaporated milk
- Coconut milk
- Coconut cream
- Puerto Rican rum
- Sweetened condensed milk.

The Puerto Rican version resembles eggnog and is usually served after dinner in a shot glass. Some prepare the drink with eggs. The drink is known to be sweet and strong, with a generous amount of rum.

Many families have their own variations of the recipe, and these are passed down through generations. The drink can be made as early as Thanksgiving and as late as Día de los Reyes. That being said, the drink makes its main appearance during the Christmas season.

Coquito has become much more popular recently. Some supermarkets and grocery stores sell pre-made bottles of coquito. There are also competitions like Coquito Masters, an annual event held at the Museo del Barrio in New York City.

American TV hosts and journalists have helped to publicize the drink. Talk show host Jimmy Fallon is reportedly a fan, and has mentioned the drink occasionally in episodes of The Tonight Show. David Begnaud, regularly associated with Puerto Rico since his coverage of Hurricane Maria and other events on the island, famously served the hosts and staff of CBS This Morning with several bottles of coquito on the show's 2021 New Year's Eve broadcast.

== Variations ==
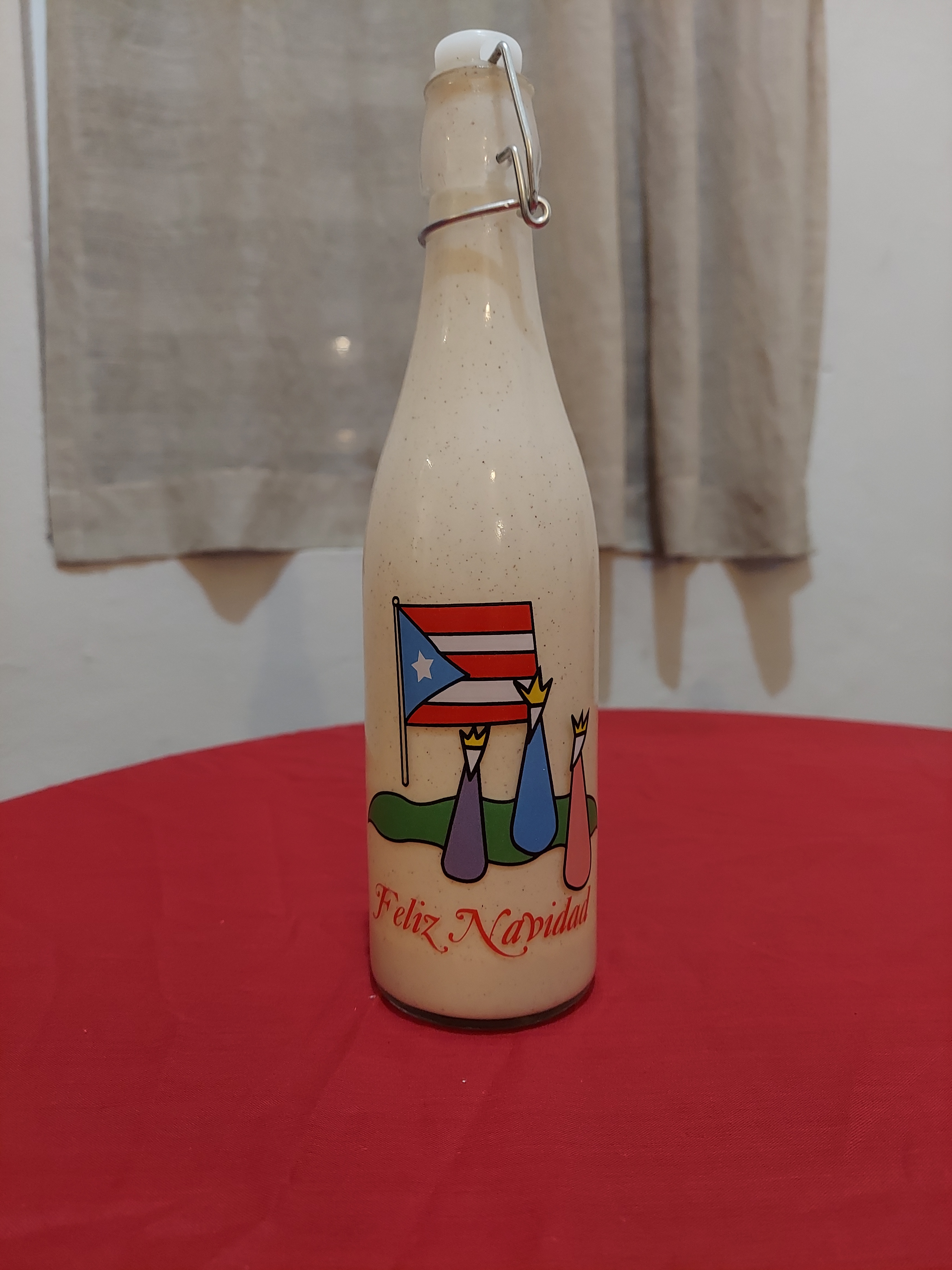
Coquito in a bottle at a restaurant in Ponce, Puerto Rico, during the Christmas season

There are many variations of coquito, all based on their location and family traditions. Although all these variations are unique in their own way, they often have one thing in common, and generally that is rum. Some people prefer to make it with another alcohol, such as Spanish liqueur 43, or add bitters.

Coquito has become a staple not only for Puerto Ricans but for other Caribbean and Latin communities, and all versions add a personal touch. Seed and nut milk can be added, with pistachio being the most popular. Other additions include Nutella, coffee, masala chai, fresh fruits, prunes, citrus, and cream cheese with guava.

Pitorro rum, which ranges from 80 to 100 proof, is also used to make coquito. Coquito made with pittorro is served in shot glasses sprinkled with cinnamon and nutmeg.

While coquito is strongly associated with Christmas it also has taken part on Thanksgiving. Thanksgiving is celebrated in Puerto Rico and Puerto Ricans living outside the island. Traditional thanksgiving flavor are incorporated into the drink such as sweet potato, pumpkin, pecan, and cranberries.

== Preparation ==
Depending on the ingredients of choice, coquito can be prepared over the stovetop or in a blender. Gently cooking the ingredients thickens the drink, keeps it from separating, and gives it a longer shelf life. This method usually contains eggs. Rum, vanilla, and other extracts are added after the liquid cools. Combining all ingredients, including ground spices, in the blender—without the addition of eggs—makes a quicker version. This can also result in the drink separating after a few minutes because the fat in the coconut solidifies, causing a chunky coquito with lumps. Coquito is then poured into glass bottles with one or two cinnamon sticks. After coquito is prepared and chilled for a few hours, it is ready to be served. However, it is best made two weeks or more in advance for fullest flavor.

== Events ==
El Museo del Barrio in New York City hosts an annual coquito tasting contest called Coquito Masters on Three Kings Day in January. The competition was first established in 2002 and continues each year.
