= Helen Bullock =

Helen Bullock may refer to:

- Helen Bullock (politician) (born 1965), Chinese-born Australian politician
- Helen Bullock (historian) (1905–1995), American historian
- Helen Louise Bullock (1836–1927), musical educator, temperance reformer, women's prison reformer, suffragist, and philanthropist
