= Christmas pudding =

Steamed sweet dried-fruit pudding

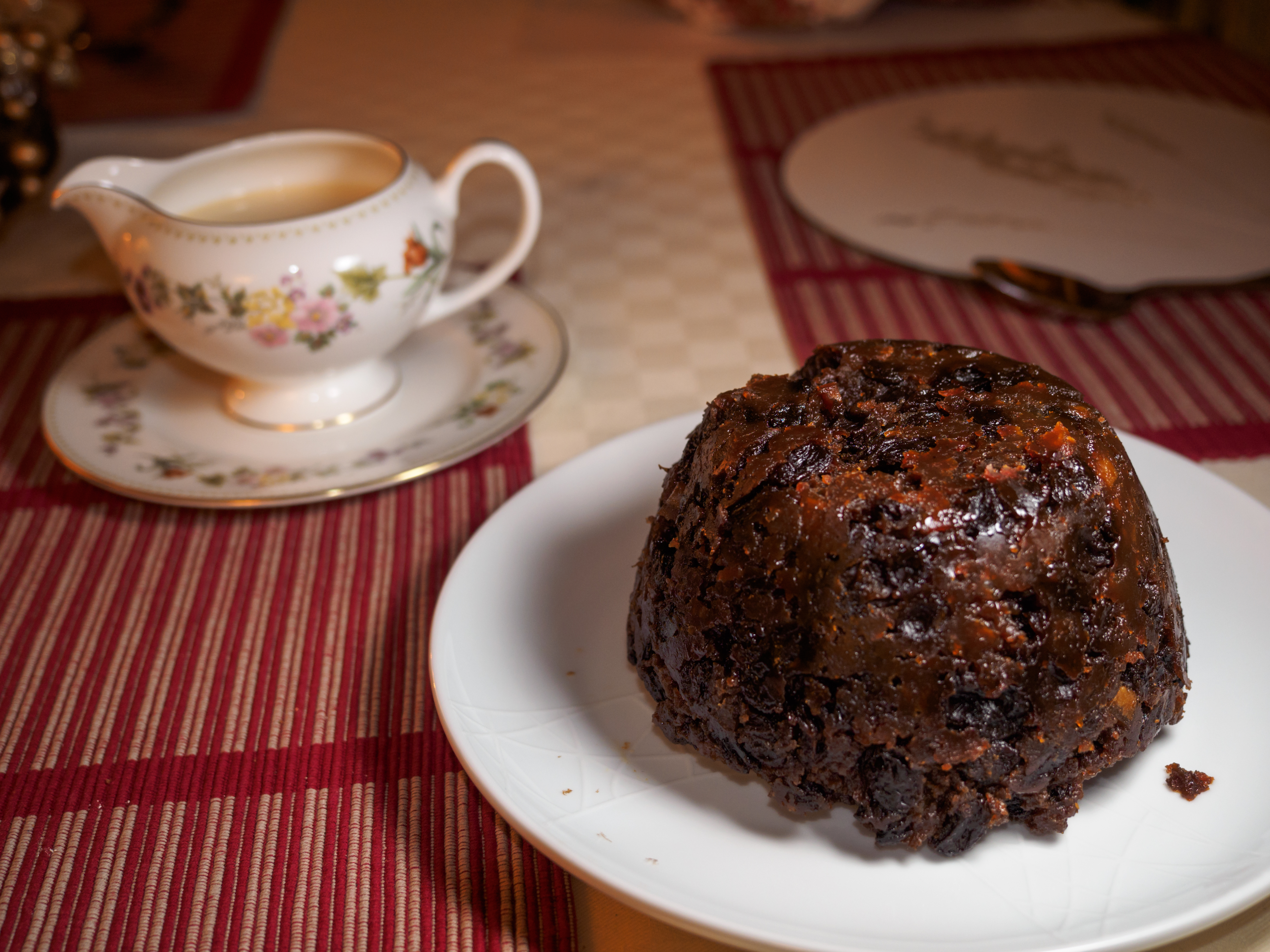
- A Christmas pudding
- Alternative names: Plum pudding, pud
- Type: Pudding cake
- Place of origin: England
- Serving temperature: Warm or cold
- Main ingredients: Breadcrumbs, dried fruit, sugar, treacle, suet, spices

Christmas pudding is a sweet boiled or steamed pudding traditionally served as part of Christmas dinner in Britain. It has its origins in medieval England, with early recipes making use of dried fruit, suet, breadcrumbs, flour, eggs and spice, along with liquid such as milk or fortified wine. Later, recipes became more elaborate. In 1845, cookery writer Eliza Acton wrote the first recipe for a dish called "Christmas pudding".

The dish is sometimes known as plum pudding (though this can also refer to other kinds of boiled pudding involving dried fruit). The word "plum" was used then for what has been called a "raisin" since the 18th century, (Note: The Oxford English Dictionary cites this use as early as 1653 by John Lilburne and also, inter alia, in Samuel Johnson's Dictionary of 1755.) and the pudding does not contain plums in the modern sense of the word.

== Basics ==
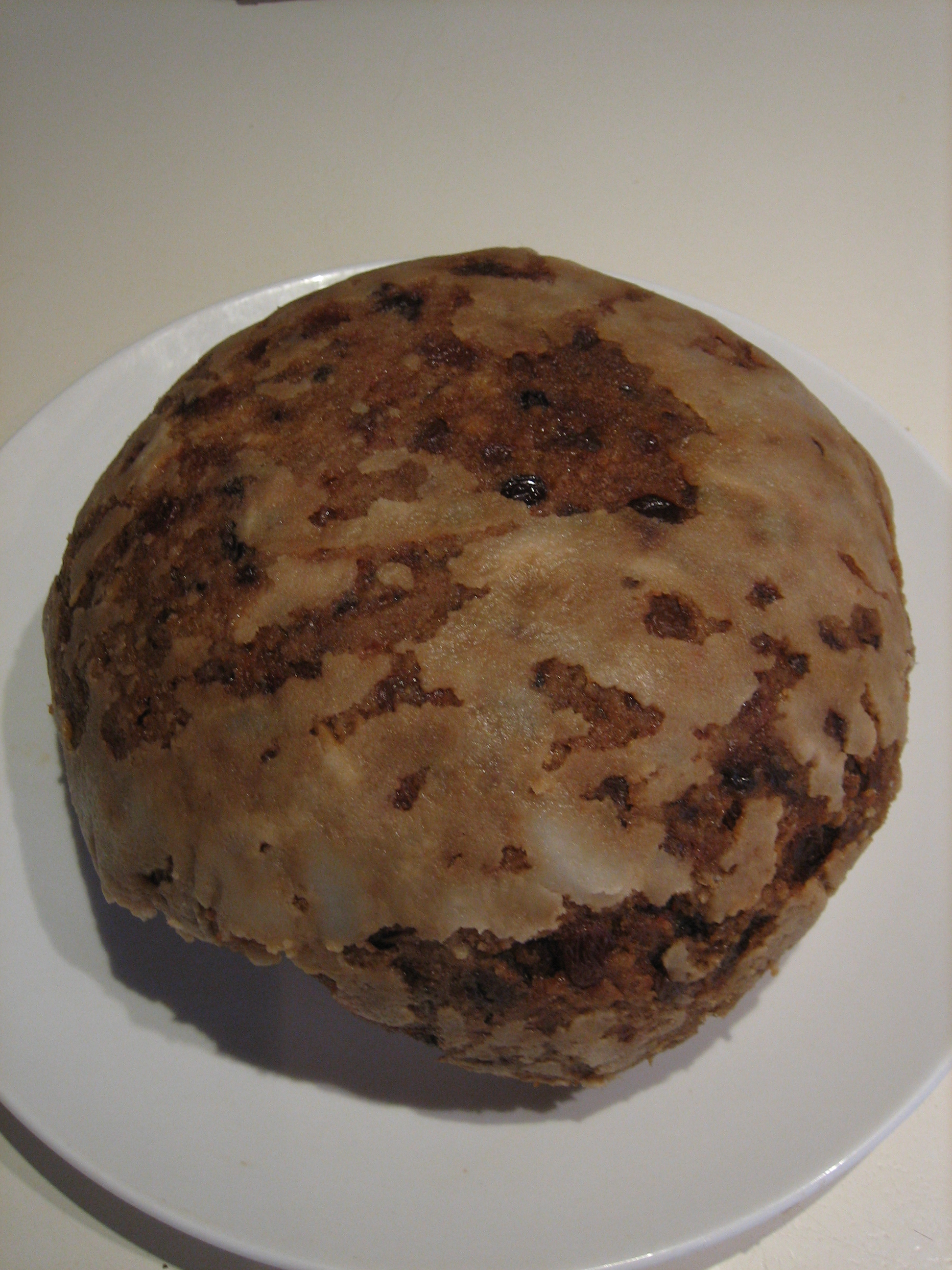
A traditional bag-boiled Christmas pudding still showing the "skin"

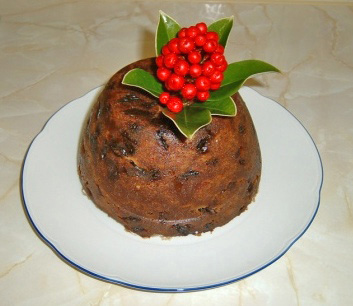
A Christmas pudding decorated with skimmia rather than holly

Some households have their own recipes for Christmas pudding, which may be handed down through families for generations. Essentially the recipe brings together what traditionally were expensive or luxurious ingredients — notably the sweet spices that are so important in developing its distinctive rich aroma, and usually made with suet. The pudding is very dark, almost black in appearance due to the dark sugars and black treacle in most recipes, and its long cooking time. The mixture can be moistened with the juice of citrus fruits, brandy and other alcohol (some recipes call for dark beers such as mild, stout or porter).

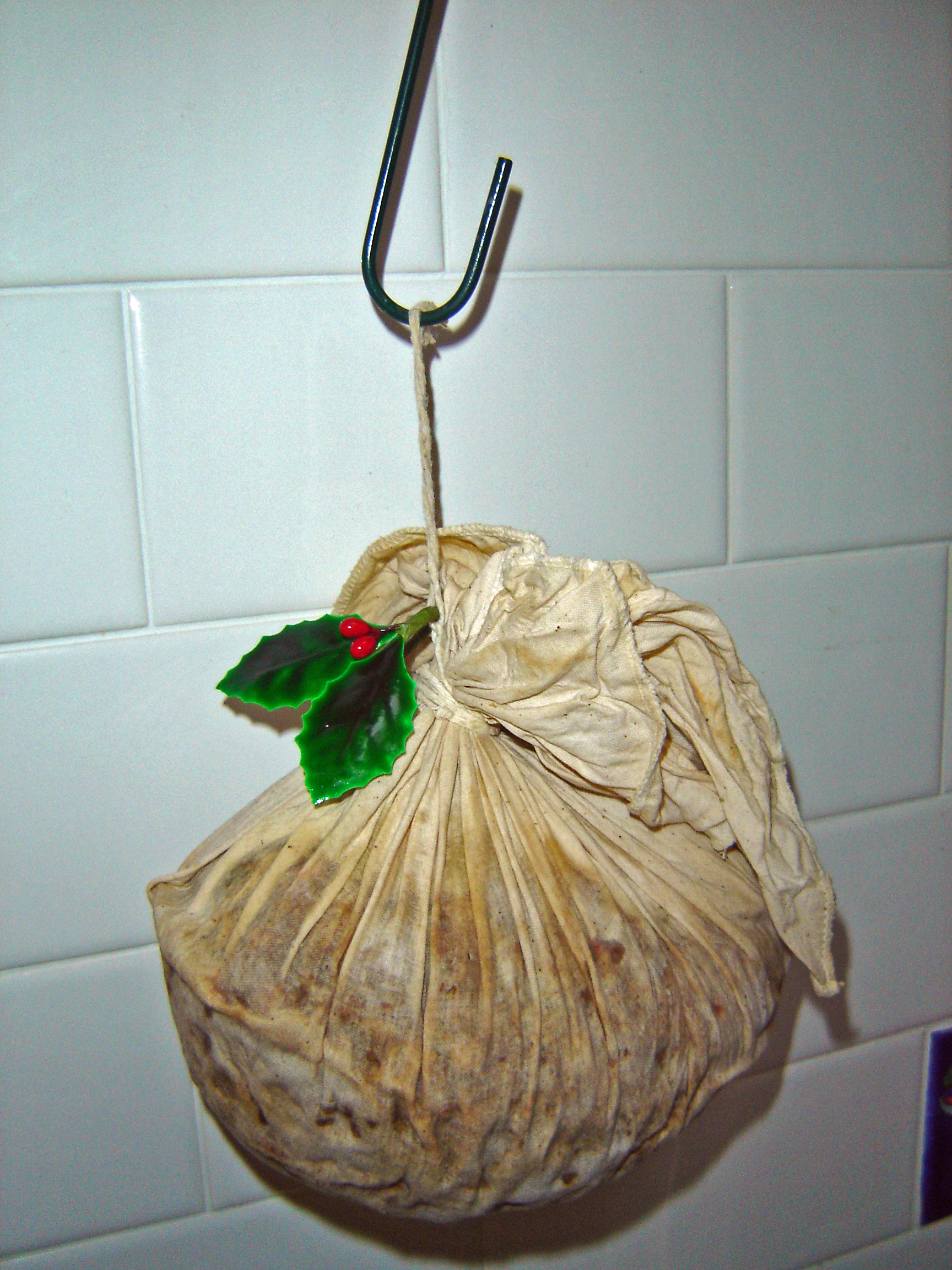
Christmas puddings are often dried out on hooks for weeks prior to serving in order to enhance the flavour. This pudding has been prepared with a traditional cloth rather than a basin.

Prior to the 19th century, the English Christmas pudding was boiled in a pudding cloth, and often represented as round. The Victorian era fashion involved putting the mixture into a basin and then steaming it, followed by unwrapping the pudding, placing it on a platter, and decorating the top with a sprig of holly.

Initial cooking usually involves steaming for many hours. Most pre-20th century recipes assume that the pudding will then be served immediately, but in the second half of the 20th century, it became more usual to reheat puddings on the day of serving, and recipes changed slightly to allow for maturing. To serve, the pudding is reheated by steaming once more, and may be dressed with warm brandy which is set alight. It can be eaten with hard sauce (usually brandy butter or rum butter), cream, lemon cream, ice cream, custard, or sweetened béchamel, and is sometimes sprinkled with caster sugar.

== History ==
=== Legends ===
There is a popular myth that plum pudding's association with Christmas goes back to a custom in medieval England that the "pudding should be made on the 25th Sunday after Trinity, that it be prepared with 13 ingredients to represent Christ and the 12 apostles, and that every family member stir it in turn from east to west to honour the Magi and their journey in that direction". However, recipes for plum puddings appear mainly, if not entirely, in the 17th century and later. One of the earliest plum pudding recipes is given by Mary Kettilby in her 1714 book A Collection of above Three Hundred Receipts in Cookery, Physick and Surgery. There is a popular and unsubstantiated myth that in 1714, George I of Great Britain (sometimes known as the Pudding King) requested that plum pudding be served as part of his royal feast in his first Christmas in England.

=== Ancestors ===
Christmas pudding's possible ancestors include savoury puddings such as those in Harley MS 279, croustades, malaches whyte, creme boiled (a kind of stirred custard), and sippets. Various ingredients and methods of these older recipes appear in early plum puddings. An early example of a bag pudding (without fruit) is "fraunche mele" in the Liber Cure Cocorum Pudding "had the great merit" of not needing to be cooked in an oven, something "most lower class households did not have". Pudding predecessors often contained meat, as well as sweet ingredients, and prior to being steamed in a cloth the ingredients may have been stuffed into the gut or stomach of an animal, like haggis or sausages.

As techniques for meat preserving improved in the 18th century, the savoury element of both the mince pie and the plum pottage diminished as the sweet content increased. People began adding dried fruit and sugar. The mince pie kept its name, though the pottage was increasingly referred to as plum pudding. As plum pudding, it became widespread as a feast dish, not necessarily associated with Christmas, and usually served with beef. It makes numerous appearances in 18th- and 19th-century satire as a symbol of Britishness, including the Gilray cartoon, The Plumb-pudding in danger. Plum pudding was regularly served to the royal household of George III on Sundays.

=== Victorian era ===
It was not until the 1830s that a boiled cake of flour, fruits, suet, sugar and spices, all topped with holly, made a definite appearance, becoming more and more associated with Christmas. In her bestselling 1845 book Modern Cookery for Private Families, the East Sussex cook Eliza Acton was the first to refer to it as "Christmas Pudding". The pudding became popular part of Christmas tradition in the United Kingdom partially due to Charles Dickens' 1843 novel A Christmas Carol.

=== British Empire ===
The custom of eating Christmas pudding was carried to many parts of the world by British colonists. It is a common dish in Australia, New Zealand, Canada, and South Africa. Throughout the colonial period, the pudding was a symbol of unity throughout the British Empire, a message that was widely promoted through the media.

In 1927, the Empire Marketing Board (EMB) wrote a letter to the Master of the Royal Household, requesting a copy of the recipe used to make the Christmas pudding for the royal family. The King and Queen granted Leo Amery, the head of the EMB, permission to use the recipe in a publication in the following November. The royal chef, Henry Cédard, provided it. In order to distribute the recipe, the EMB had to overcome two challenges: size and ingredients. First, the original recipe was measured to serve 40 people, including the entire royal family and their guests. The EMB was challenged to rework the recipe to serve only 8 people. Second, the ingredients used to make the pudding had to be changed to reflect the ideals of the Empire. The origins of each ingredient were carefully manipulated to represent some of the Empire's many colonies. Brandy from Cyprus and nutmeg from the West Indies, which had been inadvertently forgotten in previous recipes, made special appearances. However, there were a number of colonies that produced the same foodstuffs. The final recipe included Australian currants, South African stoned raisins, Canadian apples, Jamaican rum and English Beer, among other ingredients all sourced from somewhere in the Empire. After finalising the ingredients, the royal recipe was sent out to national newspapers and to popular women's magazines. Copies were also printed and handed out to the public for free. The recipe was a phenomenal success, as thousands of requests for the recipe flooded the EMB office.

In 1931, an annual Christmas market for the People's Dispensary for Sick Animals was held at the Royal Albert Hall on 24 and 25 November. A 10-ton Christmas pudding, the largest ever created up until that time, was featured. The recipe became known as the "Prince of Wales' Empire Christmas Pudding". The Times newspaper noted "The Lord Mayor of London has promised to give the pudding its first 'stir'. He will be followed by the High Commissioners of the Dominions, and afterwards the general public will have the chance of stirring it". The Prince of Wales (later Edward VIII) was then a patron of the PDSA charity. It was then divided up into 11,208 smaller puddings, which were distributed amongst the poor throughout the country. Manchester and Salford, for example, received 512 each.

=== United States ===
In America, the tradition of the Christmas pudding had already arrived in pre-independence days. A book entitled The Williamsburg Art of Cookery by Helen Bullock was published in the U.S. as early as 1742. Among the ingredients she includes a pound of each of a variety of dried fruits and sugar, plus half a pound each of candied peel (citron, orange and lemon). She also adds one pint of brandy and 12 eggs.

Jane Cunningham Croly published a 19th-century recipe for plum pudding contributed to Jennie June's American Cookery Book by the American poet sisters Alice Cary and Phoebe Cary. It was made as bread pudding, by soaking stale bread in milk then adding suet, candied citron, nutmeg, eggs, raisins and brandy. It was a moulded dessert, cooked in boiling water for several hours, and served with a sweet wine sauce.

== Wishing and other traditions ==
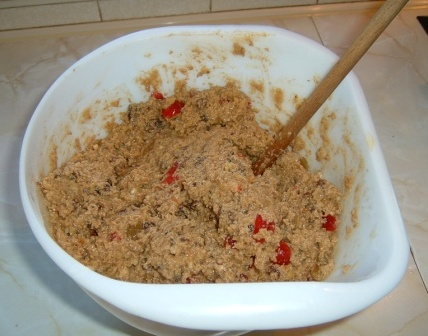
Traditionally, every member of the household stirs the pudding, while making a wish.

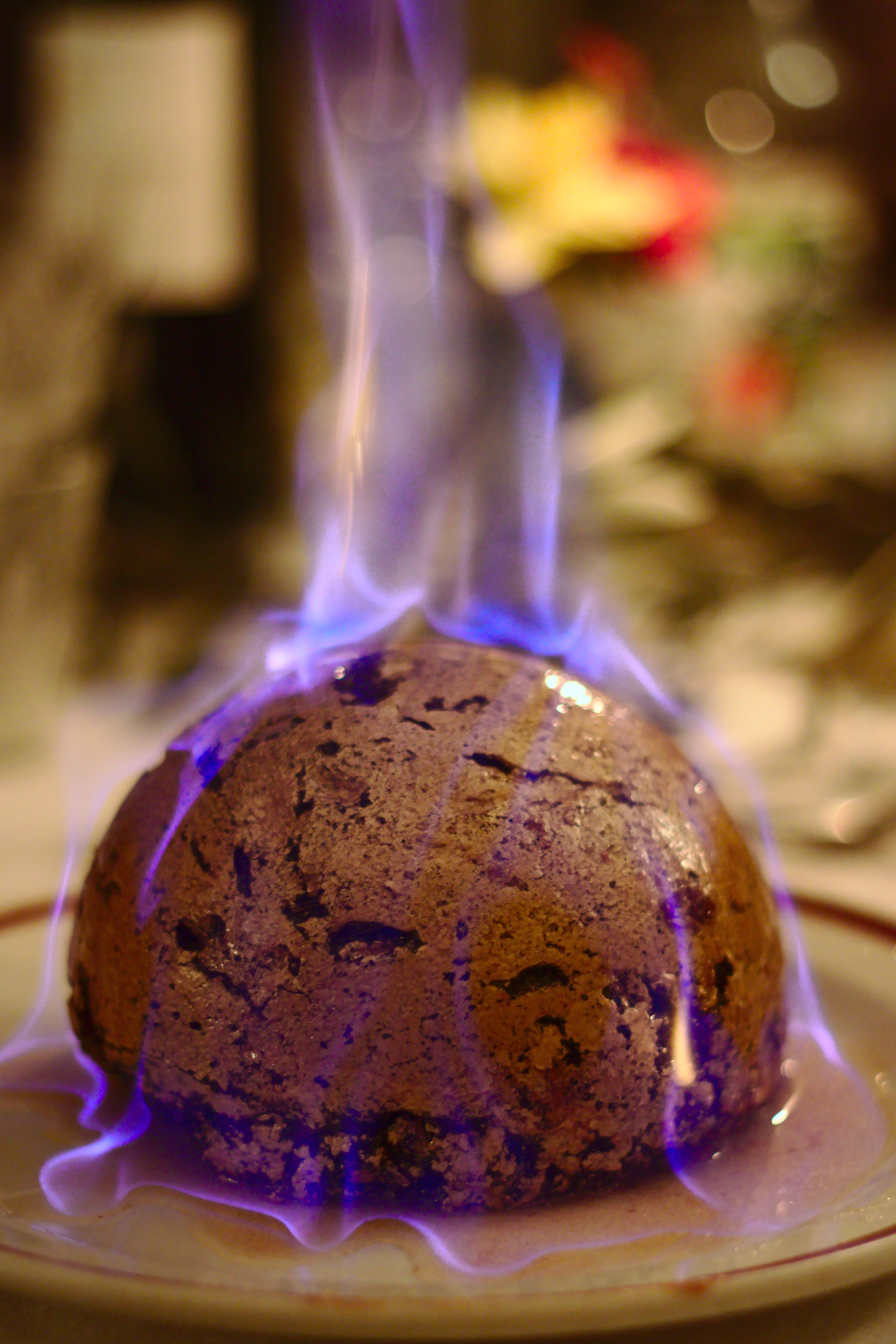
A Christmas pudding being flamed after brandy has been poured over it

It was in the late Victorian era that "Stir up Sunday" (the fifth Sunday before Christmas) began to be associated with the making of Christmas pudding. The collect this Sunday in the Church of England's Book of Common Prayer begins with the words "Stir up, we beseech thee, O Lord, the wills of thy faithful people; that they, plenteously bringing forth the fruit of good works...". This led to the custom of preparing Christmas puddings on that day which became known as Stir-up Sunday, associated with the stirring of the Christmas pudding.

Initially probably a schoolchild joke, latterly the day became known as "Stir-up Sunday".

It was common practice to include small silver coins in the pudding mixture, which could be kept by the person whose serving included them. The usual choice was a silver threepence or a sixpence. The coin was believed to bring wealth in the coming year, and came from an earlier tradition of putting tokens in a cake, which had died out by the 20th century (see Twelfth Cake).

Other tokens are also known to have been included, such as a tiny wishbone (to bring good luck), a silver thimble (for thrift) or an anchor (to symbolise safe harbour).

Once turned out of its basin, decorated with holly, doused in brandy (or occasionally rum), and flamed (or "fired"), the pudding is traditionally brought to the table ceremoniously, and greeted with a round of applause. In 1843, Charles Dickens describes the scene in A Christmas Carol:

Mrs. Cratchit left the room alone – too nervous to bear witnesses – to take the pudding up and bring it in... Hallo! A great deal of steam! The pudding was out of the copper. A smell like a washing-day! That was the cloth. A smell like an eating-house and a pastrycook's next door to each other, with a laundress's next door to that! That was the pudding! In half a minute Mrs. Cratchit entered – flushed, but smiling proudly – with the pudding, like a speckled cannon-ball, so hard and firm, blazing in half of half-a-quartern of ignited brandy, and bedight with Christmas holly stuck into the top.

== See also ==
- Figgy pudding
- Christmas cake
- Fruitcake
- Frumenty, an early English dish made with wheat, fruits, and nuts, sometimes served on holidays
- Mincemeat, another common Christmas food incorporating suet
- Panettone
- Stollen
- List of Christmas dishes
- List of steamed foods
- The Adventure of the Christmas Pudding, an Agatha Christie story
