= Salmagundi =

English dish

- Alternative names: Salmi
- Type: Salad
- Place of origin: England
- Main ingredients: Meats, seafood, vegetables, fruit, leaves, nuts and flowers, oil, vinegar, spices

Salmagundi (alternatively salmagundy or sallid magundi) is a cold dish or salad made from different ingredients which may include meat, seafood, eggs, cooked and raw vegetables, fruits, or pickles. In English culture, the term does not relate to a single recipe but describes the grand presentation of a large plated salad of many disparate ingredients. These can be arranged in layers or geometrical designs on a plate or mixed. The ingredients are then drizzled with a dressing. The dish includes a wide range of flavours and colours and textures on a single plate. Often recipes allow the cook to add various ingredients which may be available at hand, producing many variations of the dish. Flowers from broom and sweet violet are often used.

== Etymology ==
There is debate over the sense and origin of the word. The word salmagundi may be derived from the obscure 16th-century French word salmigondis which means disparate assembly of things, ideas or people, forming an incoherent whole. It may also come from the Italian phrase salami conditi (pickled meat). In Thomas Blount's Glossographia (1656), salamagundi is described as "a dish of meat made of cold Turkey and other ingredients". Helen Sabeeri points out that the essential root word of salmigondis is 'sal- (salt or seasoning) and that the dish is 'usually a fish of some sort'. It seems to appear in English for the first time in the 17th century as a dish of cooked meats, seafood, vegetables, fruit, leaves, nuts and flowers and dressed with oil, vinegar and spices. Salmagundi is used figuratively in modern English to mean "any miscellaneous mixture or assortment."

== History ==
=== Seventeenth century ===
Late in the seventeenth century, the name salmagundi was applied to the grand salads of large houses. These compound salads descended from medieval herb and flower salads. Raw salads, according to food historian C. Anne Wilson, 'had never come under the same sort of disapproval as fresh fruit, partly because so many salad plants were thought to have medicinal properties. Moreover, in a skilfully mixed salad, aromatic herbs noted for their warm, dry qualities, could counteract the coldness of other kinds, such as lettuce, purslane or endive'. During the reign of Elizabeth I fruits and vegetables and hard-boiled eggs were added to them.

=== Eighteenth-century recipes ===
An early recipe for salmagundi comes from A Collection of Above Three Hundred Receipts in Cookery, Physick, and Surgery: For the Use of All Good Wives, Tender Mothers, and Careful Nurses by Mary Kettiby (1734):

To make a Cold Hash, or Salad-Magundy. TAKE a cold Turkey, two cold Chickens, or, if you have neither, a piece of fine white Veal will do; cut the Breasts of these Fowls into fair dices, and Mince all the rest; to the Quantity of two Chickens you must take eight or ten large Anchovies, wash and bone them, eight large pickled Oysters, ten or twelve fine green pickled Cucumbers, shred the Oysters, the Anchovies, the Cucumbers, and one whole Lemon small, mix them with the shred Meat, lay it in the middle of the Dish, lay the Dices of the white part round the Dish, with halv'd Anchovies, whole pickled Oysters, quarter'd Cucumbers, sliced Lemon, whole pickled Mushrooms, Capers or any Pickle you like; cut also some fine Lettice, and lay round among the Garnish, but put not Oil and Vinegar to the Minced Meat, till it comes to Table.

A later recipe for salmagundi from The Lady's Assistant for Regulating and Supplying Her Table by Charlotte Mason (1777) includes roasted chicken or roasted veal, boiled eggs, parsley, a herring, anchovies, beetroot and red cabbage. A saucer or china basin is placed in the middle of a dish and the ingredients are laid in rows, 'according to taste', the rows get narrower towards the top of the bowl. At the top butter."

== Quote ==
Salmagundi is more of a concept than a recipe. Essentially, it is a large composed salad that incorporates meat, seafood, cooked vegetables, raw vegetables, fruits, and nuts and is arranged in an elaborate way. Think of it as the British answer to Salad Niçoise.—

== See also ==
- List of salads
- Salmagundi Club
- Colgate University, which uses Salmagundi as the title of the annual student yearbook
- Solomon Gundy, a spicy Caribbean paste made of mashed, pickled herrings, peppers and onions. In Jamaica, the term refers more specifically to a dish made of salt herring and spices.

== Sources ==
- Richard Mabey, Food for Free – A guide to the edible wild plants of Britain. 1972.
