= Bremer Klaben =

German type of dried fruit filled bread

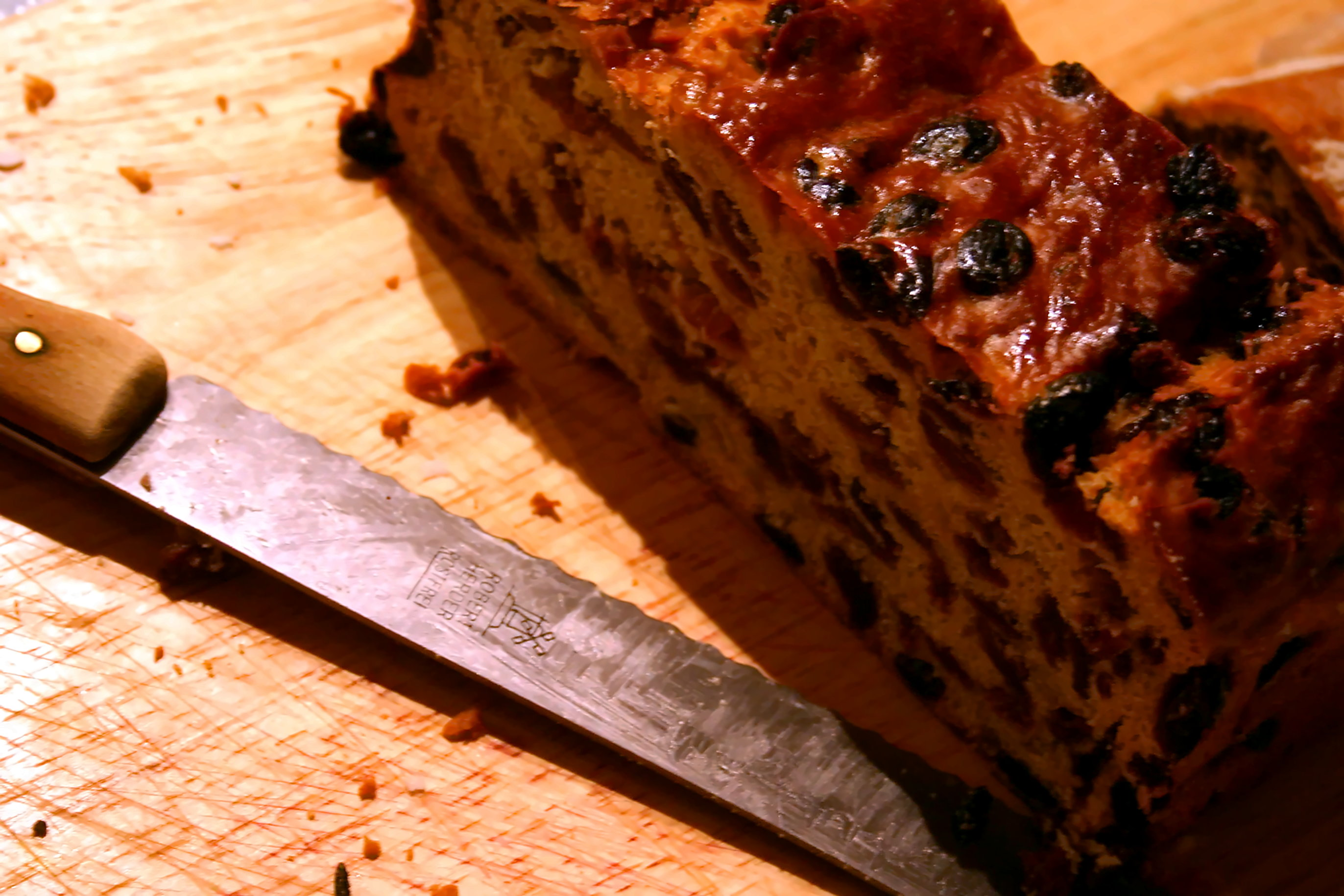
- Alternative names: Klaben
- Type: Stollen
- Place of origin: Germany
- Region or state: Bremen
- Main ingredients: Flour, butter, sugar, dried fruit (especially raisins), orange and lemon peel, rum, almonds, yeast

Bremer Klaben, or just Klaben, is a type of Stollen from Bremen, Germany. This celebrated bread, famous in Northern Germany, is traditionally eaten during the Christmas season. It is said that Bremer Klaben tastes especially good when it is baked two weeks before serving. It has a shelf life of several months.

== Appearance ==
This pastry has more raisins than an ordinary fruit cake. It is a bread of sorts made with dried fruit (especially raisins), flour, butter, sugar, orange and lemon peel, rum, almonds, yeast and salt, though many variations exist. A feature that distinguishes it from Stollen is that it is not dusted with powdered sugar after baking. The recipe is closely associated with the traditional Stecker cake shop which was founded in 1742.

== History ==
The earliest known document mentioning Klaben is from 1593.

Since December 2009 it has held a protected designation of origin. The bread-shaped cake joined the select ranks of food that enjoy protected geographical indications under EU law, such as Aachener Printen gingerbread and lebkuchen from Nuremberg. The Commission Regulation of the European Union released the announcement through its Official Journal.
