= Stollen =

Christmas bread

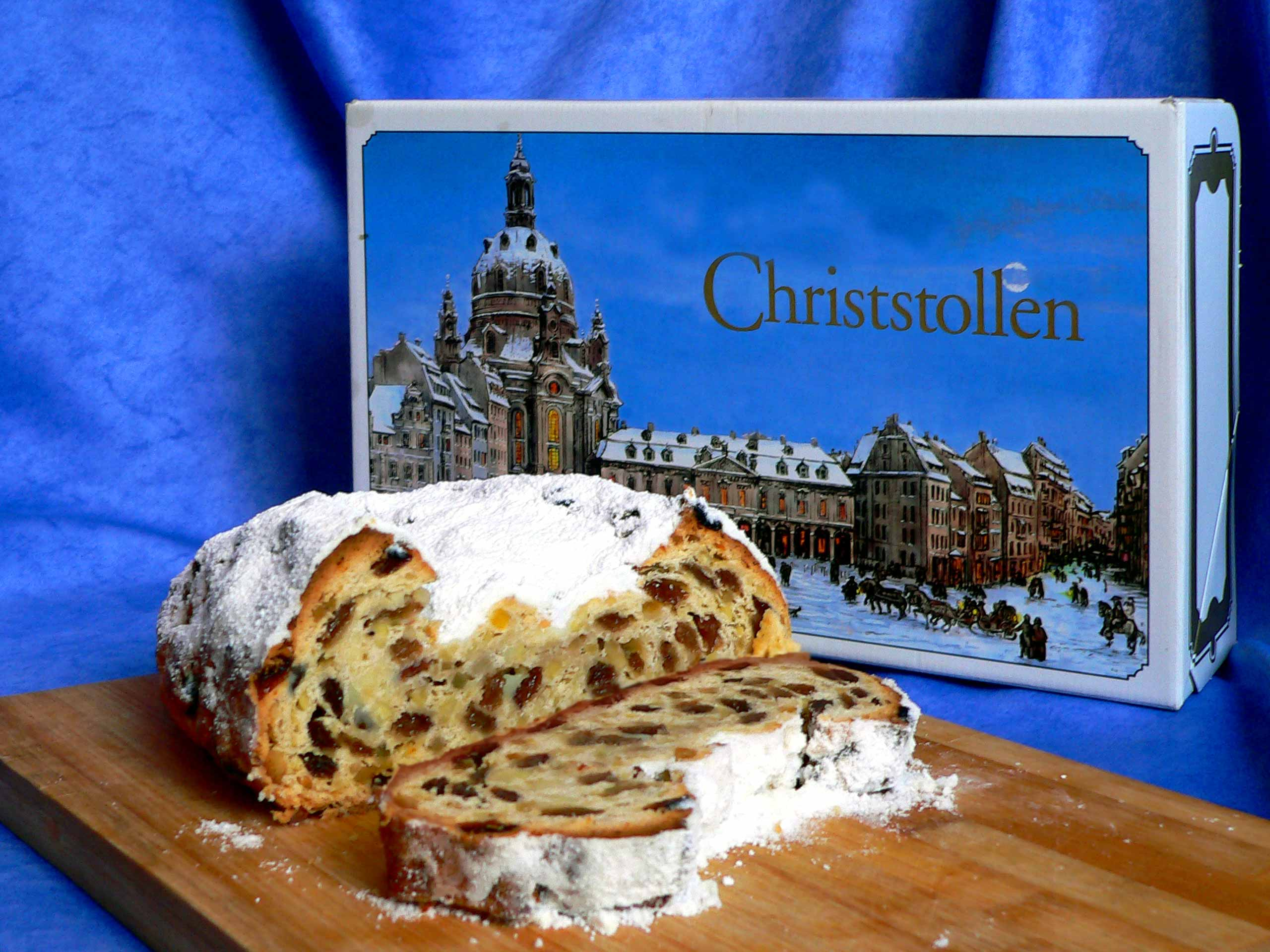
- A Christmas stollen from Dresden
- Alternative names: Dutch: Stol, kerststol, or paasstol
- Type: Fruit bread
- Place of origin: Germany
- Main ingredients: Yeast dough, Candied fruit or dried fruit, nuts, spices (cardamom and cinnamon); sugar, powdered sugar or icing sugar

Stollen (German: [ˈʃtɔlən] or German: [ʃtɔln]) or stol (Dutch: [stɔl]) is a fruit bread of nuts, spices, and dried or candied fruit, often coated with powdered sugar or icing sugar and often containing marzipan or almond paste. It is a traditional holiday sweet bread in Northwestern Europe, particularly in Germany and the Netherlands. The bread is also popular in Suriname.

In Germany during the Christmas season the cake-like loaves are called Weihnachtsstollen (lit. 'Christmas stollen') or Christstollen (lit. 'Christ stollen'). A ring-shaped Stollen made in a Bundt cake or Gugelhupf pan is called a Stollenkranz (lit. 'stollen wreath'). In the Netherlands the bread is called kerststol (lit. 'Christmas stol') when eaten around Christmas, and paasstol (lit. 'Easter stol') when eaten around Easter.

In Germany, stollen are produced year-round, but are traditionally eaten during Advent or Christmas. In the Netherlands, a full-size stollen is typically only available in the Christmas and Easter seasons, but miniature stollen are sold year-round as a pastry snack.

== Ingredients ==
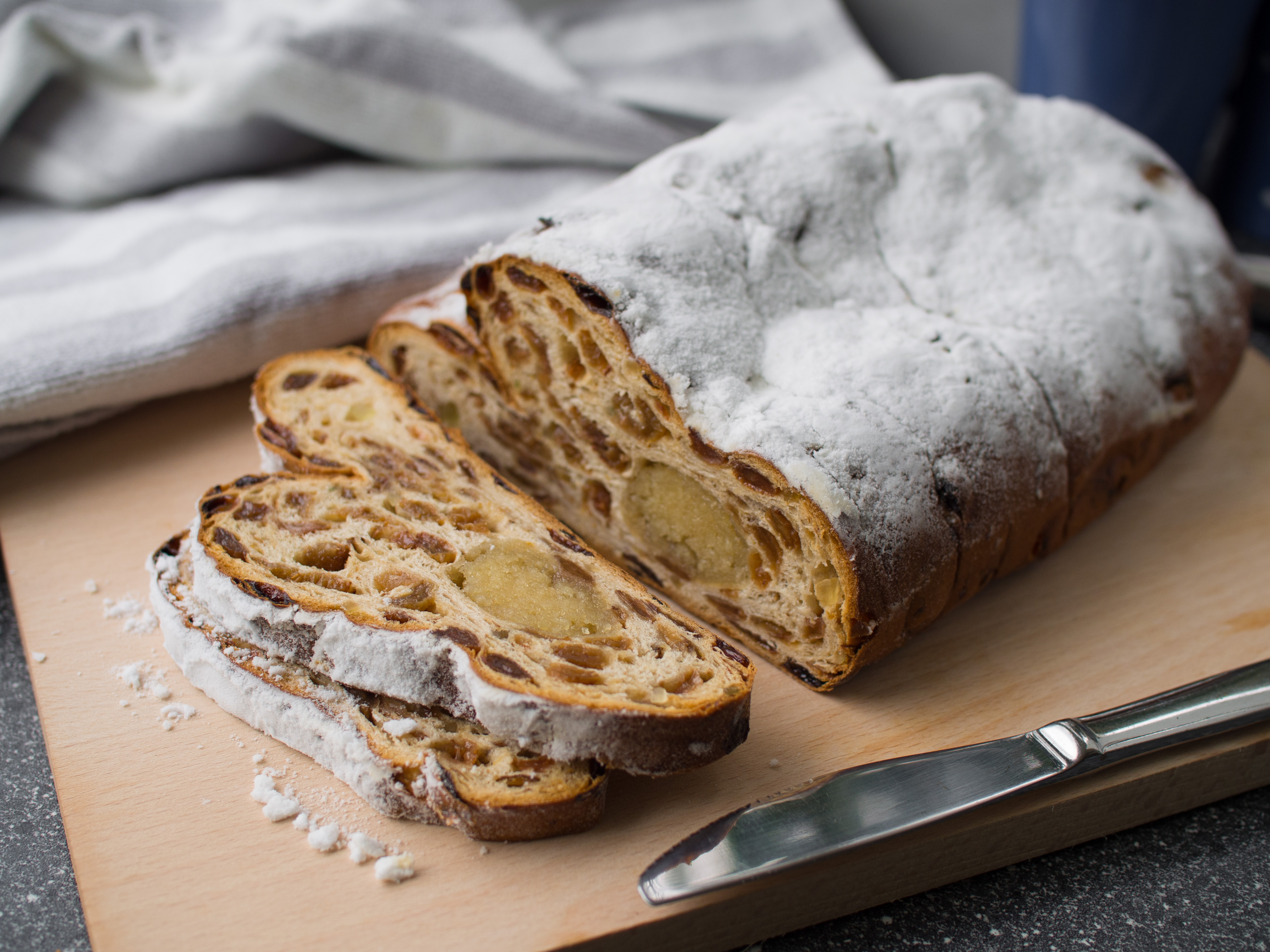
Dutch kerststol with almond paste in the middle

Stollen is a cake-like fruit bread made with yeast, water and flour, and usually with zest added to the dough Orangeat (candied orange peel) and candied citrus peel (Zitronat), raisins and almonds, and various spices such as cardamom and cinnamon are added. Other ingredients, such as milk, sugar, butter, salt, rum, eggs, vanilla, other dried fruits and nuts and marzipan, may also be added to the dough. Except for the fruit added, the dough is quite low in sugar. The finished bread is sprinkled with icing sugar. The traditional weight of a stollen is around 2 kg (4.4 lb), but smaller sizes are common. The bread is slathered with melted unsalted butter and rolled in sugar as soon as it comes out of the oven, resulting in a moister product that keeps better. The marzipan rope in the middle is optional. The dried fruits are macerated in rum or brandy for a superior-tasting bread.

Dresden stollen (originally Striezel), a moist, heavy bread filled with fruit, was first mentioned in an official document in 1474, and Dresdner stollen remains notable and available – amongst other places – at the Dresden Christmas market, the Striezelmarkt. Dresden stollen is produced in the city of Dresden and distinguished by a special seal depicting King Augustus II the Strong. This "official" stollen is produced in only 110 Dresden bakeries.

A Dutch stollen is a white bread with raisins or currants and, unlike in Germany, it always contains almond paste. Many also contain nuts, and have almond shavings and/or powdered sugar on top. In supermarkets nowadays, the difference between a Christmas stollen and an Easter stollen is negligible, but traditionally only a Christmas stollen is topped with powdered sugar, while an Easter stollen contains candied orange peel and more commonly has various other ingredients, such as candied citron peel and both raisins and currants. The yeast-based bread often contains dried fruits, raisins and currants, lemon and orange zest, water, milk, butter, sugar, vanilla and cinnamon. A more luxurious variety may include chopped walnuts, almonds, or hazelnuts. Ginger powder or grated crystallized ginger, dried cherries and cranberries, apple, kiwi or cardamom may also be added to this pastry dough.

== History ==
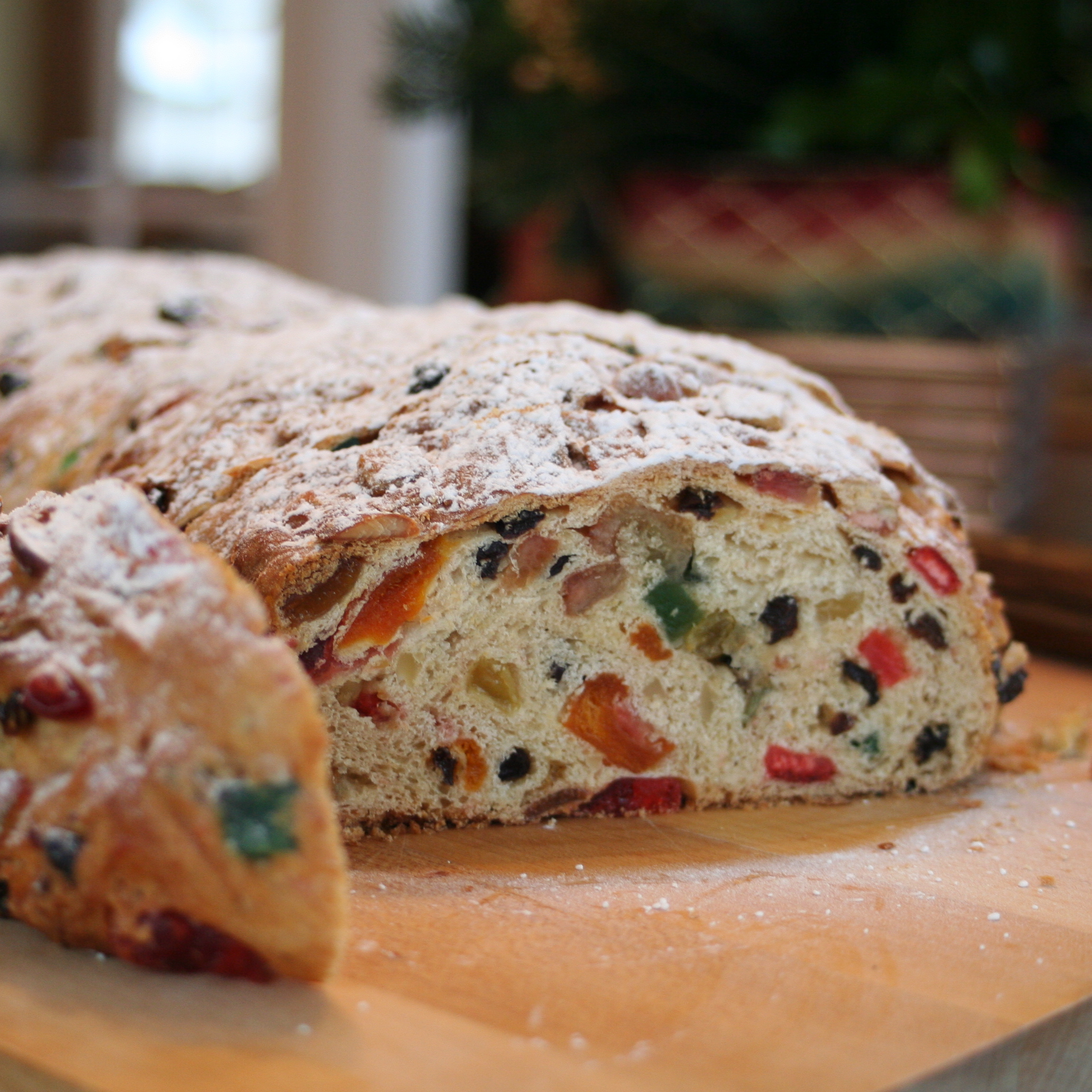
Stollen with candied fruits and without marzipan

Early stollen was different from the modern version, with the ingredients being flour, oats and water. As a Christmas bread, stollen was baked for the first time at the Saxon Royal Court in 1427, and was made with flour, yeast, oil and water.

The Advent season was a time of fasting, and bakers were not allowed to use butter, only oil, and the cake was tasteless and hard. In the 15th century, in medieval Saxony (in central Germany, north of Bavaria and south of Brandenburg), the Prince Elector Ernst (1441–1486) and his brother Duke Albrecht (1443–1500) decided to remedy this by writing to the Pope in Rome. The Saxon bakers needed to use butter, as oil in Saxony was expensive, hard to come by, and had to be made from turnips.

Pope Nicholas V (1397–1455), in 1450 denied the first appeal. Five popes died before finally, in 1490, Pope Innocent VIII (1432–1492) sent a letter, known as the "Butter-Letter", to the prince's successor. This granted the use of butter (without having to pay a fine), but only for the Prince-Elector and his family and household.

Others were also permitted to use butter, but on the condition of having to pay annually 1/20 of a gold coin Gulden to support the building of the Freiberg Minster. The papal restriction on the use of butter was removed when Saxony became Protestant.

Over the centuries, the bread changed from being a simple, fairly tasteless "bread" to a sweeter bread with richer ingredients, such as marzipan, although traditional stollen is not as sweet, light, and airy as the copies made around the world.

In East Germany, Dresden stollen were sent to West Germany as a way of thanking the citizens of West Germany for sending care packets (Westpaket), as they were both available to East German citizens and of a high enough standard to be appreciated as gifts.

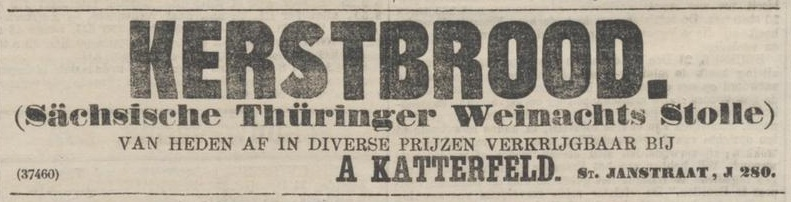
1870 advertisement for "Kerstbrood (Sächsische Thüringer Weihnachts Stolle)" (lit. 'Christmas bread (Saxon-Thuringian Christmas stollen)') in an Amsterdam newspaper

Stollen is said to have been first popularized in the Netherlands by a German baker in Amsterdam in the 19th century. He placed an advertisement in an Amsterdam newspaper of 23 December 1870, and continued placing advertisements in subsequent years.

Commercially made stollen has become a popular Christmas food in Britain in recent decades, complementing traditional dishes such as mince pies and Christmas pudding. All the major supermarkets sell their own versions, many made in Germany, and it is often baked by home bakers.

== Dresden stollen festival ==
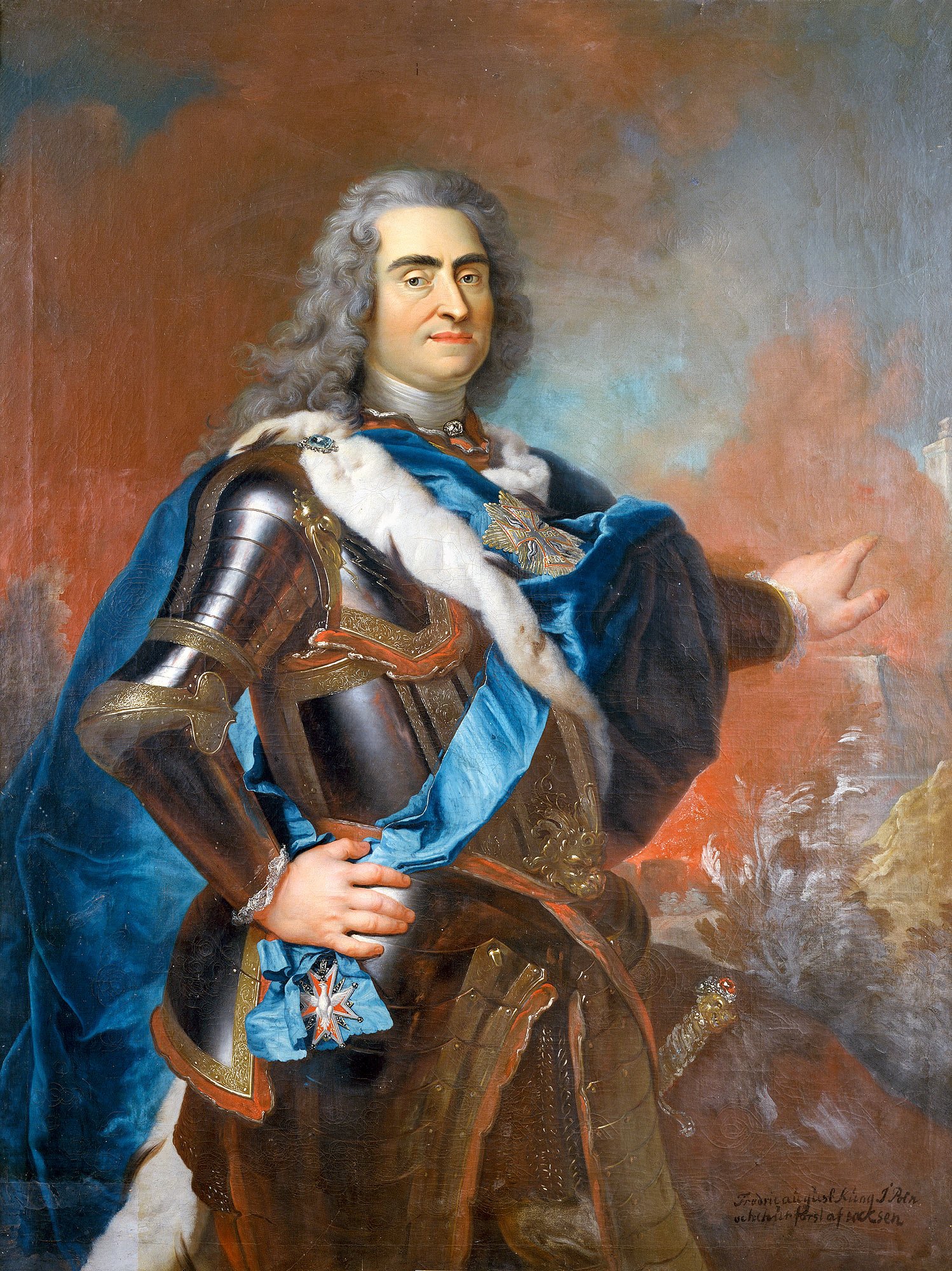
Augustus II the Strong, by Louis de Silvestre

Every year the Stollenfest takes place in Dresden. This historic tradition ended only in 1918 with the fall of the monarchy, and started again in 1994, but the idea comes from Dresden's history.

Dresden's Christmas market, the Striezelmarkt, was mentioned in the chronicles for the first time in 1474.

The tradition of baking Christmas stollen in Dresden is very old. Christmas stollen in Dresden was already baked in the 15th century.

In 1560, the bakers of Dresden offered the rulers of Saxony Christmas stollen weighing 36 pounds (16 kg) each as gifts, and the custom continued.

Augustus II the Strong (1670–1733) was the Elector of Saxony, King of Poland and the Grand Duke of Lithuania. The king loved pomp, luxury, splendour and feasts. In 1730, he impressed his subjects, ordering the Bakers' Guild of Dresden to make a giant 1.7-tonne stollen, big enough for everyone to have a portion to eat. There were around 24,000 guests taking part in the festivities on the occasion of the legendary amusement festivity known as Zeithainer Lustlager. For this special occasion, the court architect Matthäus Daniel Pöppelmann (1662–1737), built a particularly oversized stollen oven. An oversized stollen knife was also designed solely for this occasion.

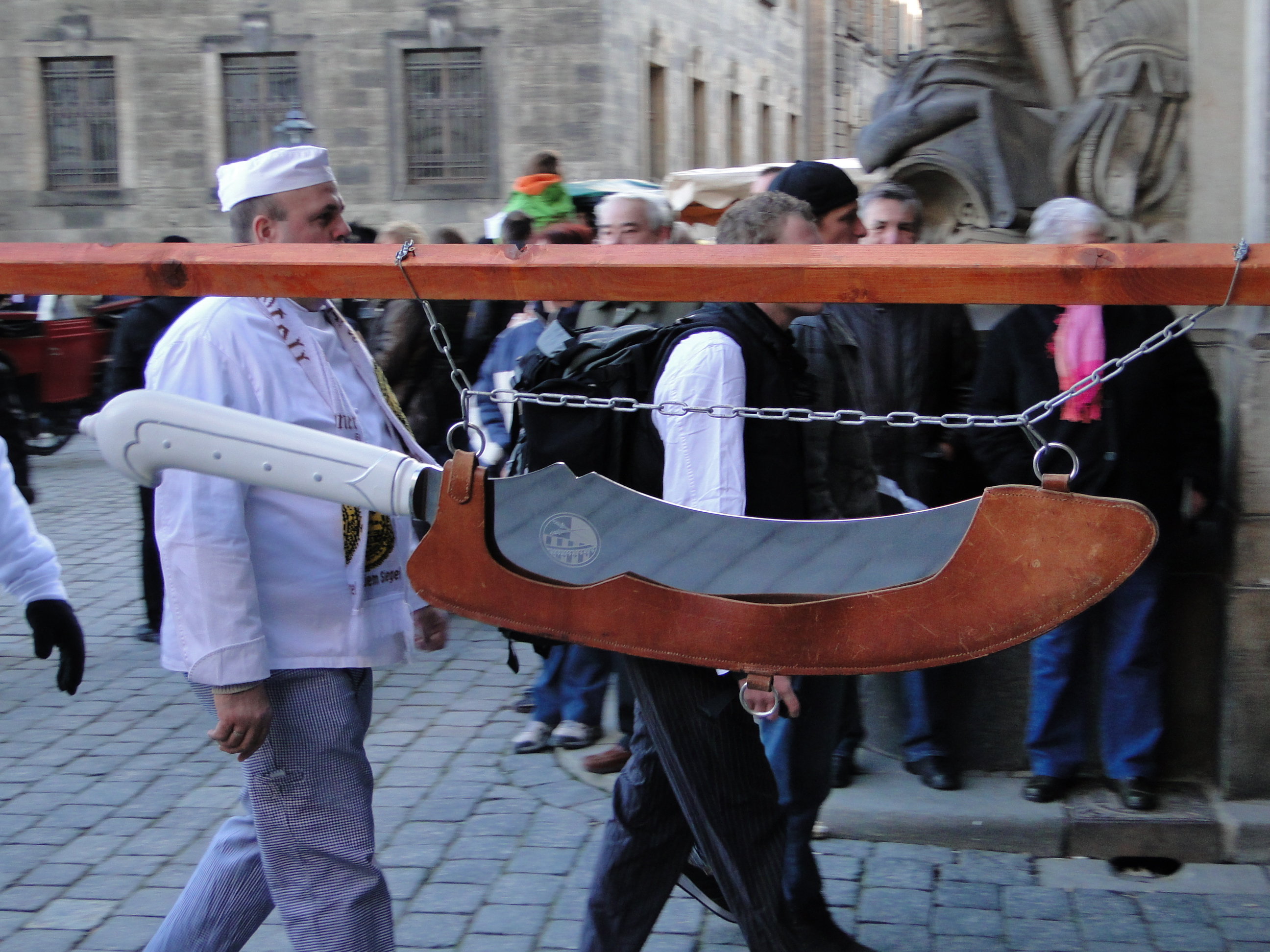
The Grand Dresden Stollen Knife

Today, the festival takes place on the Saturday before the second Sunday in Advent, and the cake weighs between three and four tonnes. A carriage takes the cake in a parade through the streets of Dresden to the Christmas market, where it is ceremoniously cut into pieces and distributed among the crowd, in return for a small payment which goes to charity. A special knife, the Grand Dresden Stollen Knife, a silver-plated knife, 1.60 metres (5.2 ft) long weighing 12 kilograms (26 lb), which is a copy of the lost baroque original knife from 1730, is used to cut the oversize stollen at the Dresden Christmas fair.

The largest stollen was baked in 2010 by Lidl; it was 72.1 metres (237 ft) long and was certified by the Guinness Book of World Records, at the railway station of Haarlem.

== Surinamese stol ==
Suriname was a colony of the Netherlands from 1667 until 1954. Surinamese stol is lighter and sweeter than traditional Dutch and German stol. The dish is very popular in Suriname and is eaten in large quantities around Christmas and Easter.

== Gallery ==
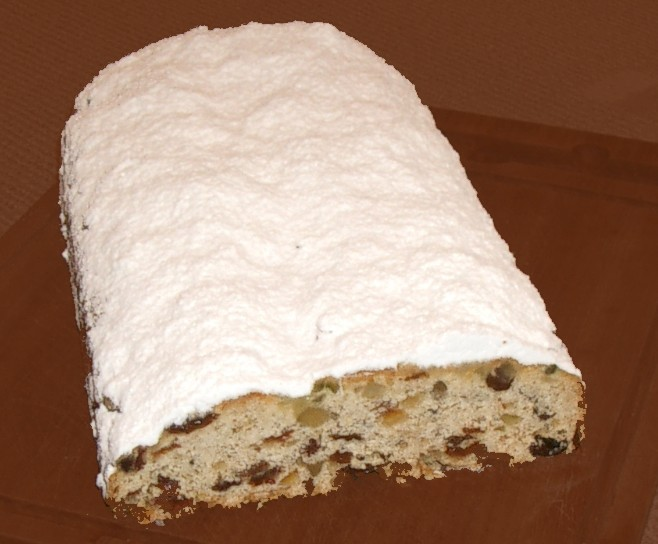
Christmas stollen with raisins

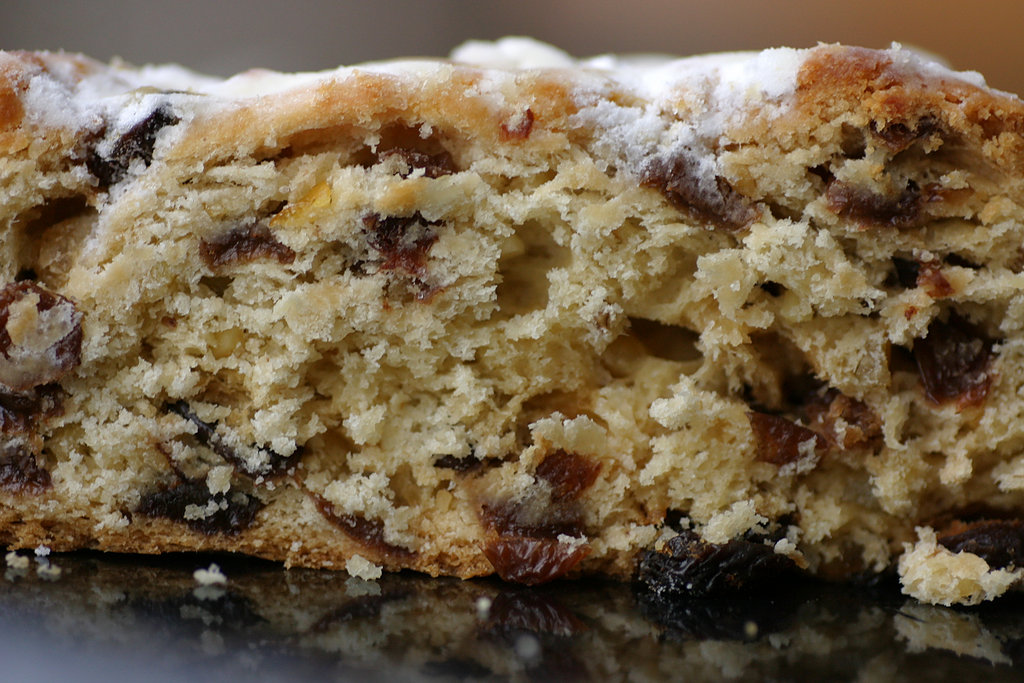
A stollen, close up detail

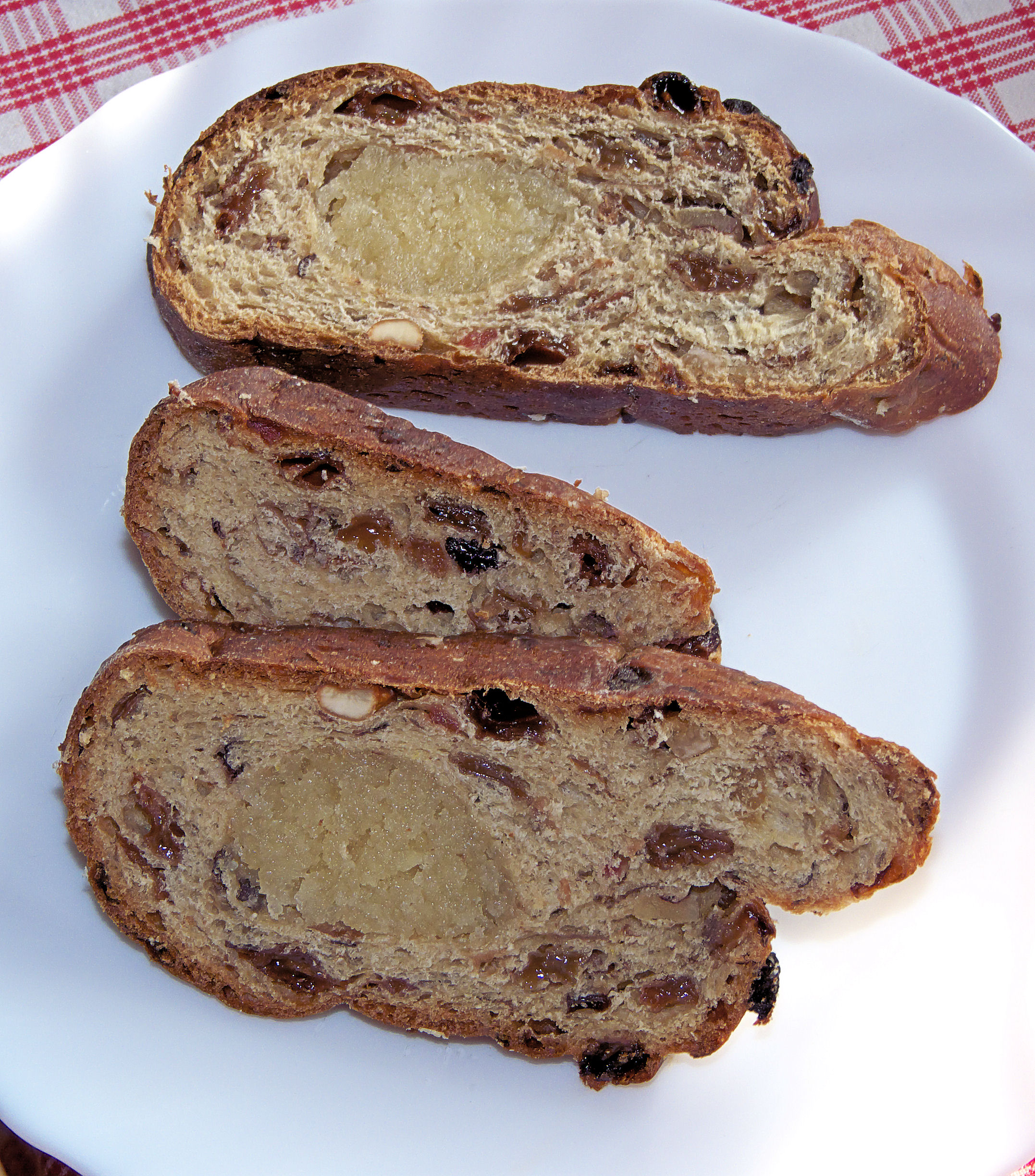
Dutch kerststol slices with almond paste filling

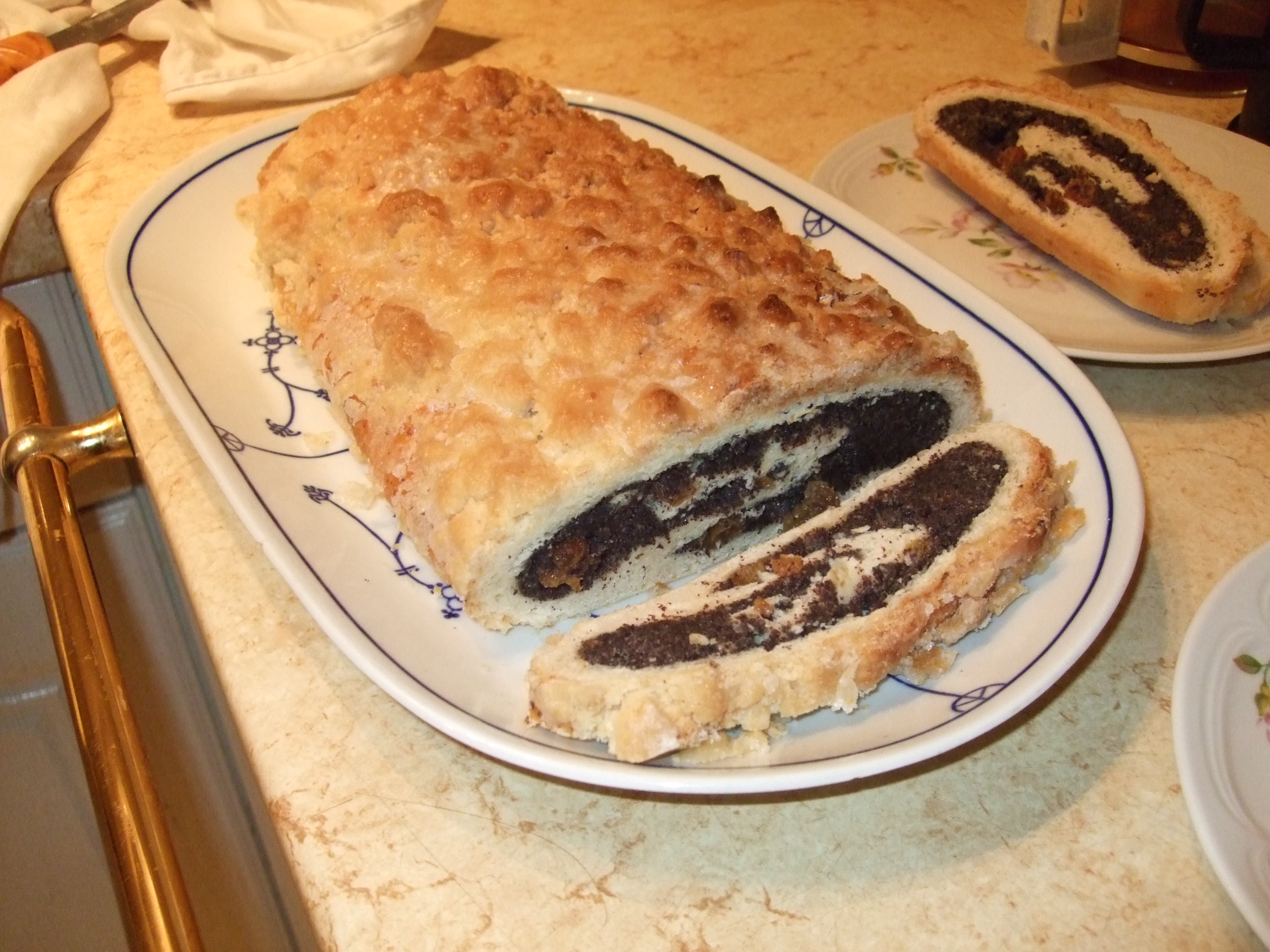
Stollen made with poppy seed paste

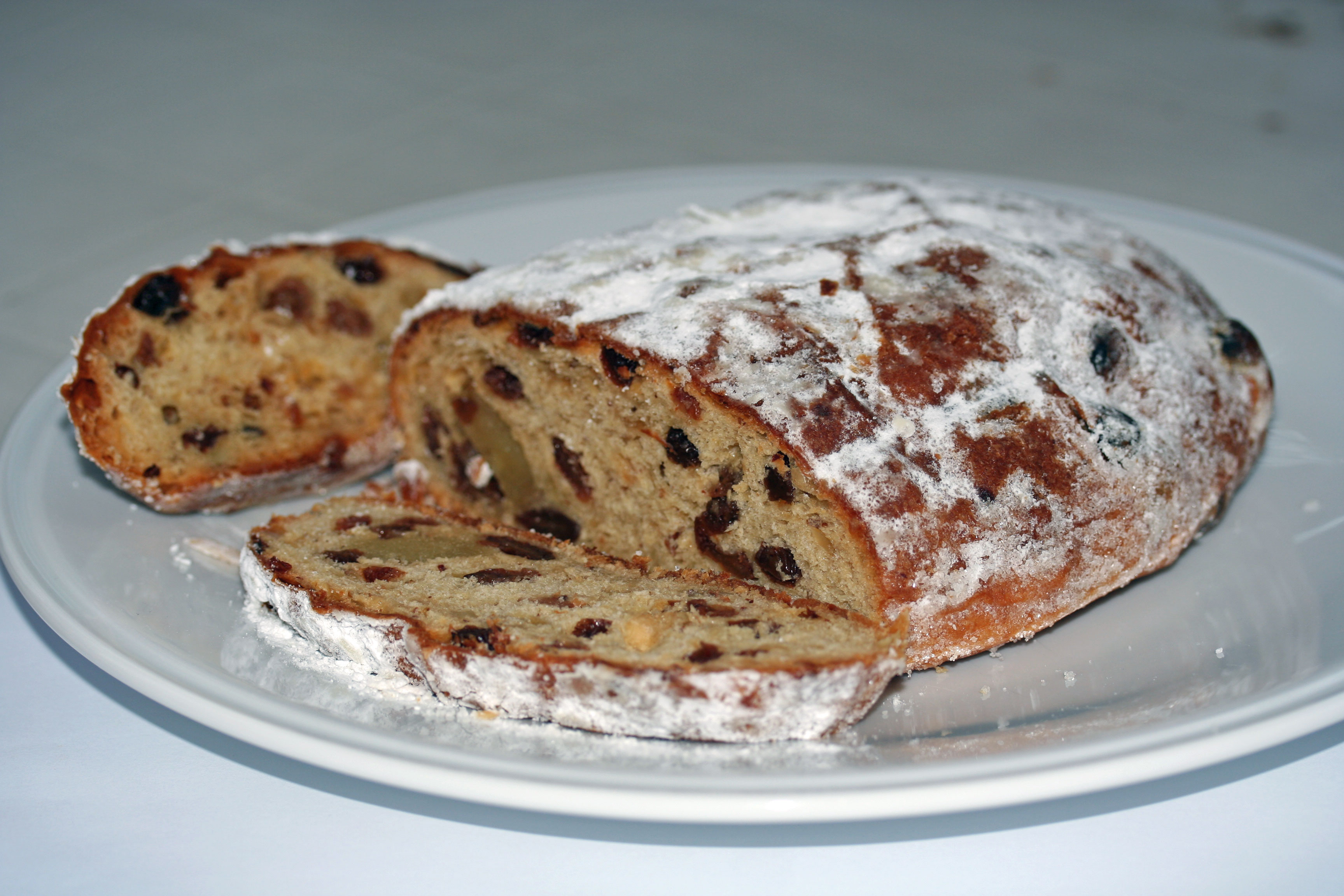
Sliced stollen on a plate

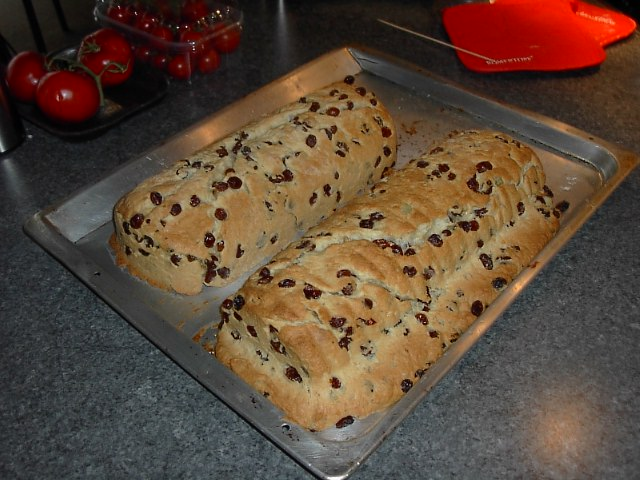
Loaves of stollen

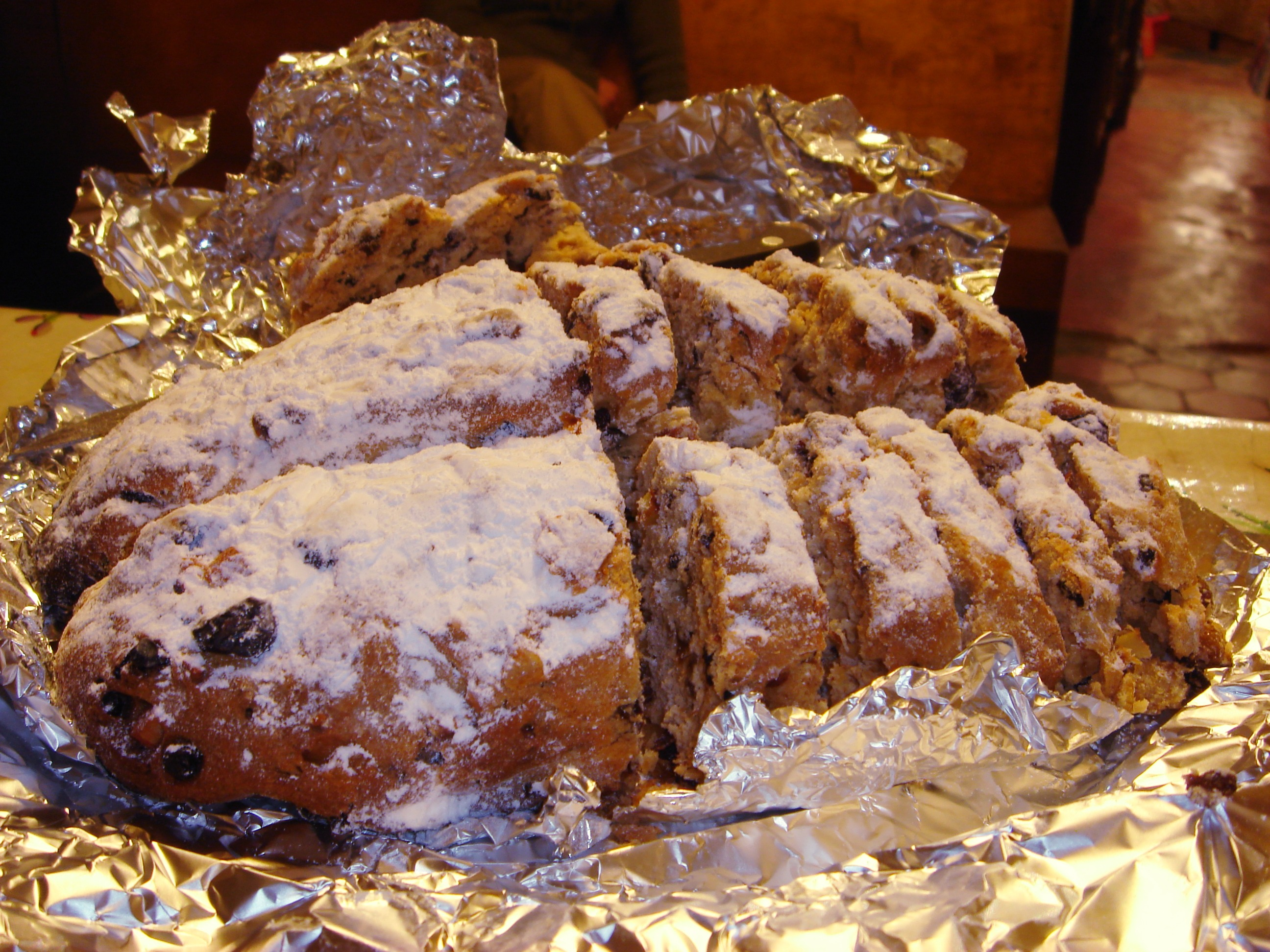
Stollen

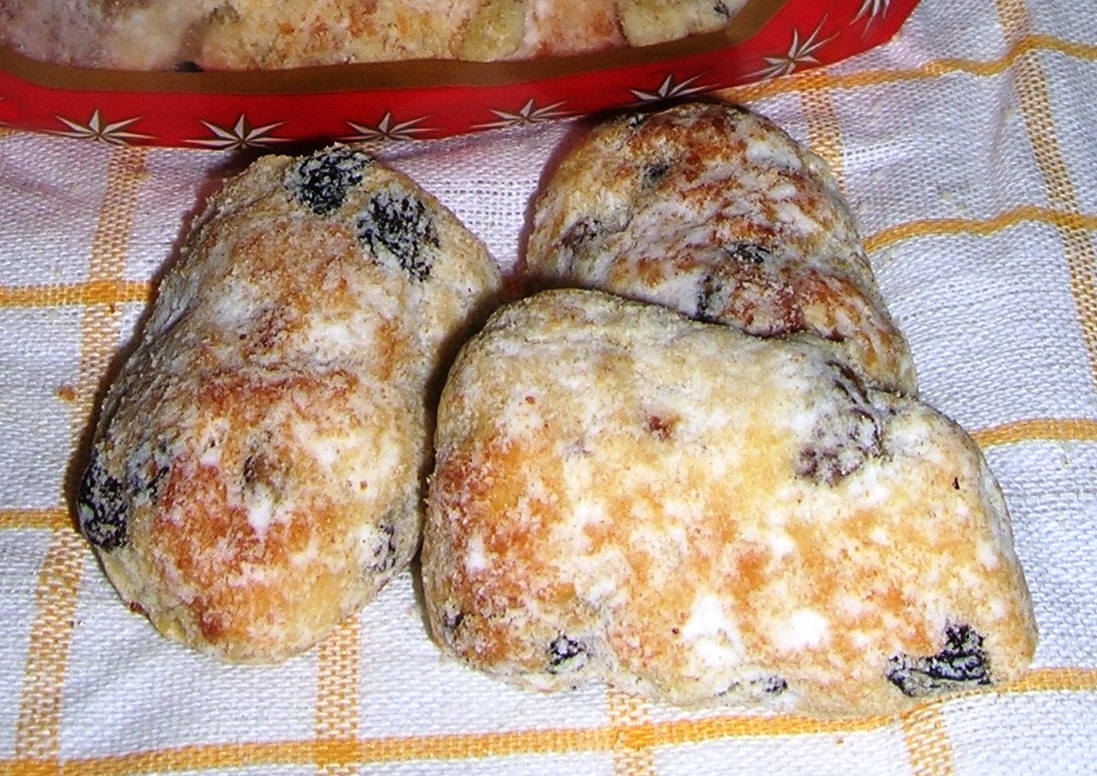
Mini Marzipan Stollen

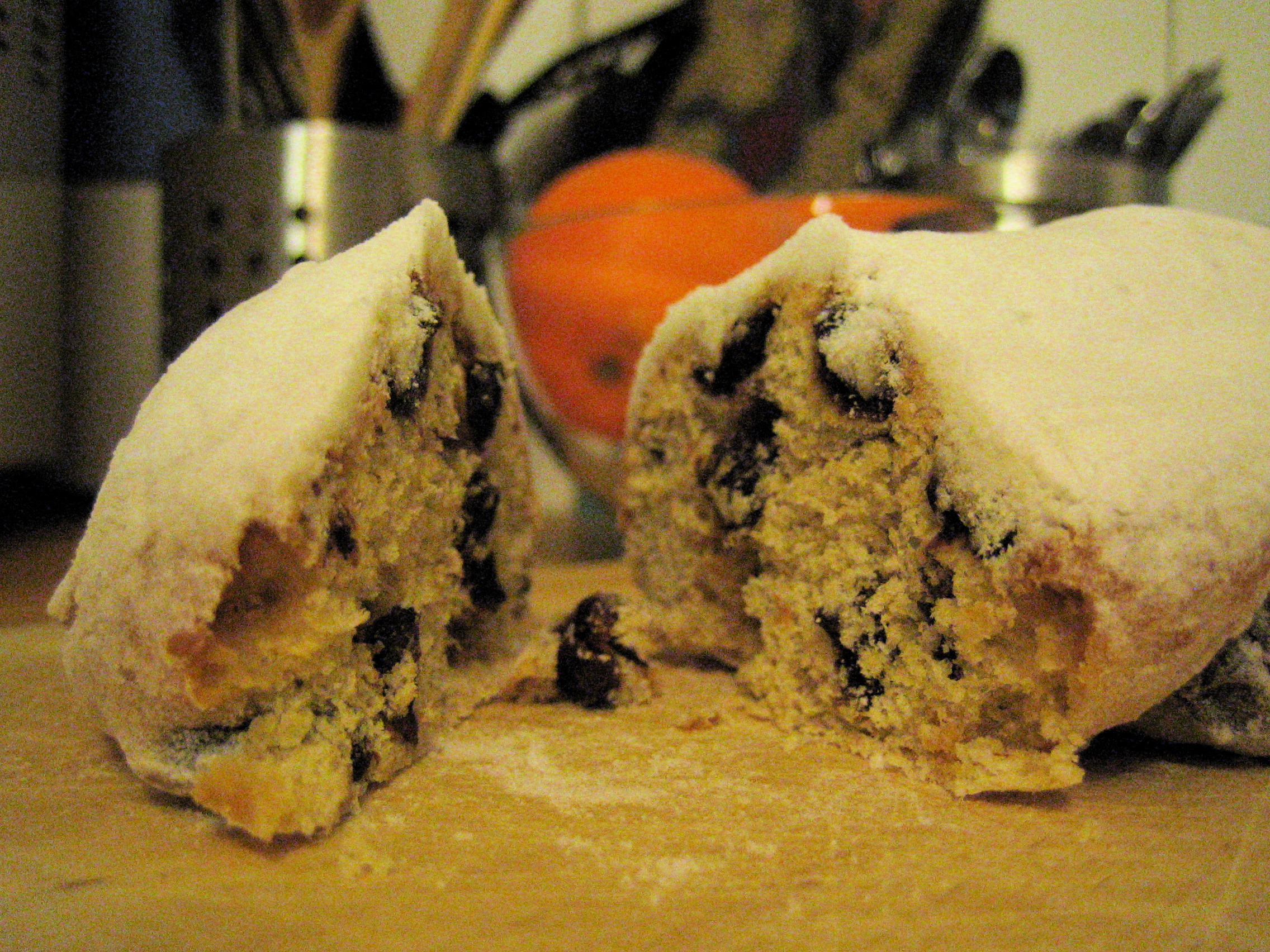
Cut stollen on wooden board

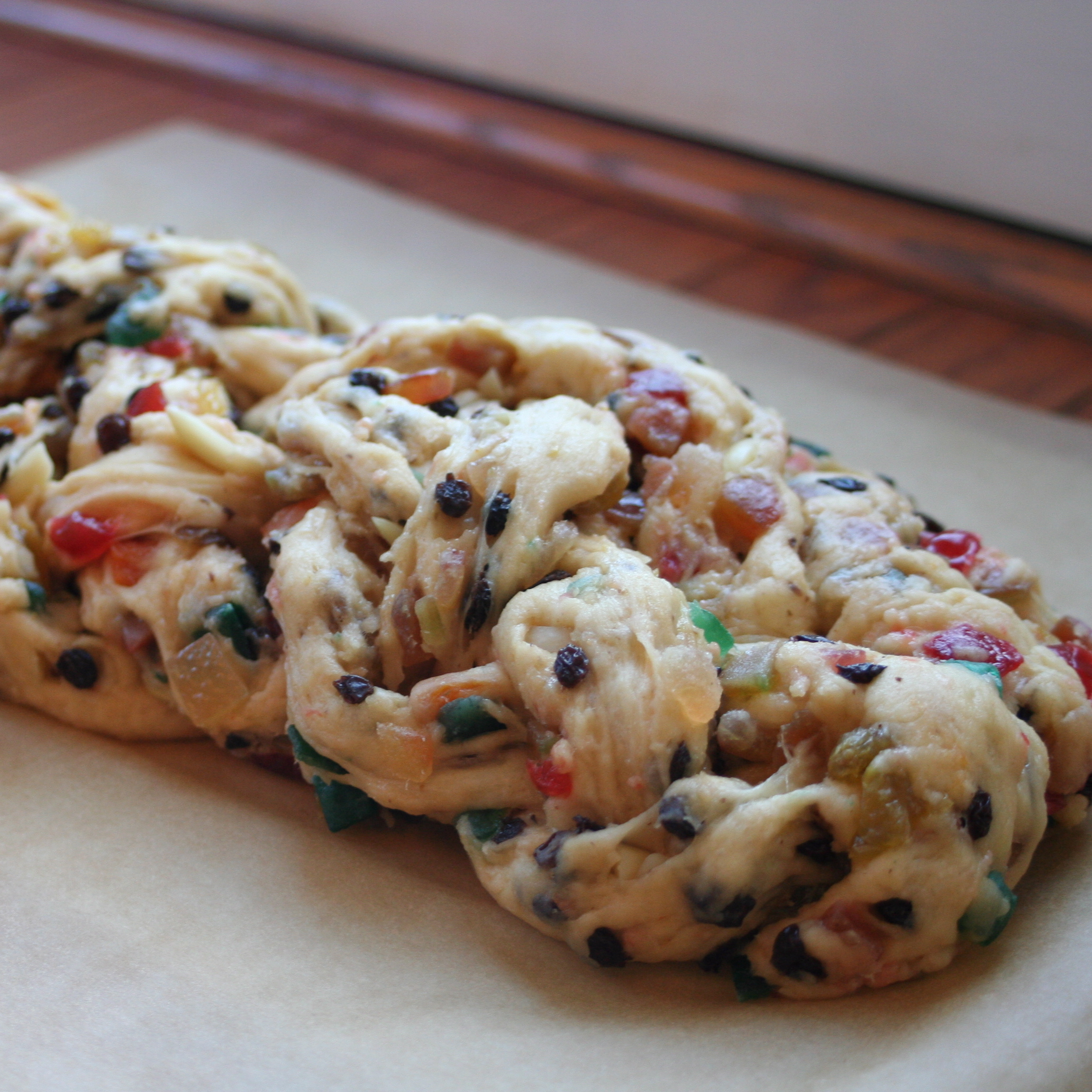
Plaited stollen (Strietzel) with candied fruits and nuts (before baking)

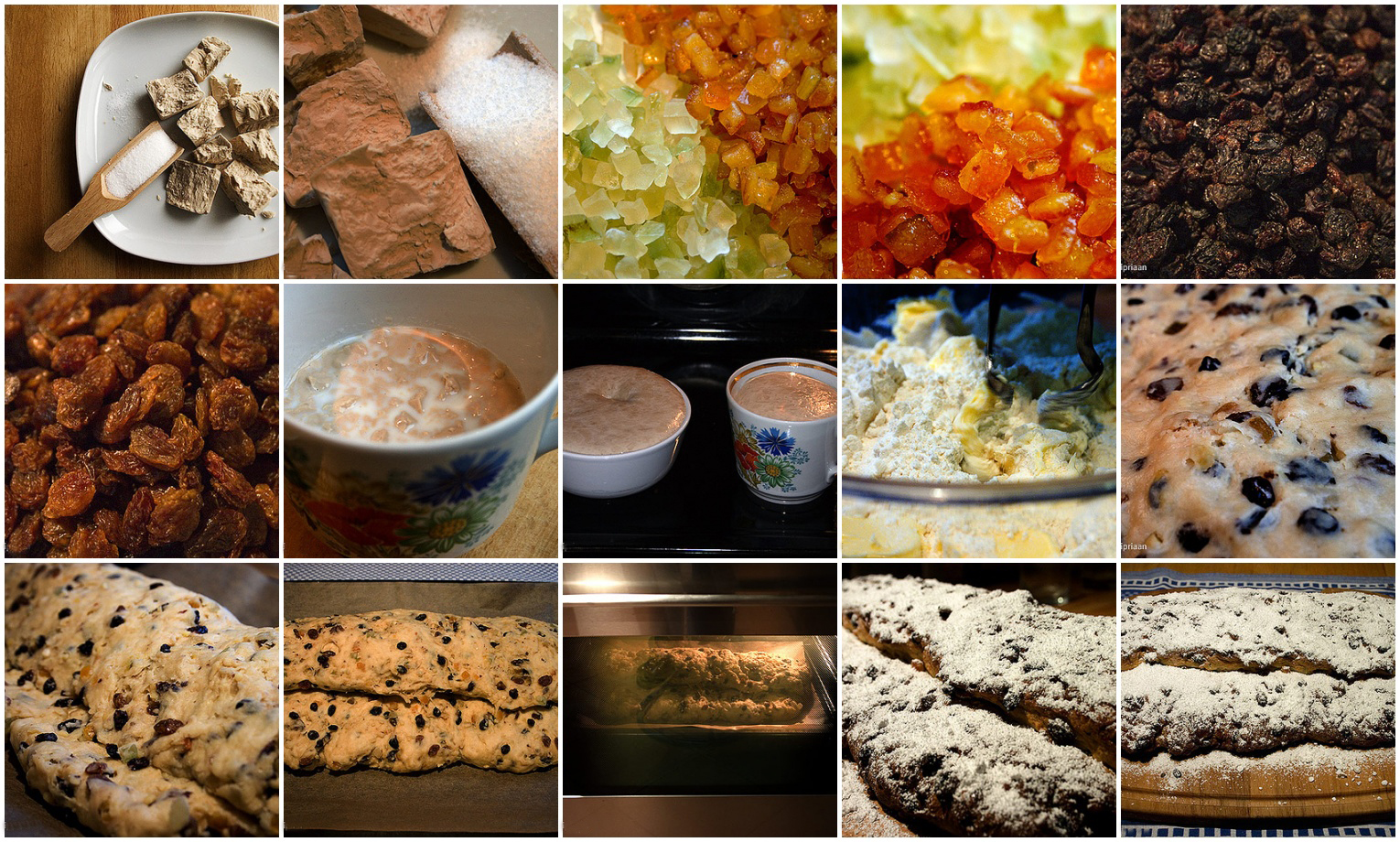
Making stollen

== See also ==
- Bremer Klaben
- Christkindlmarkt
- Christmas pudding
- Christmas worldwide
- Cuisine of Germany
- Dutch cuisine
