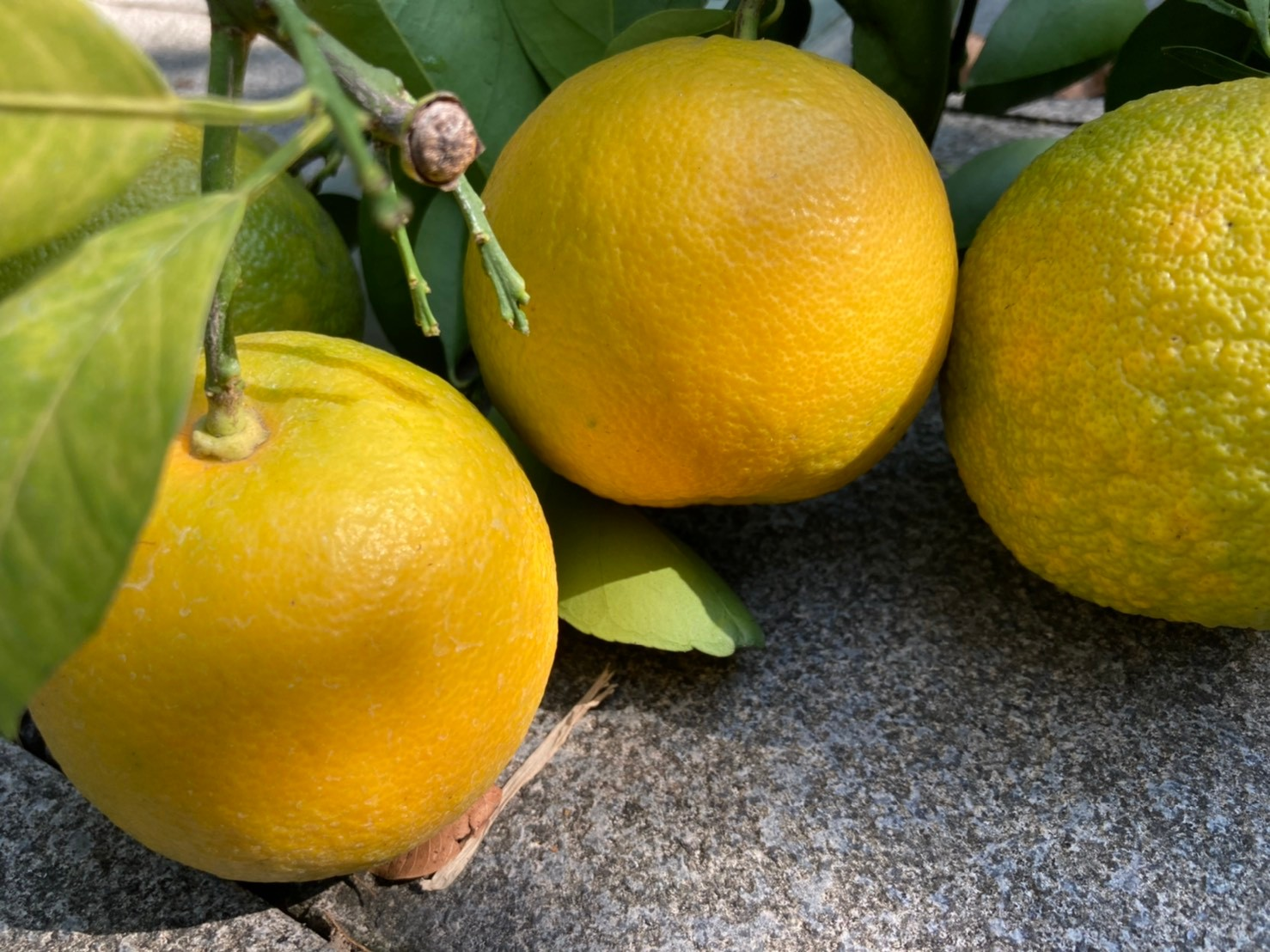

Conservation status
- Critically Endangered (IUCN 2.3)

Scientific classification
- Kingdom: Plantae
- Clade: Embryophytes
- Clade: Tracheophytes
- Clade: Spermatophytes
- Clade: Angiosperms
- Clade: Eudicots
- Clade: Rosids
- Order: Sapindales
- Family: Rutaceae
- Genus: Citrus
- Species: C. × taiwanica

Binomial name
- Citrus × taiwanica Yu.Tanaka & Shimada

= Citrus taiwanica =

Species of plant

Citrus taiwanica is a citrus species from Taiwan. It is critically endangered in the wild.

== Name ==
In the Saisiyat language it is called Katayoe'. The Japanese named it the Nansho Daidai sour orange when they colonized Taiwan.

== Distribution ==
Cultivated varieties are primarily found in Nanzhuang Township. Additionally they have been planted as part of reforestation efforts by the Forestry and Nature Conservation Agency.

It is critically endangered in the wild according to The IUCN Red List of Threatened Species since 1998.

== Description ==
Citrus taiwanica is a small tree with numerous thorns. The fruit are yellow when ripe and remain bitter.

In Riverside, California it ripens from January to March.

Citrus taiwanica has significant genetic differences from the main group of sour oranges.

== Uses ==
Marmalade can be made from Citrus taiwanica. Marmalade made from Citrus taiwanica has twice won awards at the World Marmalade Awards.

== See also ==
- Sour orange
