= Marmalade =

Preserve made from citrus fruits

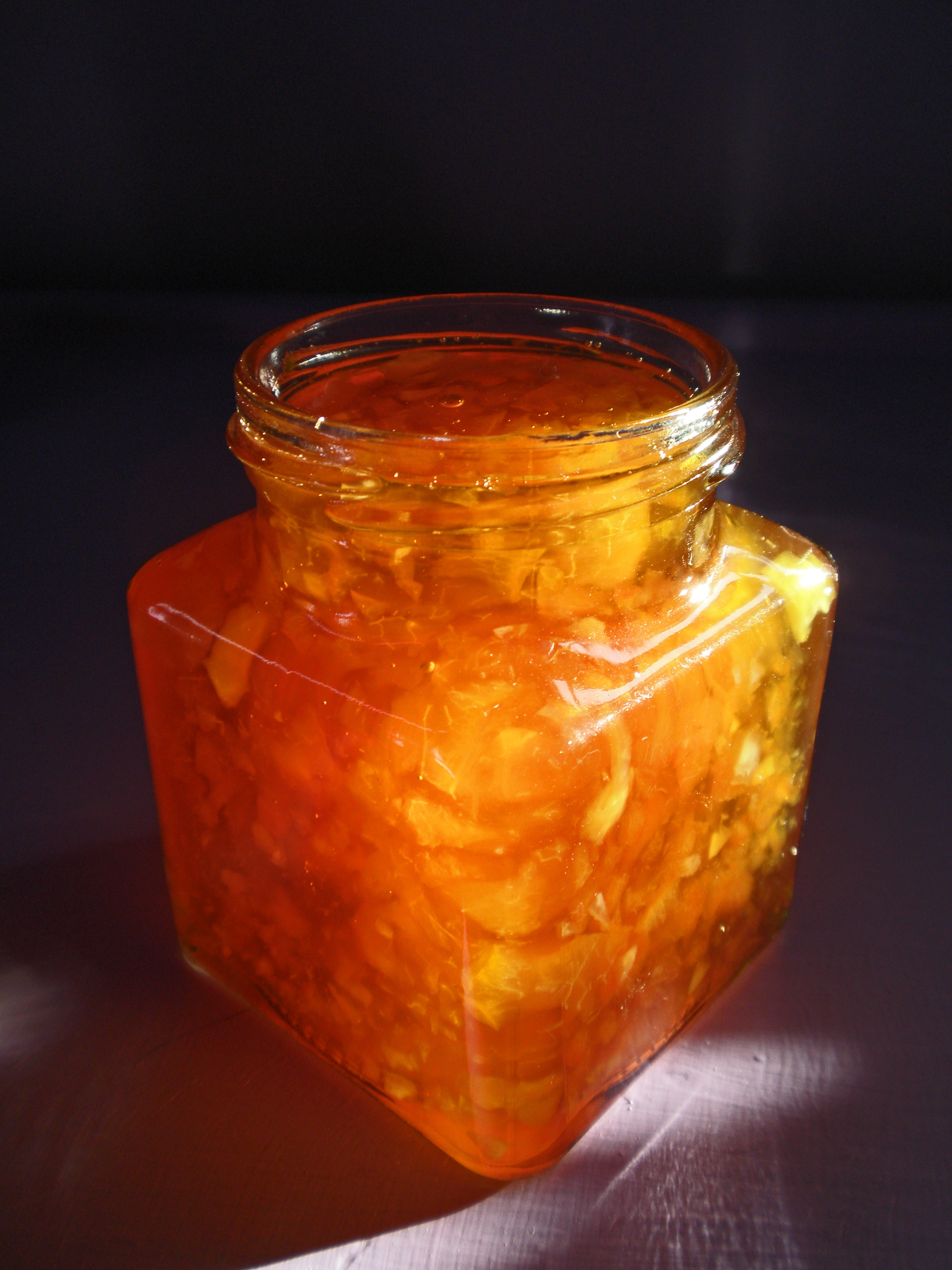
- A jar of homemade marmalade
- Type: Fruit preserve
- Place of origin: United Kingdom
- Region or state: Europe
- Serving temperature: Room temperature or slightly less
- Main ingredients: Juice and peel of citrus fruits, sugar, and water
- Food energy (per 100 g serving): 246 kcal (1,030 kJ)
Nutritional value
(per 100 g serving)
- Protein: 0.3 g
- Fat: 0 g
- Carbohydrate: 66.3 g
- Similar dishes: Jam

Marmalade is a sweet, tangy fruit preserve made from the juice and peel of citrus fruits boiled with sugar and water. The well-known version is made from bitter orange, but other citrus fruits such as lemons and limes can also be used. Bitter orange is mostly used in marmalade because of its high pectin content, which gives a thick consistency to its marmalade. Bitter oranges also have the proper balance of acid and pectin to create the right consistency. To make marmalade from fruit with less pectin, pectin must be added.

Historically, the term marmalade was often used for non-citrus preserves. Mango, pineapple, apricot, and cocoa beans have all been made into marmalade. In the 21st century, the term refers mainly to jam made with citrus fruits. White sugar (sucrose) is typically used to sweeten marmalade. Sugar substitutes such as sucralose, aspartame, or saccharin may be used. Artificial dyes and flavouring agents may be added to marmalade to enhance taste, flavour, and appearance.

Originally marmalade was made from quince, essentially creating the thick quince cheese. Mary Kettilby's 1714 cookery book, A Collection of above Three Hundred Receipts (pages 78–79) discusses how to make marmalade. Modern marmalade was created in the 1700s when the Scots added water to make it less solid. The Scots made marmalade a breakfast item, and soon after the rest of Britain followed.

The word marmalade in the English language comes from French marmelade which came from the Portuguese word marmelada, starting with the Greek word melimēlon that means 'sweet apple'.

The preserve has been mentioned in various books and is the fictional character Paddington Bear's favourite food. The 2014 movie Paddington slightly increased marmalade sales in the United Kingdom.

== Origins ==
=== Early history ===
In the 1500s, marmalade was made from quince, and was imported to England from Spain and Italy. The quince jam or quince cheese, was a firm, sticky, sweet reddish hard paste made by slowly cooking quince fruit with sugar, and is still made today.

==== A Collection of Above Three Hundred Receipts ====
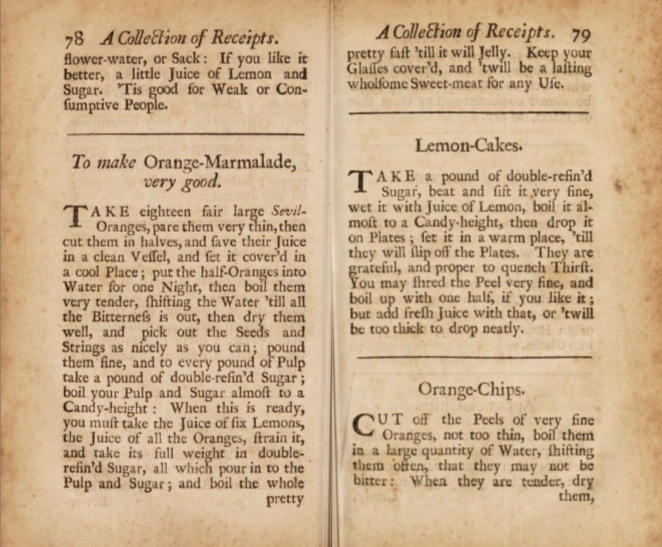
Mary Kettilby's 1714 book A Collection of Above Three Hundred Receipts, pages 78–79

The first printed recipe for orange marmalade, though without the chunks typically used now, was in Mary Kettilby's 1714 cookery book, A Collection of Above Three Hundred Receipts (pages 78–79). The book mentions beaten marmalade, with the orange peel and pulp boiled soft and pounded in the paste.

=== Scottish and English influence ===
The Scots are credited with developing marmalade as a spread, with Scottish recipes in the 18th century using more water to produce a less solid preserve than before.

The Scots were the people who made marmalade a breakfast item. James Boswell and Samuel Johnson were given it at breakfast while in Scotland in 1773. In the 19th century, the English followed suit and began to eat marmalade in the morning. The American writer Louisa May Alcott visited Britain, and later described "a choice pot of marmalade and a slice of cold ham" to be "essentials of English table comfort".

== Etymology ==
=== Actual ===
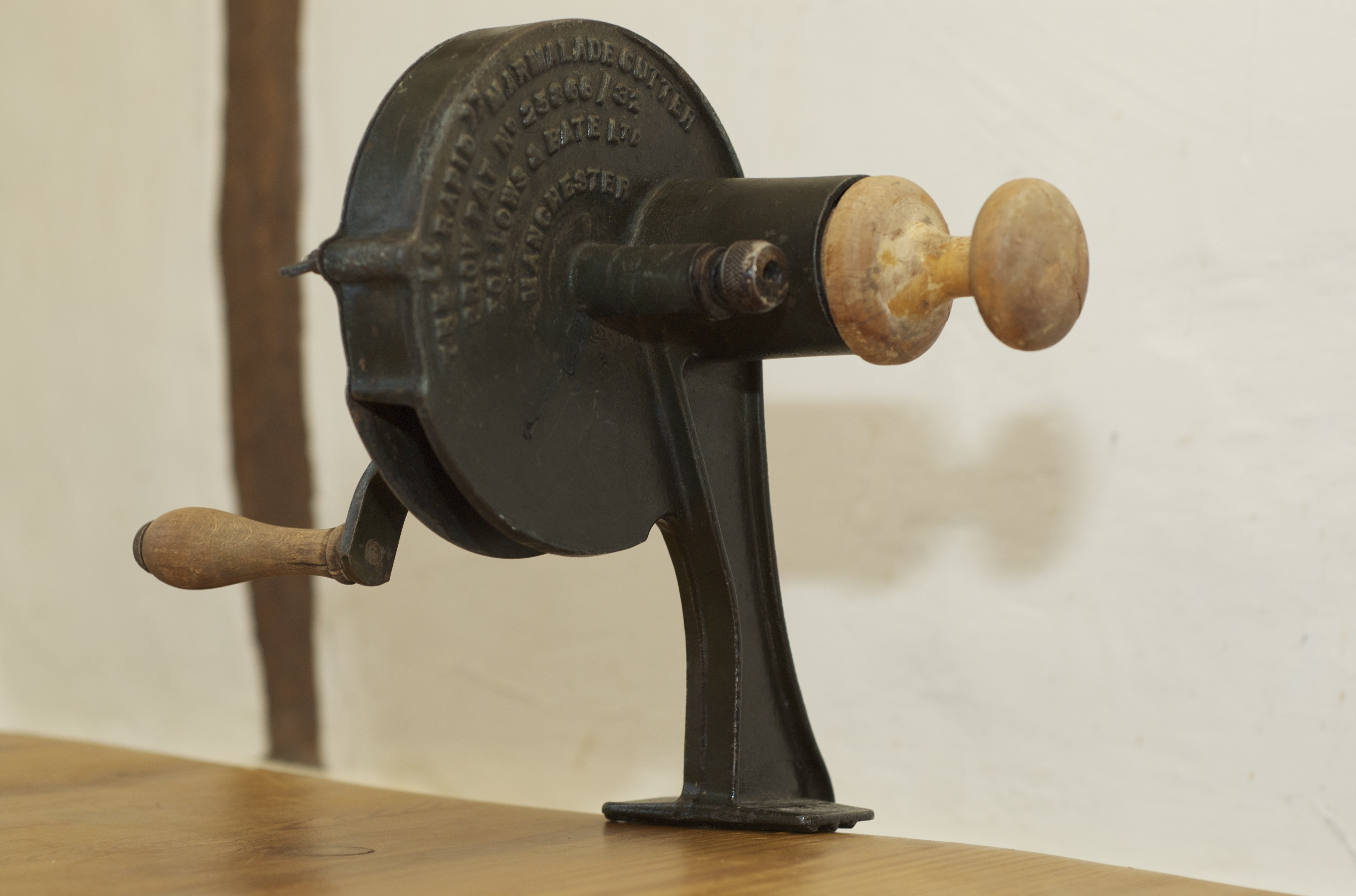
Antique marmalade cutter, used to cut citrus fruit peel into thin slices

The word marmalade in the English language comes from French marmelade which, in turn, came from the Portuguese word marmelada. According to José Pedro Machado's Dicionário Etimológico da Língua Portuguesa, the oldest known document where this Portuguese word is to be found is Gil Vicente's play Comédia de Rubena, written in 1521:

Temos tanta marmelada (transl. We have so much quince jelly.)
Que a minha mãe vai me dar um pouco (transl. That my mother will give me some.)

The Portuguese word comes from the Latin melimelum or "a sweet apple", in turn from Greek μελίμηλον melimēlon 'sweet apple', from μέλη 'honey' + μῆλον mēlon 'apple, round fruit', became Galician-Portuguese marmelo 'quince'. The name originated in the 16th century from Middle French marmelade and Portuguese, where marmelada applied to quince jam. The English recipe book of Eliza Cholmondeley, dated from 1677 and held at the Chester Record Office in the Cheshire county archives, has one of the earliest marmalade recipes ("Marmelet of Oranges") which produced a firm, thick dark paste. The modern definition of marmalade is a jam made from citrus fruits rather than quince.

=== Folk ===
According to a Scottish legend, the creation of orange marmalade in the Scottish city of Dundee occurred by accident. The legend tells of a ship carrying a cargo of oranges that broke down in the port, resulting in some ingenious locals making marmalade out of the cargo. Since then, the city has had a long association with marmalade. However, this legend was "decisively disproved by food historians", according to a New York Times report.

A folk etymology asserts that Mary, Queen of Scots ate marmalade as a treatment for seasickness, and that the name is derived from her maids' whisper of Ma'am est malade ('Ma'am is ill'), though the word's origin has nothing to do with Mary.

== Creation ==
=== Recipe ===
==== Common ingredients ====
Marmalade is made from the juice and peel of citrus fruits boiled with sugar and water. It can be made from bitter orange, lemons, limes, grapefruits, mandarins, sweet oranges, bergamots, blood oranges, clementines, kumquats, navel oranges, citrus taiwanica, or a combination. Citrus is the most typical choice of fruit for marmalade, though historically the term has often been used for non-citrus preserves. Marmalade made from citrus taiwanica has earned international awards and has won, eight bronze, eight silver, and three gold medals at the Dalemain World Marmalade Awards in the United Kingdom.

In Britain, marmalade is usually made from the bitter or Seville orange. It is favoured because of its naturally high pectin content, which gives a thick consistency to the marmalade, in addition to the fruit also having tart flesh and rough skin. There is needed a balance between fruit acid and the pectin. Fruits with normally low pectin, like strawberries, cherries, and figs, have it added to make the marmalade a jelly.

Marmalade has been made from fruits like mango and pineapple in mixed fruit marmalades.

==== Process ====
There are generally five steps of the creation of citrus marmalade: washing, peeling, pre-treatment for peel (de-bittering and sugar-dipping), mixing, and boiling. White sugar has traditionally been used as the main sweetener in marmalades, although sugar substitutes, such as sucralose and saccharin may be used. The choice of sugar substitute depends partly on heat stability, texture effect, and aftertaste.

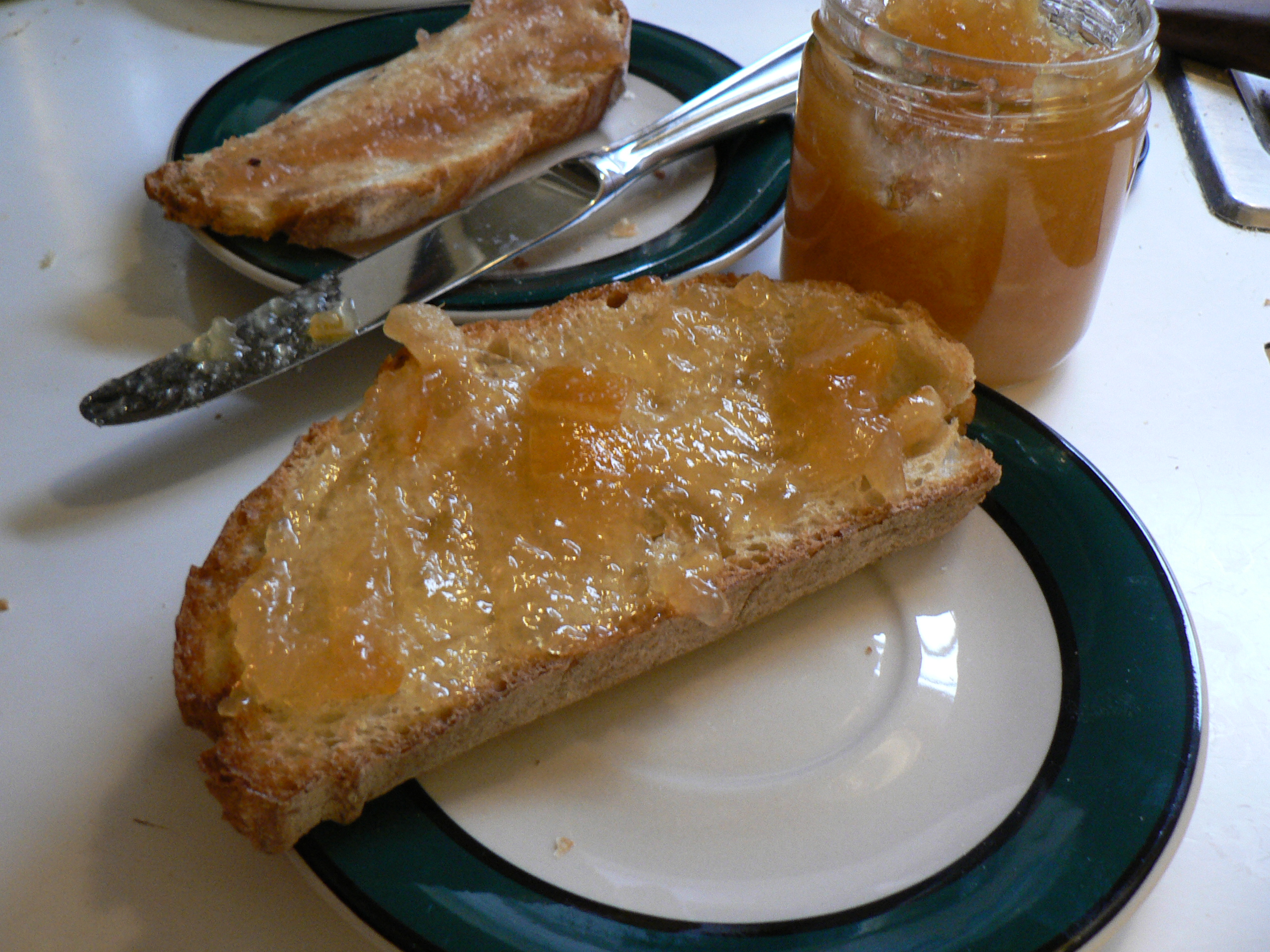
Marmalade on toast

Pectin, spices, or flavouring agents may be added to enhance the marmalade for texture, appearance, aroma, and taste.

=== Serving ===
Marmalade can be served at room temperature or slightly colder. Some bitter orange marmalade can last for up to 6 months after opened, while some lasts only 3. Marmalade can be served on toast, cookies, biscuits, smoothies, and other bakery products.

== Characteristics ==
Orange marmalade
Nutritional value per 100 g (3.5 oz)
- Energy: 246 kcal (1,030 kJ)
- Carbohydrates: 66.3 g
- Sugars: 60 g
- Dietary fiber: 0.7 g
- Fat: 0 g
- Protein: 0.3 g
Vitamins and minerals
Vitamins	Quantity %DV^{†}
Vitamin A equiv.	0% 3 μg
Thiamine (B1)	0% 0.005 mg
Riboflavin (B2)	2% 0.025 mg
Niacin (B3)	0% 0.052 mg
Pantothenic acid (B5)	0% 0.015 mg
Vitamin B6	1% 0.019 mg
Folate (B9)	2% 9 μg
Vitamin C	5% 4.8 mg
Vitamin E	0% 0.06 mg
Minerals	Quantity %DV^{†}
Calcium	3% 38 mg
Iron	1% 0.15 mg
Magnesium	0% 2 mg
Manganese	1% 0.02 mg
Phosphorus	0% 4 mg
Potassium	1% 37 mg
Zinc	0% 0.04 mg
- Other constituents: Quantity
- Water: 33 g
- Link to USDA Database entry
- ^{†}Percentages estimated using US recommendations for adults, except for potassium, which is estimated based on expert recommendation from the National Academies.

Marmalade has a sweet and tangy taste, with a texture similar to jam.

Citrus peel is a main ingredient of marmalade which contains not only numerous functional constituents but also gives the product a different aroma. However, it also contains a variety of bitter compounds which may affect the flavour of marmalade.

=== Nutrition ===
Orange marmalade is 33% water and 66% carbohydrates, with negligible protein and fat content (table). In a reference amount of 100 g (3.5 oz), orange marmalade supplies 246 calories of food energy, with low amounts or no micronutrients present.

Some demand for healthier marmalade, like lowered calories, has been observed in some consumer groups.

== Commerce ==
=== Production companies ===
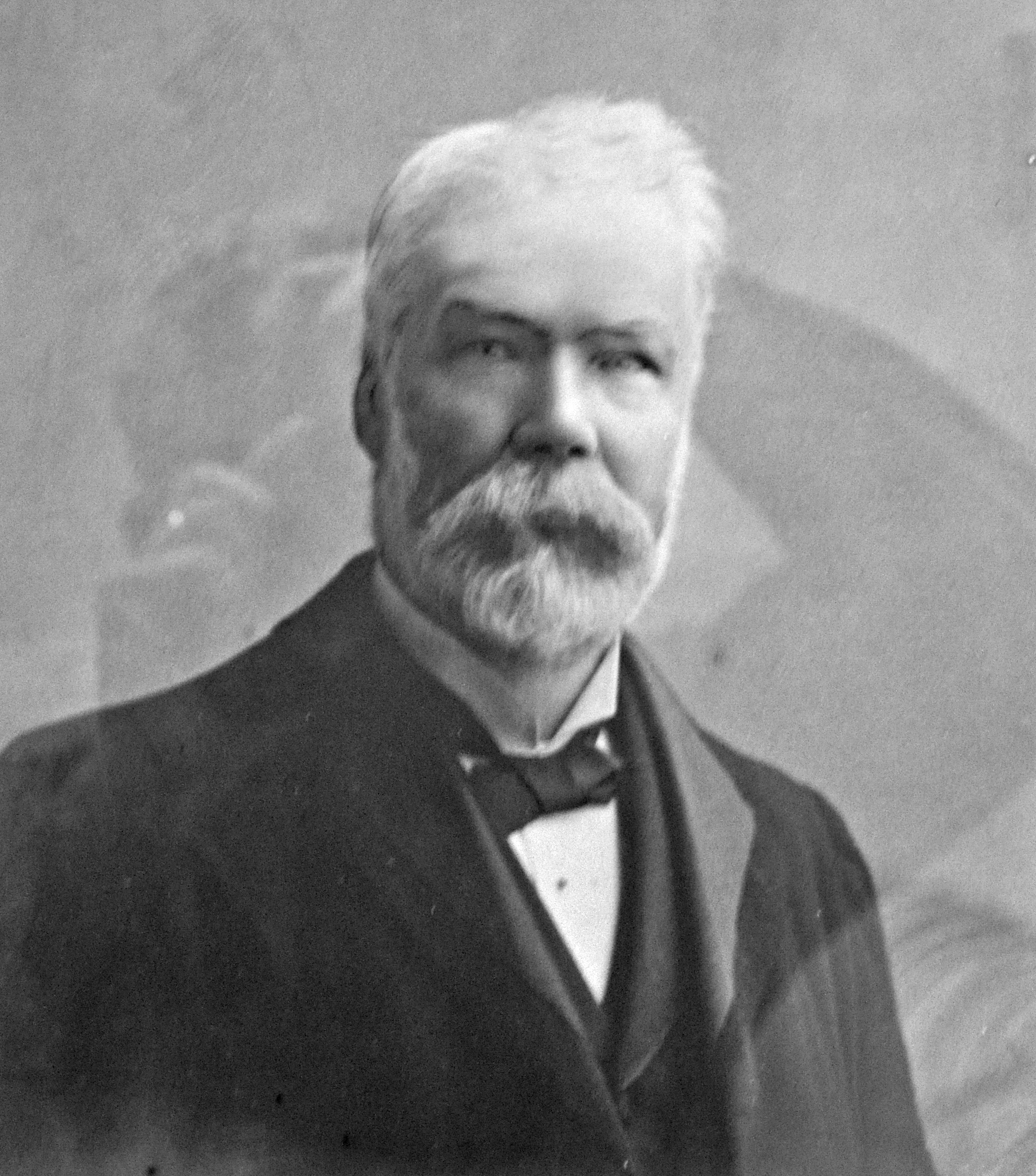
Scottish grocer James Robertson in 1874

James Keiller (died 1839) and his mother, Janet, ran a small sweet and preserves shop in the Seagate area of Dundee. They then began to produce "Dundee Marmalade". The business prospered, and remains a signature marmalade producer today.

The Frank Cooper Oxford Marmalade manufacturing business sold marmalade in 1874. It started out first for just for Oxford students, but the business expanded all over England and abroad.

Robertson's was founded in 1864 by James and Marion Robertson in Paisley, Renfrewshire. The business was known for making Golden Shred marmalade. Today, it no longer exists, and is now owned by Premier Foods, though they still make the same product Golden Shred.

=== Market ===
As of 2021, the international market for jams and preserves was US$8.46 billion. Global value has been projected to increase in the future with almost US$9.90 billion expected in 2027, with an average annual growth of about 3.5% between now and then.

== Legal definitions ==
=== North America ===
Under the Canadian Food and Drug Regulations (C.R.C., c. 870), marmalade is a standardised food and defined as a food of jelly-like composition that consists of at least 65% water-soluble solids. The regulations permit the use of pH adjusting agents to prevent the marmalade from dehydration, antifoaming agents to prevent blemishes on surface coatings and enable efficient filling of containers, and an acid ingredient to compensate for the natural acidity of the citrus fruit used. If pectin is added, the marmalade must contain at least 27% of peel, pulp, or juice of citrus fruit. Class II preservatives may also be used.

The Canadian Food and Drug Regulations (C.R.C., c. 870) specify that pineapple or fig marmalade must be of jelly-like consistency, achieved by boiling the pulp of juice of the fruit with water, and a sweetening ingredient. Pineapple or fig marmalade should contain at least 45% of the named fruit.

In the United States, marmalade should contain at least 65 percent soluble solids, and have at least 70 points to be ranked U.S. Grade B or U.S. Choice.

=== Europe ===
In 1979, the European Economic Community (EEC) passed a directive regulating labelling of fruit jams, jellies and marmalades, which defined marmalade as a gelled mixture of sugars and citrus fruit's pulp, purée, juice, aqueous extracts or peel. Under the directive marmalade had to contain at least 20% citrus fruit of which 7.5% had to be obtained from the endocarp. The strict definition mandating the use of citrus fruits is said to be a result of British lobbying, even though in some other European languages, the word cognate with English marmalade - such as Marmelade in German or marmellata in Italian - is commonly used to refer to other fruit jams, too.

The marmalade definition remained the same until June 2026, except that in 2004 Austria and Germany were granted a derogation to allow fruit jams to be sold as Marmelade at farmers' markets. In 2024, the European Union, from which the UK had withdrawn in 2020 (Brexit), agreed to broaden the definition by allowing member states to permit the label marmalade for other jams, reflecting the interchangeability of the terms in many European languages. The new directive is going to be applicable on 14 June 2026. To avoid consumer confusion, the label of citrus-based marmalades in the directive was renamed to citrus marmalade, in which the word "citrus" may be replaced by the name of the citrus fruit used, e.g. orange marmalade. The ingredient requirements for citrus marmalades remain the same as in the 1979 directive.

The amendment also raises the minimum fruit content of jams: from the current 350 to 450 grams per kilogram, and to 500 grams for ‘extra’ products. The aim is to reduce the sugar content and promote a healthier composition.

As of April 2026, it is expected that the directive could form part of the future EU–UK sanitary and phytosanitary agreement that is being negotiated under prime minister Keir Starmer's "reset" of EU–UK relations, extending the EU rules on marmalades to the UK. The UK government expects the possible agreement to come into force after mid-2027.

== In popular culture ==
=== Paddington Bear ===
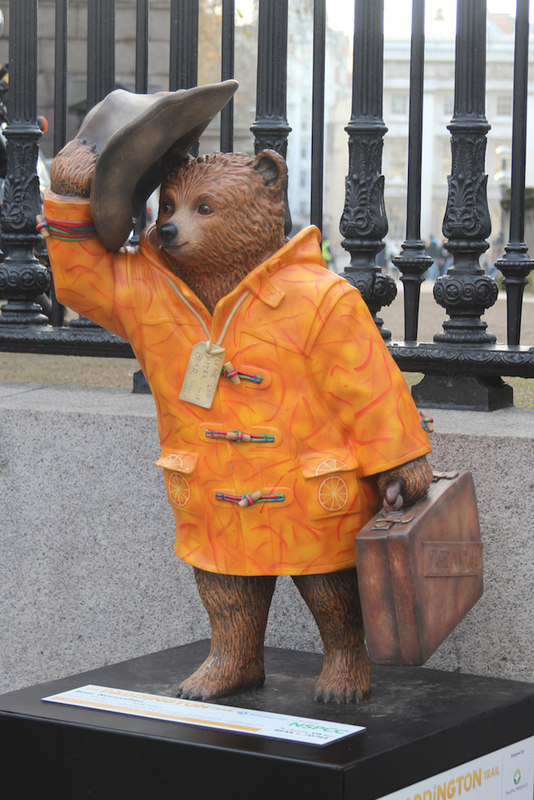
John Hurt's marmalade-themed Paddington Bear statue in London, auctioned to raise funds for the NSPCC

The fictional character Paddington Bear is known for his liking of marmalade, particularly in sandwiches, since he keeps it in his hat wherever he goes. Paddington Bear is now used on the label of the smaller peel ("shred") and clearer/milder Robertson's "Golden Shred" marmalade, in place of the previous icon, the "Golliwog", because it was considered racially offensive. The 2014 movie Paddington led to a slight increase in marmalade sales in the United Kingdom.

=== Other mentions ===
In Agatha Christie's 1953 detective novel A Pocket Full of Rye, the first victim of the murderer is given poison hidden in orange marmalade consumed at breakfast.

In Jane Austen's 1811 novel Sense and Sensibility, an over-indulgent mother feeds apricot marmalade to her fussy three-year-old child who has been slightly scratched by a pin in the mother's hair. Austen in irony of this states, "that she could taste no greater delight than in making a fillagree basket for a spoilt child".

== See also ==
- Murabba, whole fruit preserve
- List of spreads, the list of spreads
- Succade, candied citrus peel, especially that of the citron
- Zest (ingredient), citrus ingredient

== Sources ==
- Wilson, C. Anne (1999) [1985]. The Book of Marmalade: its antecedents, its history and its rôle in the world today together with a collection of recipes for marmalades & marmalade cookery (2 ed.). Constable. ISBN 0-09-465670-3.
