= Helen Louise Bullock =

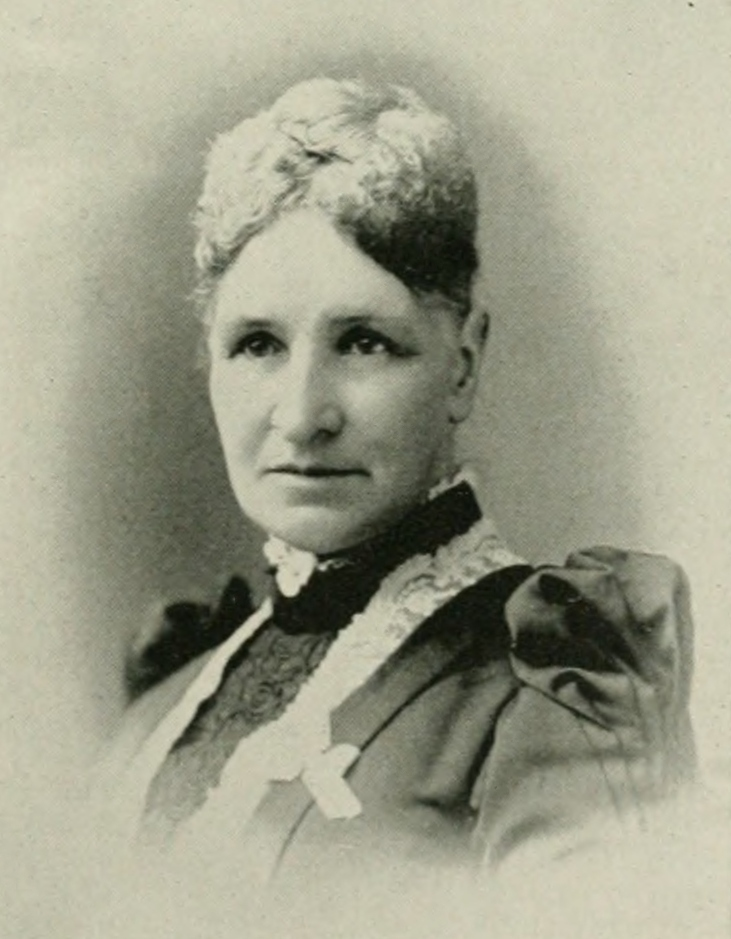
Photo portrait from A Woman of the Century

Helen Louise Bullock (née Helen Louise Chapel; April 29, 1836 – 1927) was a music educator, social reformer, suffragist, and philanthropist from the U.S. state of New York. For 35 years, she taught piano, organ and guitar. She gave up her profession of music, in which she had achieved some prominence, to become a practical volunteer in the work for suffrage and temperance. In 1889, she was appointed national organizer of the Woman's Christian Temperance Union (WCTU) and in that work went from Maine to California, traveling 13,000 miles (21,000 km) in one year. During the first five years of her work, she held over 1,200 meetings, organizing 108 new unions and secured over 10,000 new members, active and honorary. She received in one year the largest two prizes ever given by the national WCTU for organizing work.

== Early life and education ==
Bullock was born in Norwich, New York, in 1836. She was the youngest daughter of Joseph (d. 1861) and Phebe Wood Chapel (d. 1871), of Connecticut and Rhode Island, respectively. Her maternal grandfather, Rev. John Chapel, was a soldier of the Revolutionary war. He was born in New England of English ancestry, and died in Chenango County, New York, about 1830. Bullock's father was a cabinetmaker and wood carver by trade, and took an active part in local politics, serving as sheriff of Chenango County, New York. Her parents were regular attendants of the Presbyterian church. They were married in 1821 and became the parents of eight children, of whom five died in early childhood. Antoinette became the wife of Charles S. La Hotte, who served in the Eighth New York Cavalry during the Civil war, and they spent their lives in Norwich, New York. Francis Chapel (d. 1884, Sioux City, Iowa), the only son who reached maturity, was born in Chenango county, and in 1864 went west, being one of the seven men who founded Sioux City, and also one of the founders of Yankton, South Dakota. Helen completed the family.

Bullock took an elective course in the Norwich Academy and was graduated from that institution in 1854. Some years later she studied the piano with S. B. Mills, and the guitar with Count Lepcowshi, both of New York City.

== Career ==
=== Music educator and composer ===
At 18 years of age, she began to teach piano and vocal music. In November 1885, Bullock came to Elmira, and as a music teacher organized a large class, which she successfully conducted for some time. With the exception of two years, she taught music from 1854 to 1886, and was for many years a member of the National Music Teachers' Association. In 1881, she published two books of musical studies, "Scales and Chords" and "Improved Musical Catechism", both of which had a large sale. When William A. Pond, who purchased the copyrights, was arranging for their publication, he requested the author's name to be given as H. L. Bullock, in order that the foreign teachers might not know they were written by a woman, and therefore be prejudiced against or undervalue them. It was very hard for her to give up her music profession, but after great consideration she devoted her life to temperance reform. For 35 years, she taught piano, organ and guitar.

=== Woman's Christian Temperance Union ===
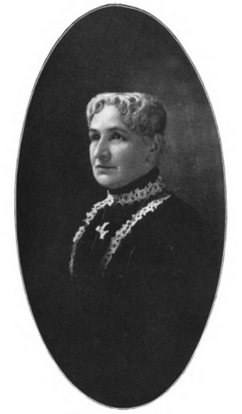
Helen Louise Bullock

From 1871 to 1885 her home was in Fulton, New York, but after a serious illness of pneumonia her physician recommended a milder climate, and the family moved to Elmira, New York.

In April 1886 she was made president of the city WCTU, which was organized with 30 members, and held that position for two years and ten months. Attending the first state convention at Albany, New York in that year, she was chosen state organizer of the work, which position she filled for three years. In September of that year Mary T. Burt, president of the New York State WCTU, organized Chemung County and urged Bullock to go into the adjoining counties of Broome, Schuyler, Tioga and Yates and organize them, which she did.

In 1889, she was appointed national organizer of the WCTU, and in that work went from Maine to California, traveling 13,000 miles (21,000 km) in one year. In that department, she achieved marked success; during the first five years, she held over 1,200 meetings, organizing 180 new unions, and securing over 10,000 members, active and honorary. Also in 1889, she resigned the presidency of the local union and took up national work, being made national organizer at Chicago the same year. She served as such, and was a delegate to every national convention, attending all except the one held at Seattle in 1900. Her work took her all over the US, becoming one of the most instructive lecturers in the temperance field. At the world's convention, held at Toronto in 1897, she was appointed "around the world missionary," but met with an accident in a street car which prevented her from going, and was in a sanitarium for some months. She met with another serious accident while in Chicago in 1899. During the World's Fair in that city, in 1893, she delivered an interesting lecture before the Woman's Congress.

Bullock was assisted by her daughter, Florence, and since 1899 they had charge of the national headquarters of the WCTU, at Chautauqua, New York, conducting conferences in the different departments. Both were prominent speakers. The daughter was connected with the Loyal Legion, was acting secretary, and was appointed national associate in the purity work, having charge of the home office. In the national union, Bullock was a member of the executive committee, and was chairman of the standing committee on Sabbath meetings since 1896, seeing that all pulpits were filled where speakers had been invited to fill them during the national conventions. In 1902, she again received this appointment, but was obliged to decline, as the purity conference demanded her time during the conventions. During the 16 years of her organizing work, she secured over 25,000 members for the organization, all of whom have received the white ribbon badge from Bullock.

=== Activist ===
In 1887, she was named WCTU New York State superintendent of the department of narcotics, and in 1888, national lecturer on that subject. She was instrumental in securing the New York State law against selling cigarettes and tobacco to minors. In the interest of that department, she wrote the leaflet "The Tobacco Toboggan." She was deeply interested in prison and police matron work, and was president, since its organization, of the Anchorage of Elmira, a rescue home for young girls; its name was subsequently changed to the Helen L. Bullock Industrial Training School for Girls. In 1892, she was appointed superintendent of the school of methods of the New York State WCTU. She held the office of national superintendent of purity and mothers meetings, and state superintendent of purity. For a time she was superintendent of narcotics in New York and secured the passage of the anti-cigarette bill. The curfew law came under her national department of purity, and she became instrumental in having it secured in hundreds of towns and cities throughout the country. In local work, Bullock was president of the Anchorage, in which many a fallen girl has become a self-respecting woman and a useful member of society. She received in one year the largest two prizes ever given by the national WCTU for organizing work.

She was active in Elmira's politics, as well as the suffrage movement.

== Personal life ==
At Norwich, she was married in 1856 to Daniel S. Bullock, son of Rev. Seymour Bullock, of Prospect, New York, a Methodist Episcopal minister. He was born in Oneida County, New York, in 1833, and was for a number of years a merchant at Bainbridge, New York. Daniel subsequently spent two years in the west and then located in Fulton, Oswego County, New York, where he engaged in the carriage business. There Bullock taught music, remaining at that place 14 years. By this marriage, she had three children: Frank C., who was educated at Falley Seminary, became the editor of the Fulton Times, and died in Fulton in 1884, at the age of 27 years, leaving a wife but no children; Phoebe L. died in infancy; and Florence L., born April 22, 1879, who made her home with her mother in Elmira. She was a graduate of the high school of this city, and also took a c≤ourse in kindergarten work at Providence, Rhode Island. Soon after the death of her son, in 1884, Bullock adopted a little motherless girl, five years of age.

Bullock's religious training was in the Presbyterian Church and Sunday-school, but, when converted, her ideas on baptism led her to unite with the Baptist Church. She was active in the Sunday school and missionary work.

== Bibliography ==
- Byrne, Thomas E. (2000). The Chemung Historical Journal. Chemung County Historical Society.
