= A Collection of Above Three Hundred Receipts in Cookery, Physick and Surgery =

1714 English cookery book

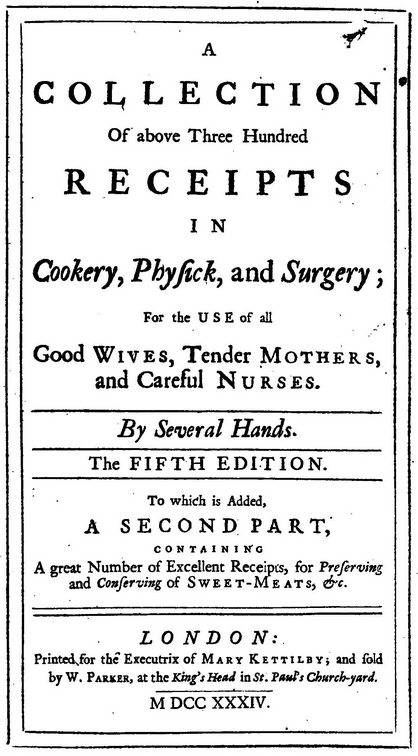
Title page of A Collection of above Three Hundred Receipts by Mary Kettilby, 5th edition, 1734

A Collection of Above Three Hundred Receipts in Cookery, Physick and Surgery is an English cookery book by Mary Kettilby and others, first published in 1714 by Richard Wilkin.

The book contains early recipes for plum (Christmas) pudding and suet pudding, and the first printed recipe for orange marmalade (without chunks).

== Book ==
Mary Kettilby indicated her intended audience with the book's full title, A Collection of above Three Hundred Receipts in Cookery, Physick and Surgery; For the Use of all Good Wives, Tender Mothers, and Careful Nurses. It was thus aimed squarely at women. The book was actually a collective effort: the preface states that "a Number of very Curious and Delicate House-wives Clubb'd to furnish out this Collection".

The book contains an early recipe for suet pudding, and the first printed recipe for orange marmalade, though without the chunks typically used now.

=== Contents ===
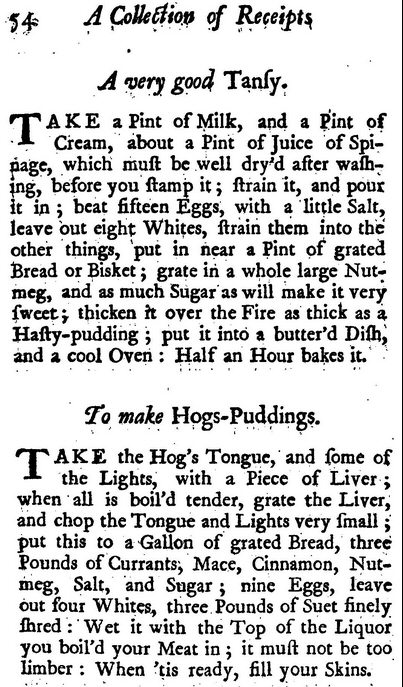
Recipes for "Tansy" and "Hogs-Puddings"

The book is divided into chapters for food and chapters for remedies. Page numbers apply to the 5th edition.

[Part I]

- A Collection of Receipts in Cookery, &c. 9
- A Collection of Receipts in Physick and Surgery 99
- Index

Part II

- A Collection of Receipts in Cookery, &c. 193
- A Collection of Receipts in Physick and Surgery 233
- Index

=== Approach ===
Apart from the Preface, there is no introduction of any sort: the recipes follow immediately after the chapter headings. The book is clearly divided into chapters of recipes for food and for remedies, but within the chapters there is no definite structure. For example, the first chapter begins with six recipes for soups, followed by recipes for collared beef, "French-Cutlets", collared mutton, stewed pigeons, broiled pigeons, dressed turbot, and then patties "for a Dish of Fish". While some logic may be discerned in this ordering, readers need to refer to the index to locate any particular dish.

The recipes are given either as goals, as "To make Hogs-Puddings", or as titles, sometimes with descriptions, as "A very good Tansy". Quantities are given in whichever units are convenient, as "a Gallon of grated Bread", "three Pounds of Currants", or "nine Eggs". Often, quantities rely on the cook's judgement, as "as much Sugar as will make it very sweet". Temperatures and timings are given when necessary, as "a cool Oven: Half an Hour bakes it." There are no lists of ingredients.

=== Editions ===
The following editions are known. No additions were made to the 3rd, or 4th editions.

- 1714 1st edition, Richard Wilkin (free, but login required)
- 1719 2nd edition, Richard Wilkin, with a Part II of recipes supplied by readers
- 1724 3rd edition
- 1728 4th edition
- 1734 5th edition (posthumous, "printed for the Executrix of Mary Kettilby")

== Reception ==
Mary Ellen Snodgrass comments that the Collection was "for ordinary housewives", in "parallel to court cookbooks".
