= Helen Bullock (historian) =

American historian

Helen Duprey Bullock (1905 – 1 November 1995) was a historian whose work focused on the cuisine and architecture of the early United States.

== Life ==
Helen Claire Duprey Bullock was born in Oakland, California. In the 1920s and 1930s, she worked at the Colonial Williamsburg Foundation as an archivist. Her first book The Williamsburg Art of Cookery was published in 1938 and helped launch the study of American culinary history as a field. In the 1940s, Bullock worked for the Library of Congress and catalogued the papers of Thomas Jefferson and Abraham Lincoln. She later worked for the National Trust for Historic Preservation. At the National Trust, she served as editor and wrote articles for the organization's magazine, Historical Report. Starting in the 1950s and working with the Trust's first director, Frederick L. Rath, Bullock was involved with the publication for 20 years. Bullock was an honorary member of the American Institute of Architects and an honorary trustee of the United States Capitol Historical Society.

Described by the New York Times as "the nation's leading authority on open-hearth cooking," Bullock was a historical consultant for several cookbooks including The American Heritage Cookbook, the First Ladies' Cookbook and Mary and Vincent Price Present A National Treasury of Cookery, all published in the 1960s. She worked as a visiting lecturer at Columbia University, the University of Virginia, Cornell University, and Virginia Polytechnic University.

Bullock retired in 1973 and died in Washington, D.C., of sepsis on November 1, 1995, at the age of 90. Her papers are held at the Schlesinger Library at Harvard University.

== Publications ==
- The Williamsburg Art of Cookery (1938)
- My Head and My Heart: A Little History of Thomas Jefferson and Maria Cosway(1945)

== See also ==
- Cuisine of the Thirteen Colonies
- Colonial Williamsburg
- Food studies
- Historic preservation
