= Roast turkey =

Poultry dish

Whole

Carved

Roast turkey is a turkey that has been roasted on a spit, in an oven, or over or before a fire or coals.

While roasting turkey resembles roasting chicken, turkeys are large birds and require adjustments to cooking times, technique, and scale. Their meat easily becomes dry, which has led to cooks using techniques like brining and manufacturers selling "self-basting" turkeys that are injected with a flavorful brine.

Turkey was being cooked through roasting in North America at the time of European contact. Europeans brought the birds back with them, and by the late-16th century turkey was commonly consumed across Western Europe. Turkey appeared in cookbooks around this time, with roast turkey appearing among the first printed recipes. Roast turkey was particularly popular in English cookbooks in the mid-18th century—stuffed and served alongside gravy and various sauces—in preparations which were exported to the Thirteen Colonies. Roast turkey likely gained its modern association with Thanksgiving around 1800, and it was not until the early 20th century that the roast bird came to clearly dominate the holiday meal.

Roast turkey is today ubiquitous at the American Thanksgiving dinner, served with cranberry sauce and stuffing, and is eaten in countries like Chile, England and the Philippines at Christmas. Leftovers are often repurposed for other meals such as soups and Thanksgiving sandwiches.

== Method ==
Basting a turkey as it roasts

Roast turkey is made in a similar manner to roast chicken, with adjustments made to timing and scale.

In the United States, several versions of turkeys are sold intended for roasting. Some, marketed as "self-basting" or "enhanced" turkeys, are injected with a flavorful brine solution. Many birds are sold frozen, which may necessitate up to 4 days of thawing for large birds. Before roasting, the food writer J. Kenji López-Alt advises removing the wishbone to make carving easier.

Turkeys can be roasted on a sheet pan or roasting trays with high sides. While a sheet pan is preferred by some cooks as it permits airflow over the bird, leaving the skin crispy, some particularly large turkeys will only fit in a roasting tray. As the turkey roasts, fat renders off. Some cooks take advantage of this by setting the bird over roasting vegetables, or collecting it and using it in cooking.

=== Moist meat ===
Turkey meat easily becomes dry as it is roasted. Part of the reason behind this is the bird's legs require a higher temperature than the breast to break down connective tissue and render fat—Cook's Illustrated describes roasting a whole turkey as "a race to keep the white meat from drying out while the dark meat cooks through." Another reason turkey becomes dry is that the naturally lean bird has little fat to contribute moisture to the cooked meat. Their size contributes too: like ham, standing rib roasts and other large portions of meat, the surface and internal temperatures can diverge considerably.

Several solutions have been offered to keep the meat moist after roasting. The brine solution injected into "self-basting" or "enhanced" turkeys is one of these; while it does so successfully, it dilutes the bird's flavor and alters its texture. Cook's Illustrated recommends cooking at a low temperature and elevating on a rack to promote heat and air circulation to attain even-cooking, and advises starting with the breast with its skin to the rack, before flipping it partway through cooking. López-Alt gives a different answer, reporting the most juicy meat comes through dry brining.

=== Crispy skin ===
A roast turkey with crispy skin is greatly sought after among some diners, although the preference is not universal. Turning up the heat at the end of cooking can produce a crispy skin, but can dry the meat out at the same time. Methods put forward to produce a crispy skin while leaving the meat moist have included air-drying the bird overnight, letting the turkey sit after cooking to allow the internal temperature to come down before returning it to the oven at a high temperature, and avoiding covering the bird in foil after cooking.

== History ==
Turkeys have been eaten roasted in North America since before the arrival of Europeans, and among the Navajo as observed at contact, they were eaten no other way. While there are few records of preparations of turkey in precolonial Mexico, the residents of Yucatán are recorded presenting the first Europeans in the territory with roasted turkeys.

After European explorers encountered the bird in the New World, they sent specimens back in the early 1500s, and turkeys may have already become widespread in Spain by the 1530s. The first recipes for roast turkey appear in Italy, where turkeys had become common by the mid-16th century in the 1570 cookbook Opera dell'arte del cucinare by Bartolomeo Scappi. These appeared alongside the first printed recipes for turkey ever—Scappi roasted his on a spit. In England, recipes for roast turkey were appearing around the same time, again among the earliest recipes for the bird. The first, a recipe for a turkey, split in two and baked is printed in A Book of Cookrye (1584) by an A. W., and it is printed alongside a recipe for an accompanying sauce; Andrew F. Smith suggests this may have been to make the tough flesh produced by 16th-century baking techniques more palatable. Recipes for roast turkey first appeared in Spain in Diego Granado's Libro del arte de cozina (1599). This was decades after the birds had become common in the country; Smith proposes the delay may be because people understood turkeys should be cooked like peafowl, which many cookbooks of the time contained recipes for. In France too, turkeys began to frequently appear from the 16th century.

Among these early preparations, turkeys were roasted both indoors and outdoors. Outside, turkeys were roasted on a grate, set over coals, while inside, they were set before an open fire, offset to avoid fat dripping onto the flames and causing flare-ups. Another method roasted the turkey on a spit. In wealthy households, these spits could be powered mechanically, but generally the spit was rotated by servants or children. Roasting was not as common as boiling, as it produced a tougher, less moist meat, but even when boiled, many cookbooks of the time advised a final roast to give the skin color and crispiness. Later inside preparations roasted the turkey in a reflector oven.

1772 engraving of A Turkey for Roasting by Paul Revere

Recipes for roast turkey pervaded 18th-century English cookbooks. Hannah Glasse in The Art of Cookery Made Plain and Easy (1747) includes with her recipe two preparations of stuffing and three sauces—oyster, bread, and onion—on top of the gravy the reader was presumed to be serving the turkey with. Another cookbook of the era was Eliza Smith's The Compleat Housewife (1727) which proved influential in North America when in 1742 it became the first cookbook published in the Thirteen Colonies.

In North America, several methods were being employed in turkey roasting. Adriaen van der Donck, writing in New Netherland in the mid-17th century, gave praise to cleaned wild turkeys cooked on a spit, calling them "excellent" and like the taste of tame turkeys. In the Carolinas, turkeys were recorded being roasted in the mid-18th century with their intestines still inside. The practice was still extant in the area during the early 19th century, when it was noted by a traveler to the area who gave an unfavorable assessment. By the time the United States was established, turkey was being eaten across several holidays, with a record from 1777 in Philadelphia describing roast turkey being eaten as part of a Christmas spread, alongside minced pies and pudding. Amelia Simmons included a preparation in her 1796 cookbook American Cookery, giving a recipe for a stuffing similar to one of Glasse's. Recipes for roast turkey would continue to follow English preparations across the 19th century.

=== From the 19th century ===
A roast turkey is carved in a mid-19th century illustration of a Thanksgiving dinner

It was probably not until around 1800 that the turkey became associated with Thanksgiving. James Stuart, a Scottish politician travelling through Boston during Thanksgiving, 1828, found the quantity of turkeys for sale in markets remarkable. He was informed by his guides that "on thanksgiving days persons of every condition have a roasted turkey at dinner". Eliza Leslie, the author of several popular cookbooks in the 19th century, was the first American author to include recipes for turkey for Christmas dinners. Among boiled turkeys served with celery and oyster sauces, she gives a recipe for roast turkey with cranberry sauce. This was influential in America, where several other authors followed her example for turkey taking a prominent place at holidays.

In the 19th century in England, roast turkey began to lose the favour of the English upper class in favour of braising. In France, roast turkey was widely eaten, as Brillat-Savarin attested in 1825:

When our farmers and winegrowers regale themselves on a winter’s evening, what do we see roasting before the kitchen fire, close to which the white-clothed table is set? A turkey. When the useful tradesman, or the hard-worked artist, invites a few friends to an occasional treat, what dish is he expected to set before them? A nice roast turkey stuffed with sausage meat and Lyons chestnuts. And in our highest gastronomical society, when politics are obliged to give way to dissertations on matters of taste, what is desired, what is looked out for at the second course? A truffled turkey.

Over the course of the 19th century in America, the Thanksgiving meal increasingly came to dominate the Thanksgiving holiday, yet it was not until the next century that turkey unambiguously became the dominant element of Thanksgiving dinners. Turkeys were smaller than they are today, with the largest weighing up to 8 lb (3.6 kg), and were often served alongside hearty foods such as chicken pie. Roast turkey continued to appear often at Christmas dinners in the US into the 20th century, when it became increasingly rare as the roast turkey became more closely associated with Thanksgiving.

J. Kenji López-Alt describes his impression of the state of roast turkey around 2000 in the United States in The Food Lab (2015). Turkey then "wasn't something that could be ruined", because the default was a dry and tough meat. According to López-Alt, this changed over the following decade as brining gained uptake in kitchens. By the mid-2010s, food media in print, online, and on television routinely came out with yearly recipes for roast turkey, presenting theirs as new and the best yet. These optimized for different outcomes: the appearance of a plump, deeply colored table centerpiece, others for stuffing, and others for people who care for the meat without regard for the skin.

== Modern consumption ==
In the New England region of the northeastern US, diners serve roast turkey with cranberry sauce and mashed potatoes.

=== Thanksgiving ===
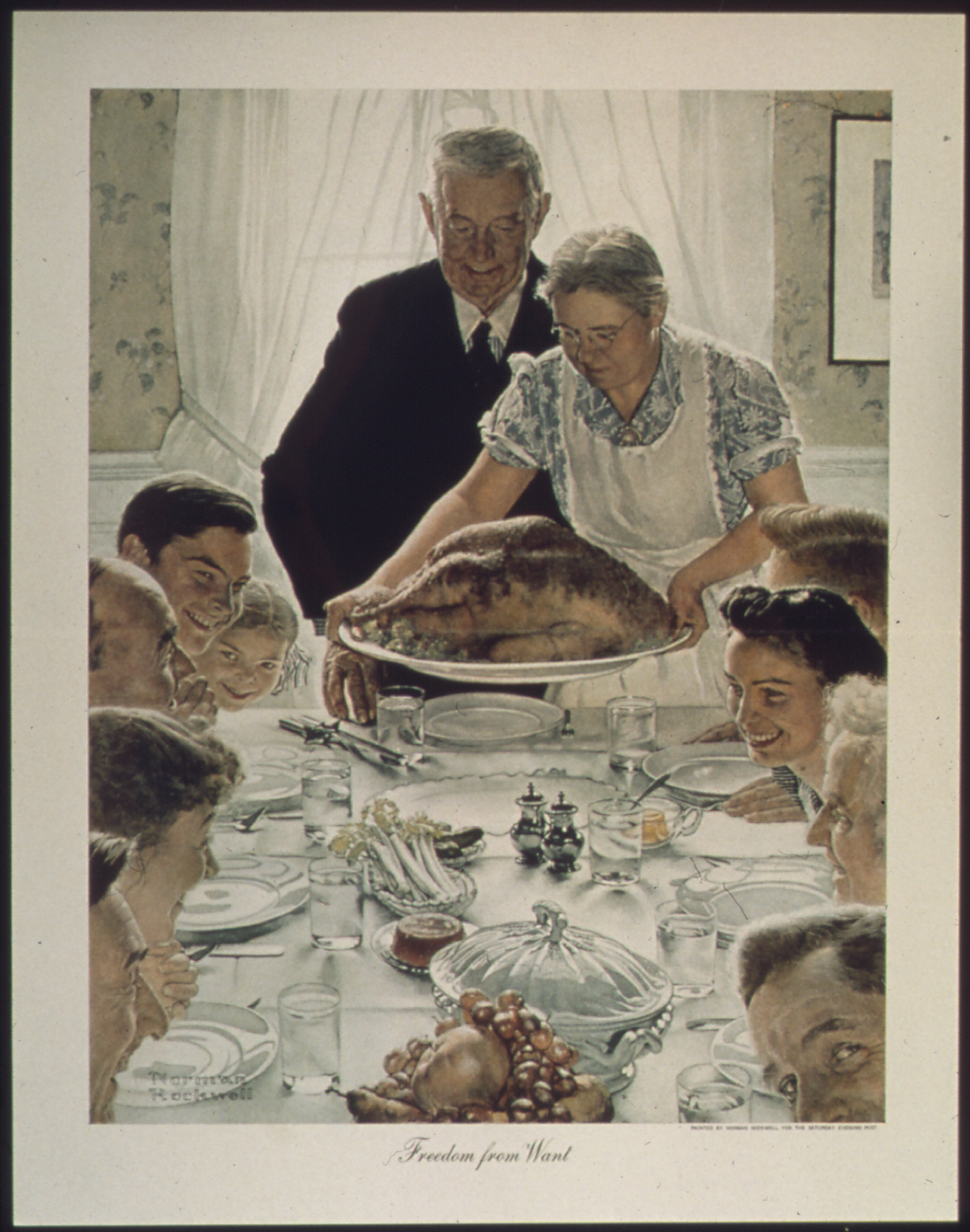
Freedom from Want (1943)

In a roast turkey prepared for a typical Thanksgiving in the US, the bird is served with cranberry sauce or relish, and stuffed—with chestnuts generally, and with oysters along parts of the east coast. The preparation is closely associated with the holiday, so much so that vegetarian dishes served on Thanksgiving will sometimes take the form of tofu or wheat gluten formed into the shape of a roast turkey. Despite this ubiquity, roast turkey has a poor reputation in the United States. Thanksgiving will often be the only time of the year people prepare the bird, and according to López-Alt, most only make and eat it out of a sense of duty to tradition. López-Alt credits the bird's reputation to this infrequent preparation, writing that the turkey tastes poor because "most people never really get too good at cooking it".

Thanksgiving is observed in Puerto Rico, where roast turkeys may be stuffed with breadfruit, mofongo de yuca, or plantain. One roast turkey dish of the territory is pavochón (a portmanteau of turkey (pavo) and pork (lechón)), made by rubbing the bird with a garlic adobo and cooking it over coals in the same way as pernil, a slow-roasted marinated pork dish. At a Puerto Rican Thanksgiving, these dishes may be served with rice and beans. Outside of the US, roast turkey is also eaten at the Canadian Thanksgiving.

=== Christmas ===
Roast turkey is among the dishes typically eaten on Christmas Day in Canada and Chile. In the Caribbean, roast turkey is eaten at Christmas in Dominica, and while roast pig is typical in Puerto Rico, pavochón, roast turkey cooked in the same style will sometimes be served instead.

In the Philippines, roast turkey or chicken is eaten at Noche Buena, a Christmas meal in the early hours of December 25, following Midnight Mass. In the Piedmont region of northwest Italy, a roast turkey stuffed with sausage, eggs, chestnuts, cheese and chopped pork is a traditional Christmas meal, preceded by a series of antipasti.

Roast turkey continues to be eaten on Christmas Day in England, usually at lunchtime, eaten with stuffing, gravy and bread sauce. Elsewhere in the UK, roast turkey forms part of the Christmas dinner spread in Scotland.

=== St Martin's Day ===
Roast turkey and chestnuts were historically common in Italy as ritual foods for St. Martin's Day, captured in the Venetian saying La paeta gù un destin che finisse a San Martin ("The turkey has a destiny which ends on San Martino's Day"). By the end of the 20th century the practice was little observed, only followed by a few, mainly elderly people in central and southern Italy. One roasted turkey dish still prepared for St Martin's Day in Nereto, Abruzzo, is tacchino alla porchetta, and requires cooking a turkey like porchetta. Turkeys are fed on walnut shells to produce a bird with firm, fat-free meat. Before the festival, they are killed, dressed, and garlic, rosemary and bay leaves stuffed into the cavity and rubbed into the skin. Midway through cooking, the bird is split in two and returned to the oven, skin side down in a pan. The final turkey tastes strongly of herbs and has a crisp skin.

== Leftovers ==
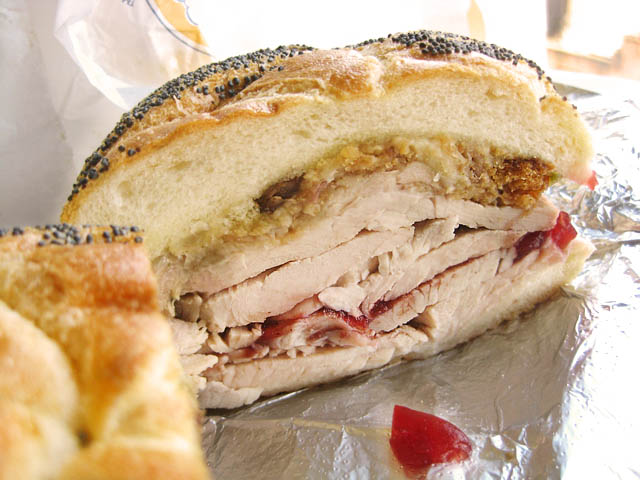
A Thanksgiving sandwich containing turkey, dressing, and cranberry sauce

Leftover roast turkey is frequently repurposed into dishes like soups and sandwiches. Such sandwiches are known under a range of names in America, including the Thanksgiving sandwich, the gobbler, the leftover sandwich, or in New England, the pilgrim. Sandwiches using leftover roast turkey have existed since at least the 19th century, when a recipe for a turkey sandwich appears in Theodore Francis Garrett's The Encyclopædia of Practical Cookery. Published in 1890 in London, it contains a heated mixture of roast turkey, soft-boiled eggs, celery and seasoning.

Fannie Farmer gave another recipe for leftover roast turkey in a 1915 column, with a preparation of "Escalloped Potatoes". In Louisiana, turkey carcass left over following Thanksgiving is often repurposed into "turkey bone gumbo".

== See also ==
- List of Christmas dishes
- Christmas sandwich
- Hot turkey commercial
- Roast goose
- Turkey as food

== Sources ==
- Broomfield, Andrea (2011). "Scotland". In Albala, Ken (ed.). Food Cultures of the World Encyclopedia. Vol. 4: Europe. Santa Barbara, California: Greenwood Press. ISBN 978-0-313-37626-9.
- Dupree, Nathalie (2011). "United States: The South". In Albala, Ken (ed.). Food Cultures of the World Encyclopedia. Vol. 2: The Americas. Santa Barbara, California: Greenwood Press. ISBN 978-0-313-37626-9.
- Field, Carol (1990). Celebrating Italy. New York: W. Morrow & Co. ISBN 0-688-07093-0.
- Gunderson, Mary (2011). "Chile". In Albala, Ken (ed.). Food Cultures of the World Encyclopedia. Vol. 2: The Americas. Santa Barbara, California: Greenwood Press. ISBN 978-0-313-37626-9.
- Janer, Zilkia (2011). "Puerto Rico". In Albala, Ken (ed.). Food Cultures of the World Encyclopedia. Vol. 2: The Americas. Santa Barbara, California: Greenwood Press. ISBN 978-0-313-37626-9.
- López-Alt, J. Kenji (2015). The Food Lab. New York: W. W. Norton Company. ISBN 978-0-393-08108-4.
- Mason, Laura (2011). "Great Britain". In Albala, Ken (ed.). Food Cultures of the World Encyclopedia. Vol. 4: Europe. Santa Barbara, California: Greenwood Press. ISBN 978-0-313-37626-9.
- Ortiz Cuadra, Cruz M. (2013) [2006 in Spanish]. Eating Puerto Rico: A History of Food, Culture, and Identity. Latin America in Translation. Translated by Davidson, Russ. Chapel Hill, North Carolina: University of North Carolina Press. ISBN 978-1-4696-0882-2.
- Ragland, Meg (2011). "United States: New England". In Albala, Ken (ed.). Food Cultures of the World Encyclopedia. Vol. 2: The Americas. Santa Barbara, California: Greenwood Press. ISBN 978-0-313-37626-9.
- Roahen, Sara (2014). "Turkey Bone Gumbo: From Gumbo Tales". In Cognard-Black, Jennifer; Goldthwaite, Melissa A (eds.). Books That Cook: The Making of a Literary Meal. New York and London: New York University Press. pp. 198–203. ISBN 978-1-4798-3021-3.
- Roberts, Owen; Moore, Rebecca; Stewart, Anita (2011). "Canada". In Albala, Ken (ed.). Food Cultures of the World Encyclopedia. Vol. 2: The Americas. Santa Barbara, California: Greenwood Press. ISBN 978-0-313-37626-9.
- Schorger, Arlie W. (1966). Wild Turkey: Its History and Domestication. Norman: University of Oklahoma Press.
- Smith, Andrew F. (2006). The Turkey: An American Story. Chicago, Illinois: University of Illinois Press. ISBN 0-252-03163-6.
- Stavely, Keith W. F.; Fitzgerald, Kathleen (2004). America's Founding Food: The Story of New England Cooking. Chapel Hill, North Carolina: University of North Carolina Press. ISBN 0-8078-2894-7.
- Steinberg, Maria "Ging" Gutierrez (2011). "Philippines". In Albala, Ken (ed.). Food Cultures of the World Encyclopedia. Vol. 3: Asia and Oceania. Santa Barbara, California: Greenwood Press. ISBN 978-0-313-37626-9.
- Sorhaindo, Celia; Parkinson, Rosemary (2011). "Dominica". In Albala, Ken (ed.). Food Cultures of the World Encyclopedia. Vol. 2: The Americas. Santa Barbara, California: Greenwood Press. ISBN 978-0-313-37626-9.
- The Science of Good Cooking: Master 50 Simple Concepts to Enjoy a Lifetime of Success in the Kitchen. Brookline, Massachusetts: America's Test Kitchen. 2012. ISBN 978-1-933615-98-1.
