= Christmas dinner =

Meal traditionally eaten at Christmas

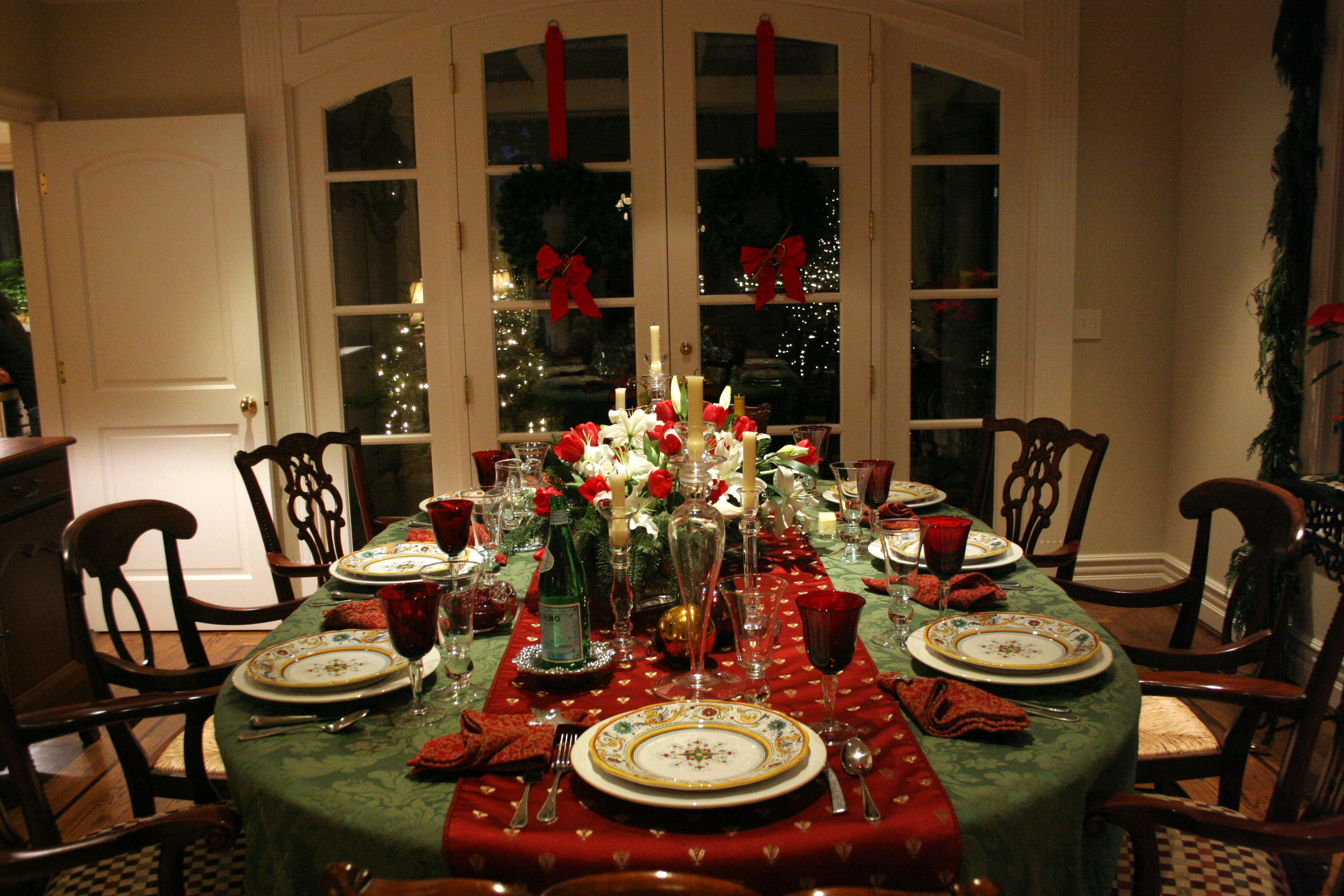
Traditional Christmas dinner setting

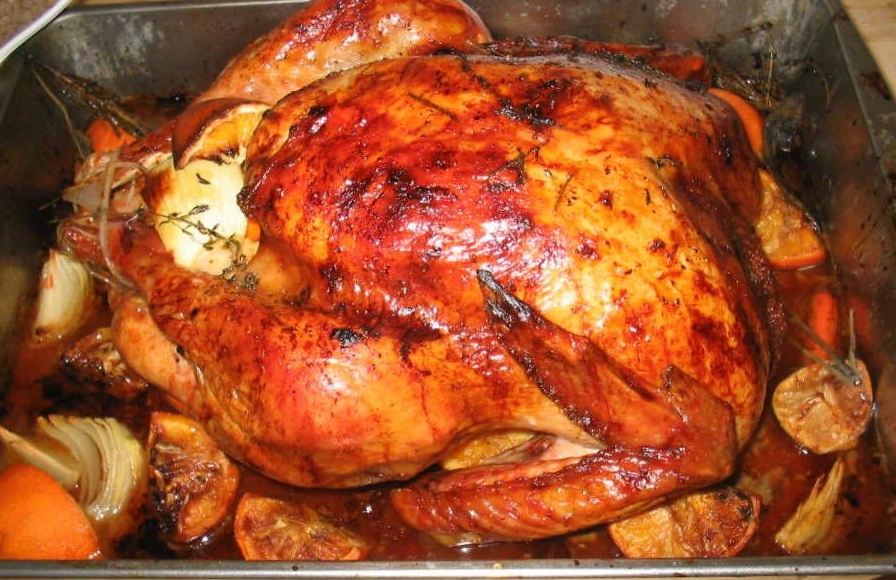
Roast dinner, often centered on turkey, is commonly consumed in English-speaking countries.

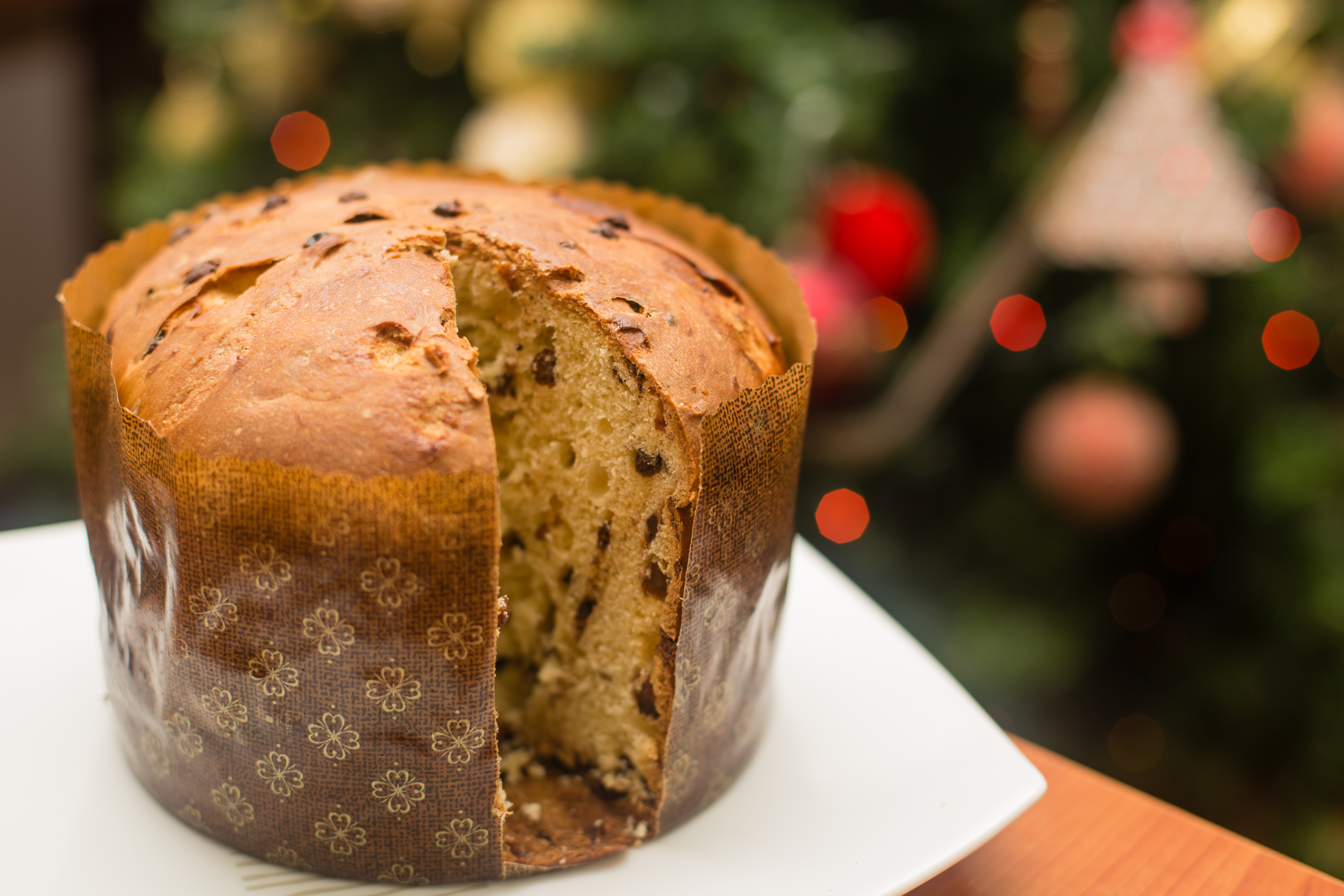
Panettone, an Italian type of fruitcake, is enjoyed at Christmas in several countries.

Christmas dinner is a meal traditionally eaten at Christmas. This meal can take place any time from the evening of Christmas Eve to the evening of Christmas Day itself. The meals are often particularly rich and substantial, in the tradition of the Christian feast day celebration, and form a significant part of gatherings held to celebrate the arrival of Christmastide. In many cases, there is a ritual element to the meal related to the religious celebration, such as the saying of grace.

The actual meal consumed varies considerably across different parts of the world, reflecting regional cuisines and local traditions. In many countries, particularly former British colonies, the meal shares some connection with traditional English Christmas fare, typically featuring roasted meats and various forms of pudding. Classic dishes such as Christmas pudding and Christmas cake evolved from these British traditions. However, Christmas dinner has been adapted and transformed by local cultures worldwide, incorporating indigenous ingredients, cooking methods, and culinary customs to create distinctive regional celebrations.

== Asia ==
=== India ===
Long-established Christian communities such as Goan Catholics traditionally feature pork and beef dishes as part of their main Christmas dinner. Popular dishes include pork vindaloo and sarapatel. For dessert, a traditional sweet called bebinca is often served.

In Kerala, home to India's largest Christian community, plum cake is a celebrated Christmas dessert. Families traditionally gather to cut the cake after midnight mass, a custom that has become an integral part of Kerala's Christmas celebrations. Wines made from grapes, pineapples, gooseberries, or other fruits are also consumed during the festivities.

=== Japan ===
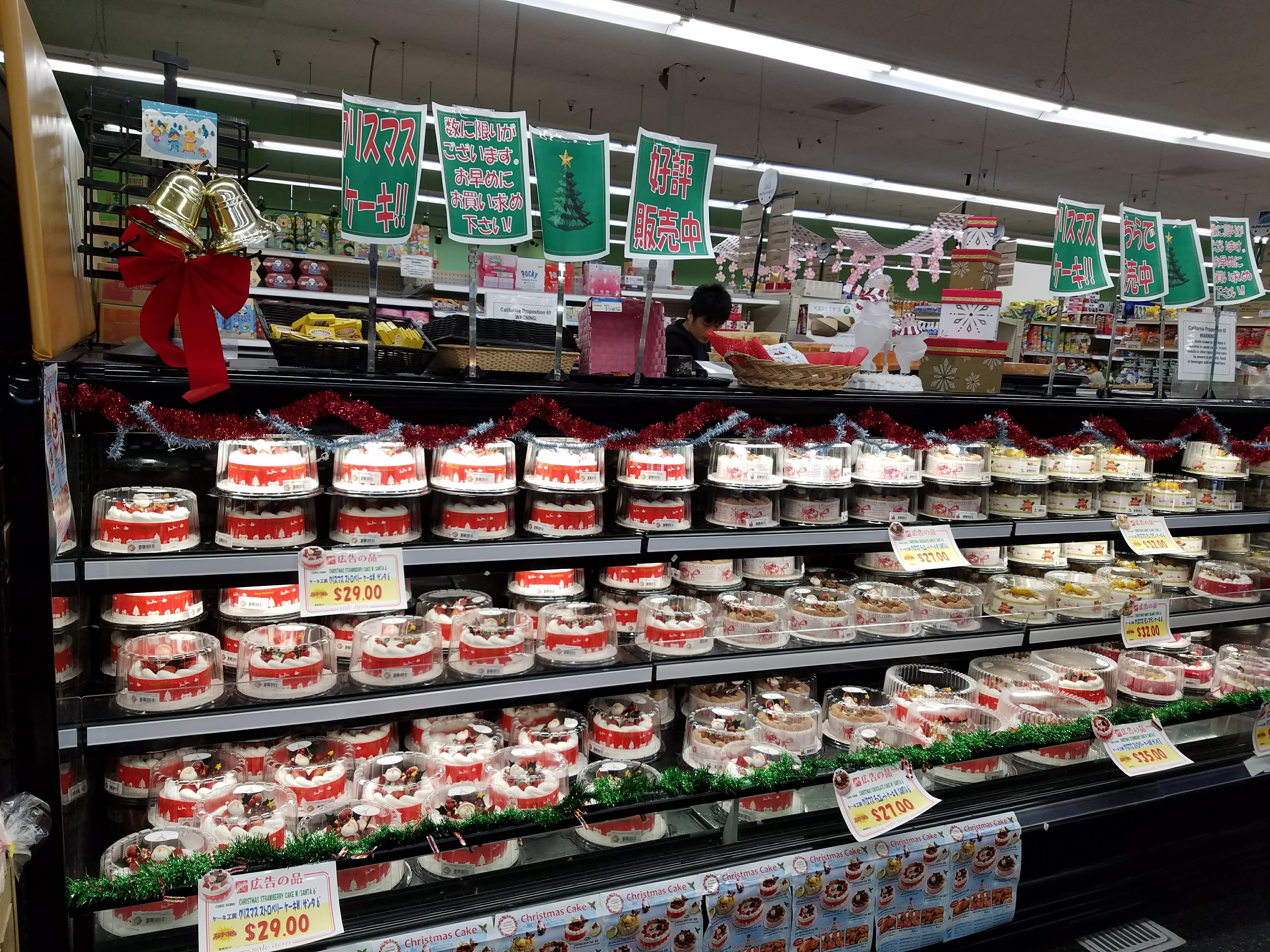
Japanese-style Christmas cakes in a display case at Nijiya Market

Japanese Christmas cake, a white sponge cake covered with cream and decorated with strawberries, is widely consumed during the Christmas season. Stollen cake, produced locally, is also readily available. A highly successful advertising campaign in the 1970s established eating at KFC around Christmas as a national custom. The restaurant's chicken meals have become so popular during the season that stores accept reservations months in advance.

=== Lebanon ===
Lebanese Christians celebrate Christmas with substantial family feasts, typically held on the evening of 24 December and at lunch on the 25th. Both meals bring the extended family together, with some households serving leftovers from the Christmas Eve dinner alongside the Christmas Day lunch. The traditional offering is sugar-coated almonds. Roast turkey is the most common main dish, often accompanied by roasted duck, Lebanese salad (Tabbouleh), and pastries such as honey cake. Beirut marks the season with elaborate Christmas parties, while Western-style poinsettias, community Christmas trees, and Christmas lights have become widely popular decorations.

=== Malaysia ===
On Christmas Eve, Malaysian Christians prepare various cakes and local foods for the celebration. Christmas dinner in Malaysia features a fusion of traditional Western cuisine and local indigenous flavors. The popularity of a large Christmas dinner is seen in the fact that major hotels in large cities offer extravagant Christmas buffets featuring this cultural blend.

=== Philippines ===
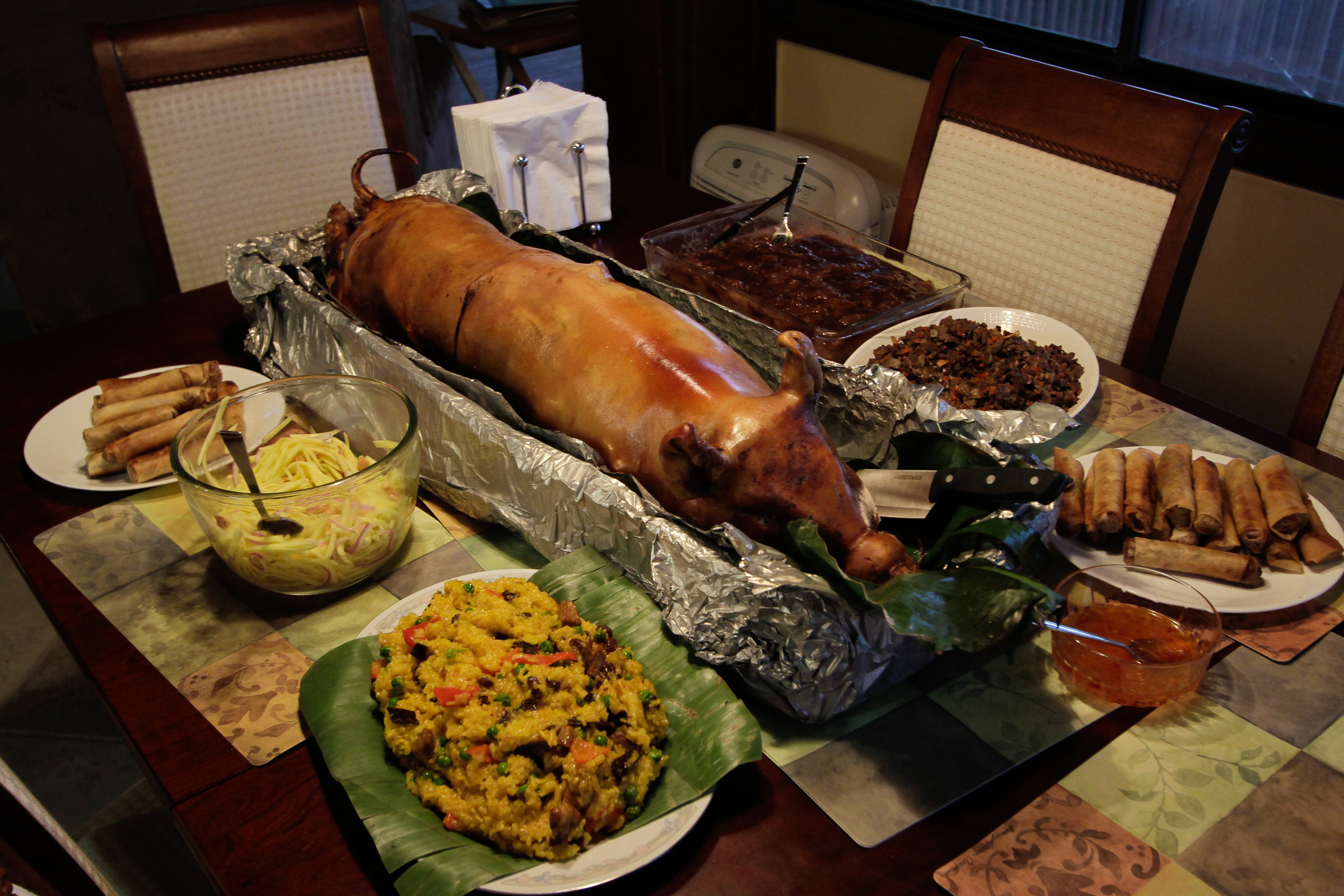
Typical traditional noche buena meal in the Philippines, with a lechón as the centerpiece

Christmas dinner in the Philippines is called Noche Buena, following Hispanic custom, and is traditionally held towards midnight on 24 December. This celebration usually follows the entire family's attendance at the late evening Mass called Misa de Gallo (Mass of the Rooster). The centerpiece of Noche Buena is often hamón, typically a cured leg of pork. This is customarily served alongside queso de bola, a ball of Edam cheese covered in red wax. Other ubiquitous dishes include pasta and, for dessert, fruit salad. The dinner is usually accompanied by tsokolate, or hot cocoa, made with pure, locally grown cacao beans. Some families prefer tsokolate prepared from tablea, pressed cocoa powder tablets that are either pure or slightly sweetened. Most foods served on Noche Buena are fresh and prepared on Christmas Eve itself. Middle-class and affluent families tend to prepare sumptuous feasts, while less well-off families opt for more economical celebrations. The organizing of even simple gatherings despite financial difficulties reflects the paramount importance of familial and communal unity in Filipino culture.

Common traditional dishes served for the main course include lechón, various types of pancit (noodles), Filipino spaghetti, hamonado, jamón, queso de bola, morcón, embutido, chicken galantina, almondigas (meatballs), paelya (arroz valenciana, bringhe), lumpia, menudo, mechado, caldereta, callos, chicken pastel, relyenong bangús (stuffed milkfish), lengua estofado, adobo, and various types of barbecue (inihaw). Nearly all of these dishes are eaten with white rice.

Meanwhile, desserts and side dishes include úbe halayá, turon, leche flan, macaroni salad, membrilyo, fruit salad, buko salad, crema de fruta, ensaymada, champorado, mango float, fruitcake, castañas (roasted chestnuts), and various kakanin (rice cakes) such as puto bumbong, bibingka, suman, biko, and sapin-sapin. Popular beverages include tsokolate as well as coffee, soda, wine, beer, other alcoholic drinks, and fruit juices.

This focus on family is common across all Filipino socioeconomic classes and ethnic groups that observe Christmas. Most, if not all, members from the branches or extended families within a clan are expected to partake of the Noche Buena. Relatives living abroad, especially OFWs (Overseas Filipino Workers), are strongly encouraged to return home for the occasion, as it is the most important Filipino Christian holiday of the year. Most families prefer to exchange Christmas presents immediately after dinner, contrary to the Western custom of opening presents on Christmas morning.

== Europe ==
=== Austria ===
In Austria, Christmas Eve marks the celebration of the end of the pre-Christmas fast. Christmas is primarily celebrated by Christians. Historically, Christmas Eve is the day when the tree is decorated and lit with real candles so that the Christkindl (Christ Child) may visit. Christmas Day is a national holiday in Austria, and most Austrians spend the day feasting with their families. Traditional foods include fried carp, Sachertorte, and Christmas biscuits (Lebkuchen and Weihnachtssterne), along with many other chocolate delicacies including edible Christmas ornaments. Christmas dinner typically features goose or ham, served with Gluhwein, Rumpunsch, and chocolate mousse.

=== Czech Republic ===
A traditional Christmas meal in the Czech Republic consists of fried carp and potato salad, eaten during Christmas dinner on the evening of 24 December. The meal is often accompanied by fish soup prepared from carp leftovers (head or bones), and traditional Czech dishes such as Kuba or Černá omáčka (Black sauce) made from dried fruits, nuts, wine, and gingerbread. Many households also prepare a variety of unique Christmas biscuits to offer to visitors. These are prepared many days before the feast and require considerable time to decorate. It is also common to hang wrapped chocolate sweets on the Christmas tree as decorations for children.

=== Denmark ===
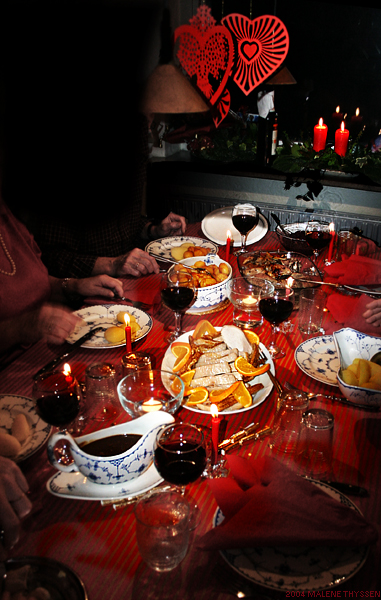
Danish Christmas dinner

In Denmark, the traditional Christmas meal served on 24 December consists, according to one representative study, of duck (66% of households surveyed), roast pork with crackling (43%), turkey (8%), or goose (7%). The figures total more than 100% because some families prepare multiple kinds of meat for Christmas dinner. The meat is served with boiled potatoes (some of which are caramelized, others roasted), red cabbage, and gravy. The main course is followed by dessert of Risalamande, rice pudding served with cherry sauce or strawberry sauce, often with a whole almond hidden inside. The lucky finder of the almond is entitled to an extra present, the almond gift. Traditional Christmas beverages include Gløgg (mulled wine) and special Christmas beers brewed for the season with typically high alcohol content.

=== Finland ===
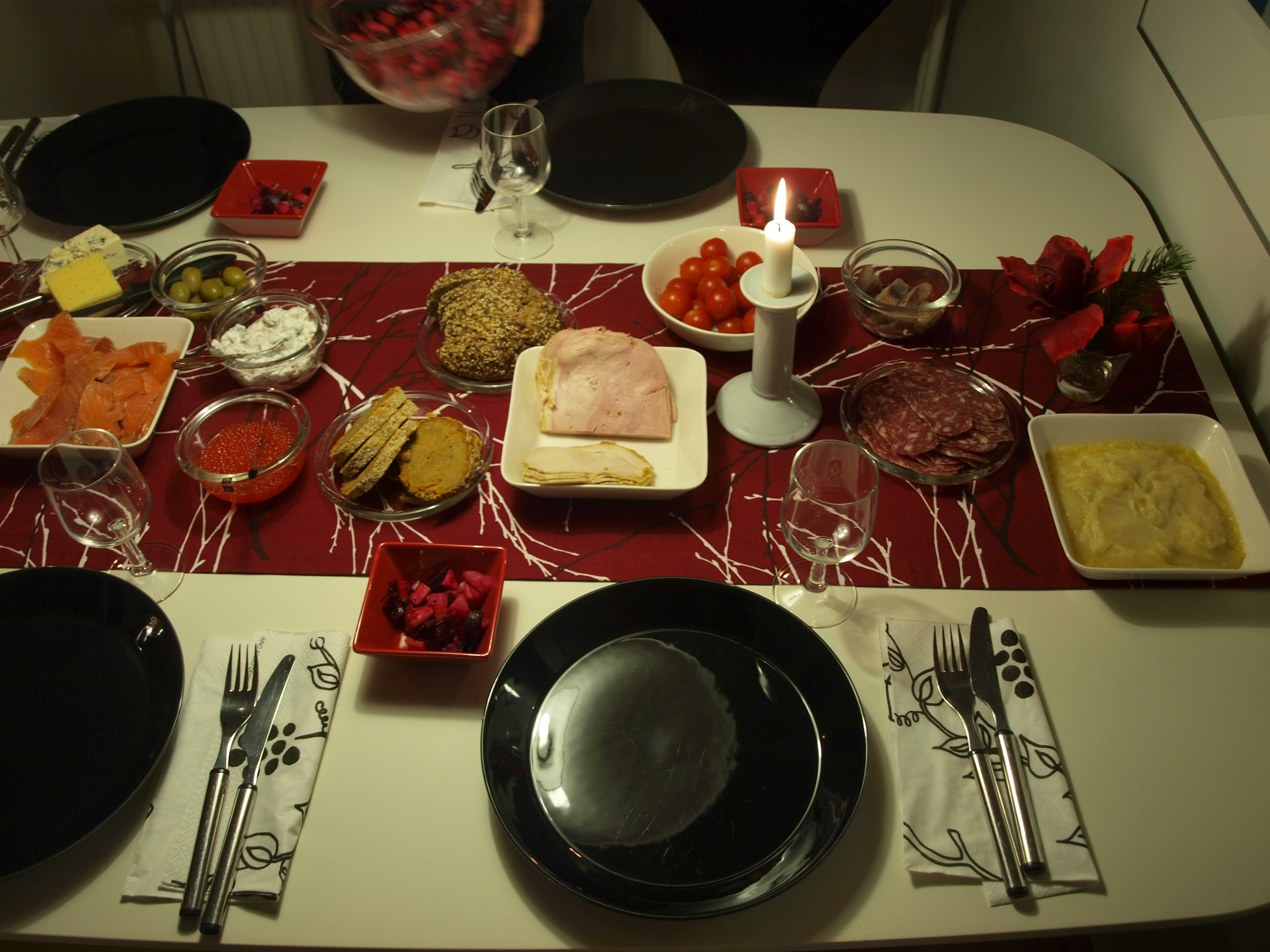
Finnish Christmas dinner

Joulupöytä (translated as "Christmas table") is the name of the traditional food board served at Christmas in Finland, similar to the Swedish smörgåsbord. It contains many different dishes, most of them typical for the season. The main dish is usually a large Christmas ham, eaten with mustard or bread along with the other dishes. Fish is also served, often lutefisk and gravlax or smoked salmon, and the ham is accompanied by different casseroles, usually featuring potatoes, rutabaga (swedes), or carrots. The traditional Christmas beverage is mulled wine (glögi in Finnish), which may be either alcoholic or non-alcoholic.

=== Germany ===
In Germany, the primary Christmas dishes are roast goose and roast carp, although suckling pig, duck, or venison may also be served. Typical side dishes include roast potatoes and various forms of cabbage such as kale, Brussels sprouts, and red cabbage. In some regions, Christmas dinner is traditionally served on Christmas Day rather than Christmas Eve. In such cases, dinner on Christmas Eve is a simpler affair, consisting of sausages (such as Bockwurst or Wiener) and potato salad. Sweets and Christmas pastries are customary and include marzipan, gingerbread (Lebkuchen), several types of bread, and various fruitcakes and fruited loaves such as Christstollen and Dresdener Stollen.

=== Italy ===
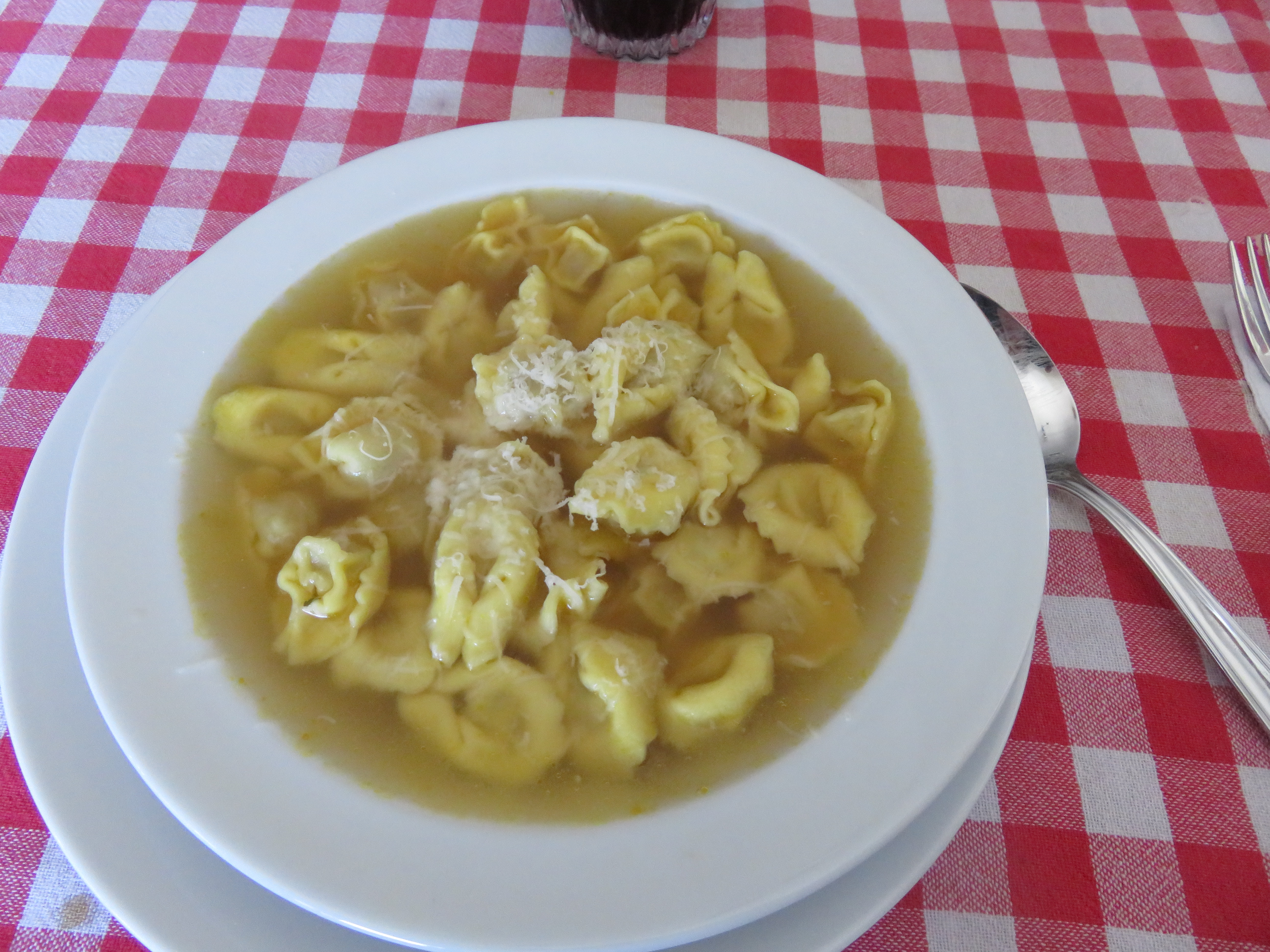
Cappelletti

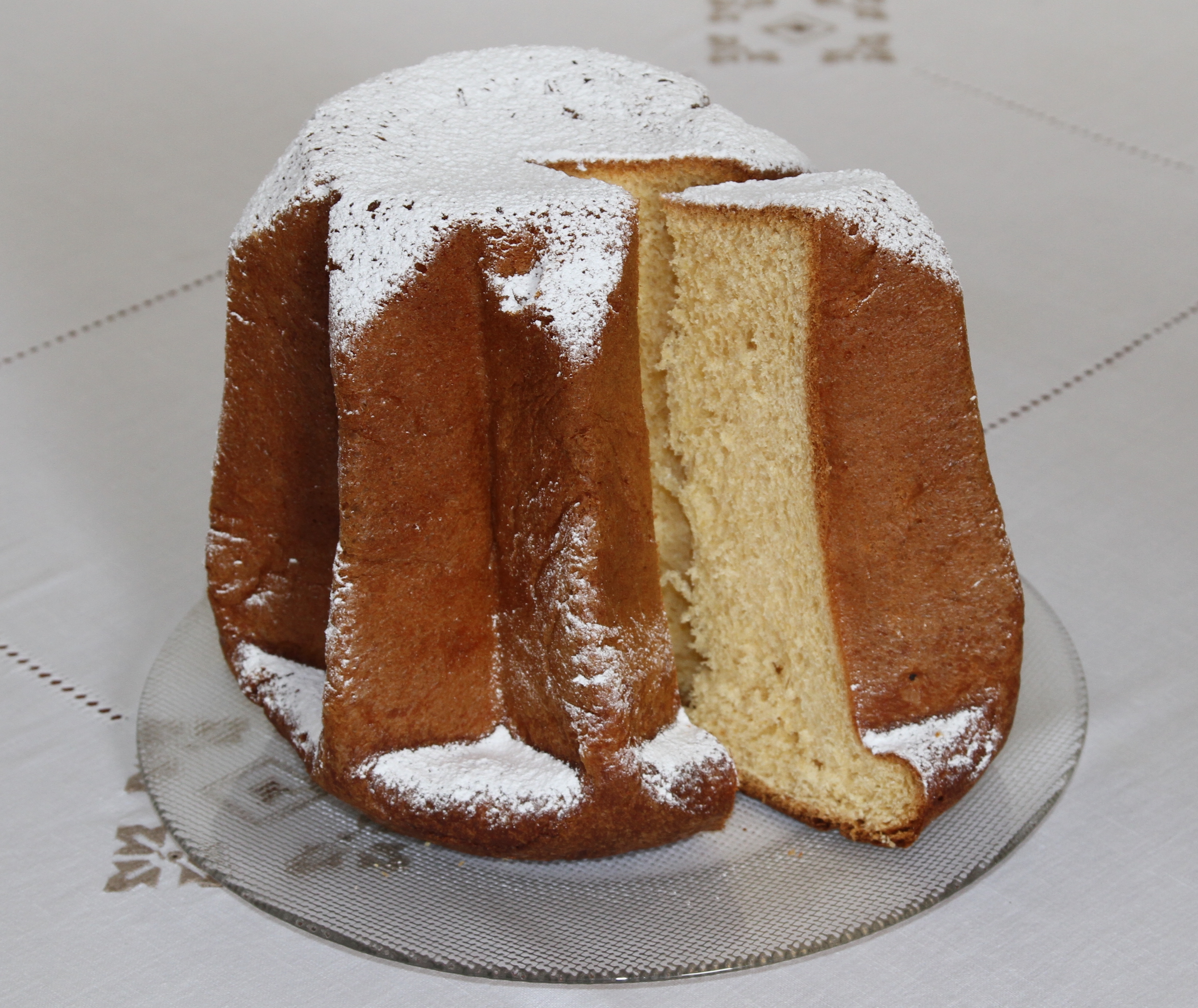
Pandoro

In Italy, the Christmas Eve meal is usually called cenone (literally "big dinner"). The culinary tradition differs between Northern and Southern Italy: the cenone is celebrated primarily in the South, while in the North, Christmas Eve is commonly a working day and the main event takes place at lunchtime on Christmas Day. According to tradition, the Christmas Eve dinner should not contain meat. A popular Christmas Day dish in Naples and Southern Italy is female eel, or capitone. A traditional Christmas Day dish from Northern Italy is capon (gelded chicken). Abbacchio is more common in Central Italy.

The Christmas Day dinner traditionally consists of typical Italian Christmas dishes such as agnolini, cappelletti, Pavese agnolotti, pandoro, panettone, torrone, panforte, struffoli, mustacciuoli, bisciola, cavallucci, veneziana, pizzelle, zelten, and others, depending on the regional cuisine. Christmas Day is celebrated with a family lunch consisting of different types of pasta and meat dishes, cheese, and local sweets.

Panettone, originally from Milan, is traditionally prepared and enjoyed for Christmas and New Year in Western, Southern, and Southeastern Europe, as well as in South America, Eritrea, Australia, the United States, and Canada. It is served in wedge shapes, cut vertically, and accompanied by sweet hot beverages or sweet wine such as Asti or Moscato d'Asti. In some regions of Italy, it is served with crema al mascarpone, a cream made by combining eggs, mascarpone, and a sweet liqueur.

Pandoro is an Italian sweet bread, most popular around Christmas and New Year. Typically a product of the city of Verona, Veneto, pandoro traditionally has an eight-pointed shape. It is often dusted with vanilla-scented icing sugar, said to resemble the snowy peaks of the Alps during Christmas. The first citation of a dessert clearly identified as pandoro dates to the 18th century.

=== Norway ===
In Norway, there are three main schools of traditional Christmas main meals, likely influenced by regional differences in available proteins. The eastern inland region, where the country is flat, was well-suited for raising pigs and growing grains. Along the mountainous western coast, sheep were better-suited livestock, and fish was readily available year-round. Turkey is a modern adoption likely related to extensive immigration to the United States in the early 1900s.

According to a survey from 2021, the percentage of Norwegians eating the traditional main meals was:

- 49% pork ribs or steak
- 35% pinnekjøtt, a type of lamb ribs
- 7% cod, unpreserved or boknafisk or lutefisk
- 7% turkey
- 4% vegetarian
- 4% undefined
- 4% rice porridge, often eaten as a mid-day meal or as part of a buffet
- 4% frozen pizza

=== Portugal ===
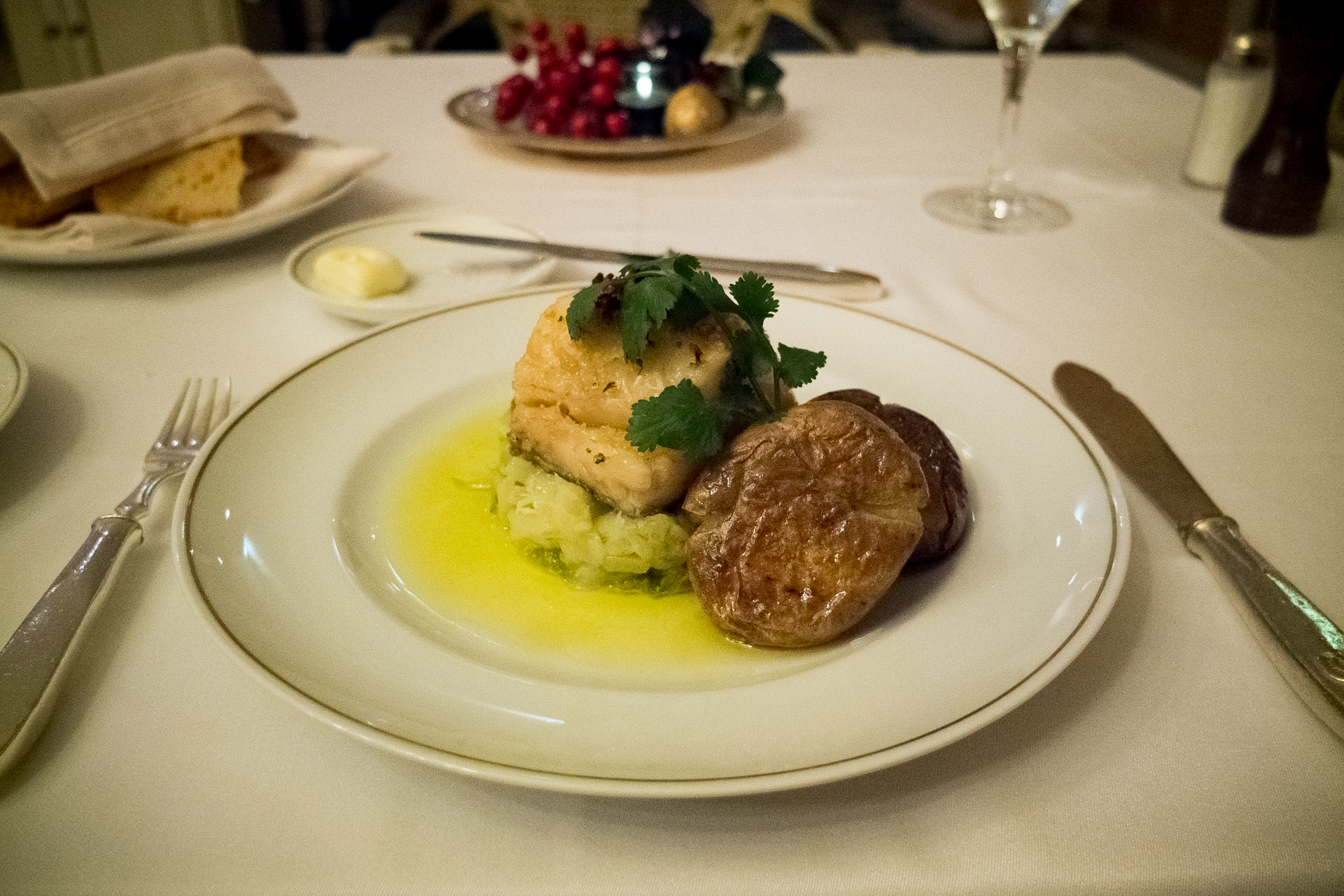
Traditional Portuguese Christmas dinner: cod with potatoes and cabbage, drizzled with olive oil

Traditionally in Portugal, the family gathers around the table on Christmas Eve to eat boiled dried-salted cod accompanied by boiled cabbage or greens (varying with what is available in the garden), boiled potatoes, boiled onions, boiled eggs, and chickpeas. Sometimes a simple dressing is made with onions, garlic, or parsley. This meal is accompanied by generous amounts of olive oil.

There are variations across the country, and traditional options include turkey and the famous Portuguese bacalhau. Many regions serve octopus (and possibly pork, depending on the locale) for lunch on the 25th.

=== Spain ===
In Spanish, Christmas Eve is called "Nochebuena," literally translated as "Good Night." In Spain, it is celebrated with a large family feast eaten late in the evening, often lasting a couple of hours; some families attend midnight mass before or after the meal. Christmas Eve is a time for celebrating in neighborhood bars and cafes and around the table with family and friends. It is a time for gift exchanges, though gift-giving is mainly performed on Epiphany, which occurs on 6 January.

In medieval Catalan cuisine, poultry was served for Christmas dinner, and other dishes with salsa de pago were followed by a course of lamb and bacon stew. The last course was formatge torrador (similar to provoleta in modern Argentinian cuisine), neula, and clarea (also called "white sangria", similar to hippocras).

=== Sweden ===
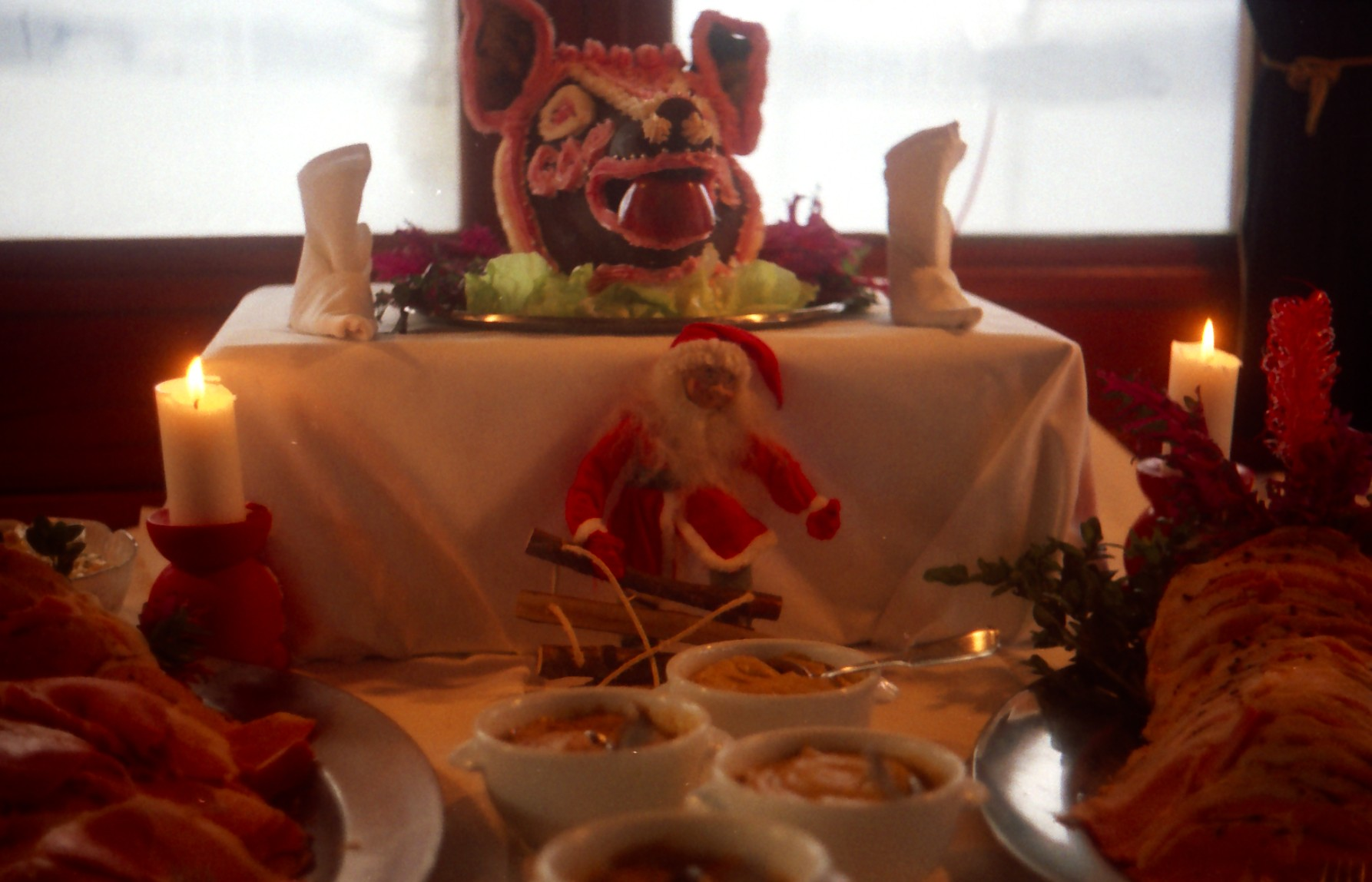
The Swedish Julbord sometimes features decorated pig heads.

The Swedish Christmas dinner, or Julbord, often consists of five or more courses. The first three courses feature a variety of fish, usually different types of pickled herring and salmon, smoked salmon, eaten with boiled potatoes or crisp bread and lutfisk. The fourth course comprises cold cuts of meat, with Christmas ham being the most important. Smoked sausages, brawn, apple sauce, and leverpastej are also common. The fifth course consists of warm dishes such as meatballs, small fried sausages, and Janssons frestelse. Finally, a cheese plate and dessert plate are served. The most popular dessert is rice pudding (risgrynsgröt) with a whole almond hidden inside. The finder of the almond is expected to get married before next Christmas. In some homes, the courses are served buffet-style, where all family members can select food in any order.

Common drinks include Christmas beer, julmust, and snaps.

=== United Kingdom ===
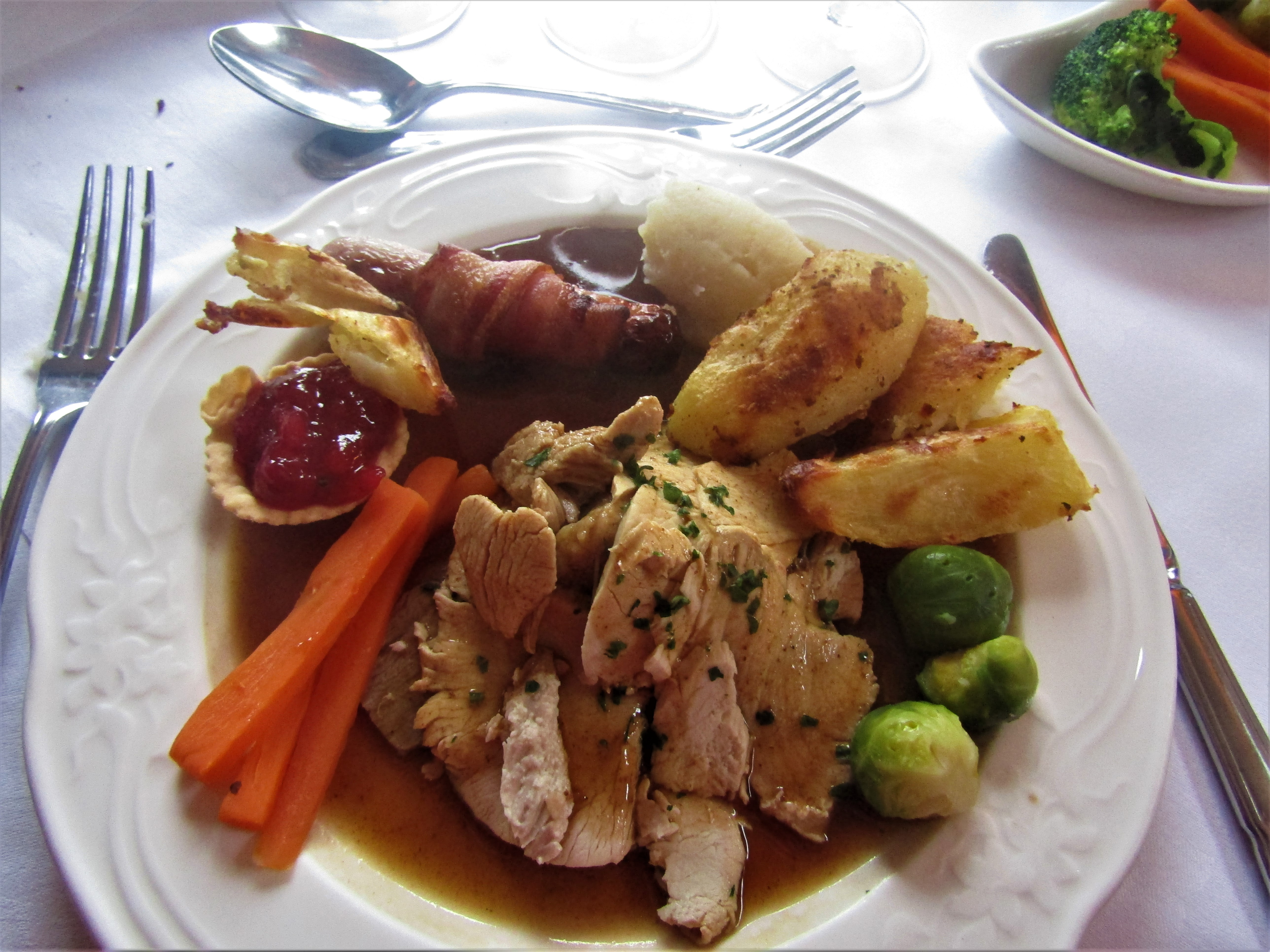
British Christmas dinner

Christmas dinner in the United Kingdom usually consists of roasted turkey, stuffing, gravy, pigs in blankets, bread sauce, cranberry sauce or redcurrant jelly, roast potatoes, and vegetables (particularly Brussels sprouts, broccoli, carrots, and parsnips). Yorkshire puddings may feature, but are historically served with roast beef. Dessert typically features Christmas pudding, mince pies (both served with brandy butter, custard, or cream), or trifle.

In 2021, it was estimated that nine million turkeys were consumed at Christmas in the United Kingdom. This represented a halving of turkey consumption since 1996, as younger adults increasingly opt for alternatives. Pork, beef, chicken, goose, and duck are also popular alternatives.

In England, throughout the 16th and 17th centuries, goose or capon was commonly served, and the wealthy sometimes dined upon peacock and swan. The turkey appeared on Christmas tables in England in the 16th century. The 16th-century farmer Thomas Tusser noted that by 1573, turkeys were commonly served at English Christmas dinners. The tradition of turkey at Christmas spread rapidly throughout England in the 17th century, and it also became common to serve goose, which remained the predominant roast until the Victorian era. A famous English Christmas dinner scene appears in Charles Dickens' A Christmas Carol (1843), where Scrooge sends Bob Cratchitt a large turkey. The pudding course of a British Christmas dinner may often be Christmas pudding, which dates from medieval England. Trifle, mince pies, Christmas cake, or a yule log are also popular. By the 21st century, some British citizens have been changing their Christmas dinner traditions, with a growing number selecting vegetarian and vegan versions of traditional UK Christmas meals.

== North America ==
=== Canada ===
In English-speaking Canada, Christmas dinner is similar to that of Britain. Traditional Christmas dinner features turkey with stuffing, mashed potatoes, gravy, cranberry sauce, and vegetables. A Christmas dinner is typically very similar to a Thanksgiving dinner. Other types of poultry, roast beef, or ham are also used. Pumpkin or apple pie, raisin pudding, Christmas pudding, or fruitcake are staples for dessert. Eggnog, a milk-based punch often infused with alcohol, is also popular around the holiday season. Other Christmas items include Christmas cookies, butter tarts, and shortbread, which are traditionally baked before the holidays and served to visiting friends at Christmas and New Year parties, as well as on Christmas Day.

In French-speaking Canada, traditions may be more like those of France. (See Réveillon.) Other ethnic communities may continue to use old-world traditions as well.

=== United States ===
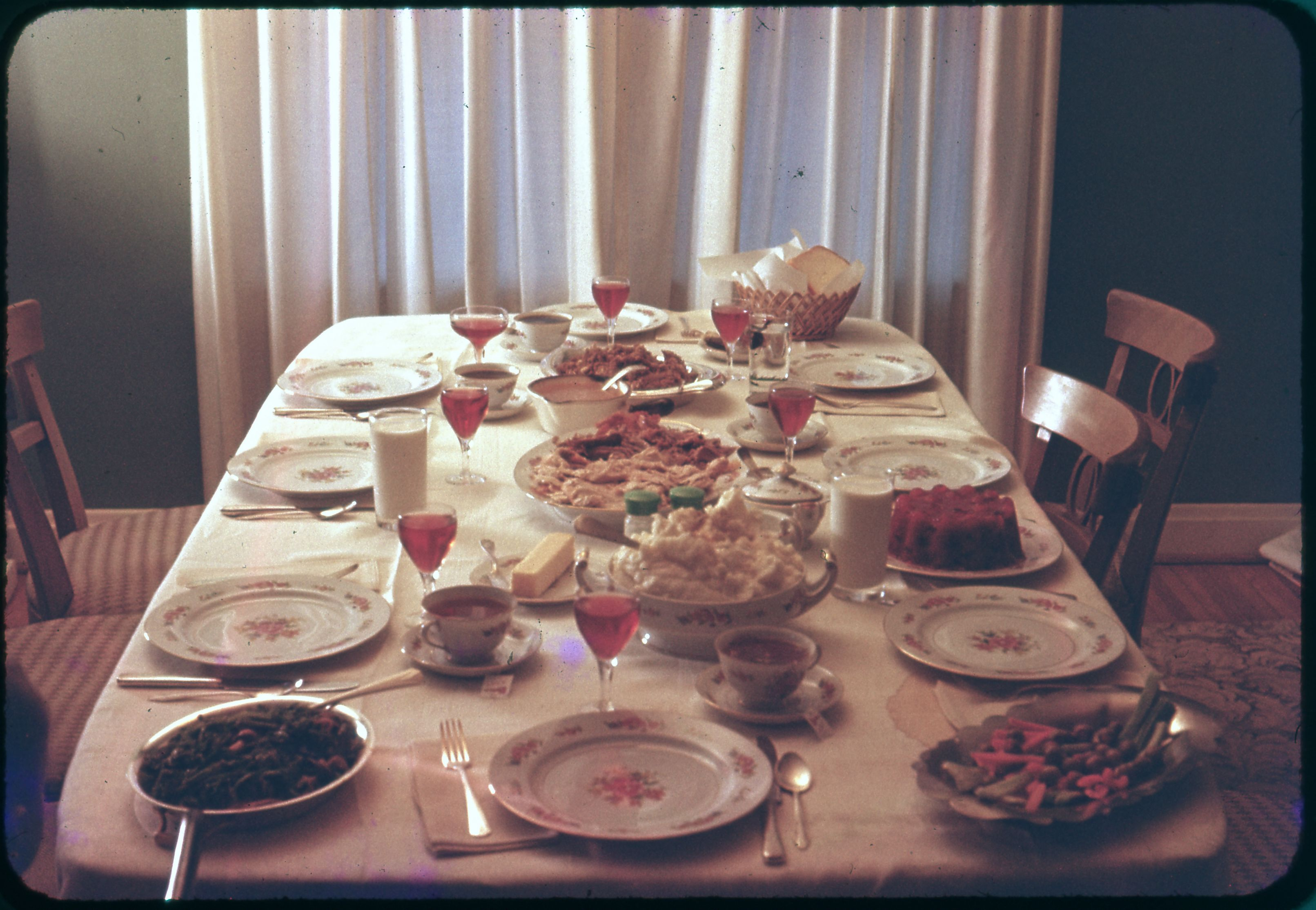
An Ohio household's Christmas dinner, 1959

Christmas traditions in the United States have eclectic origins. Traditions from the United Kingdom are maintained in most states, along with others celebrated due to many years of influence from Europe (Spain, Scandinavia, Italy, France, the Netherlands, Germany) and more recent influences from people of Latin American and Caribbean origin in states such as Florida. Therefore, the substrate of the meal is usually British in origin: roasted root vegetables as a side dish, mashed potatoes, gravy, and a centerpiece of stuffed roasted fowl (pheasant, goose, duck, or turkey) or an expensive cut of roasted beef or beef Wellington. In the South, an area with a high concentration of people of UK extraction from centuries past, Christmas is the time when many variations on country ham or Christmas ham are served. This is an older British tradition that predates the Victorian tradition of Dickens and his turkey, going back to medieval England and brought by poorer classes who could not afford the fashionable turkey served among wealthier men in the Stuart era. Cookies of many kinds have been present in America for hundreds of years and are often gingerbread, snickerdoodles, or sugar cookies baked throughout December and fashioned into many shapes and figures.

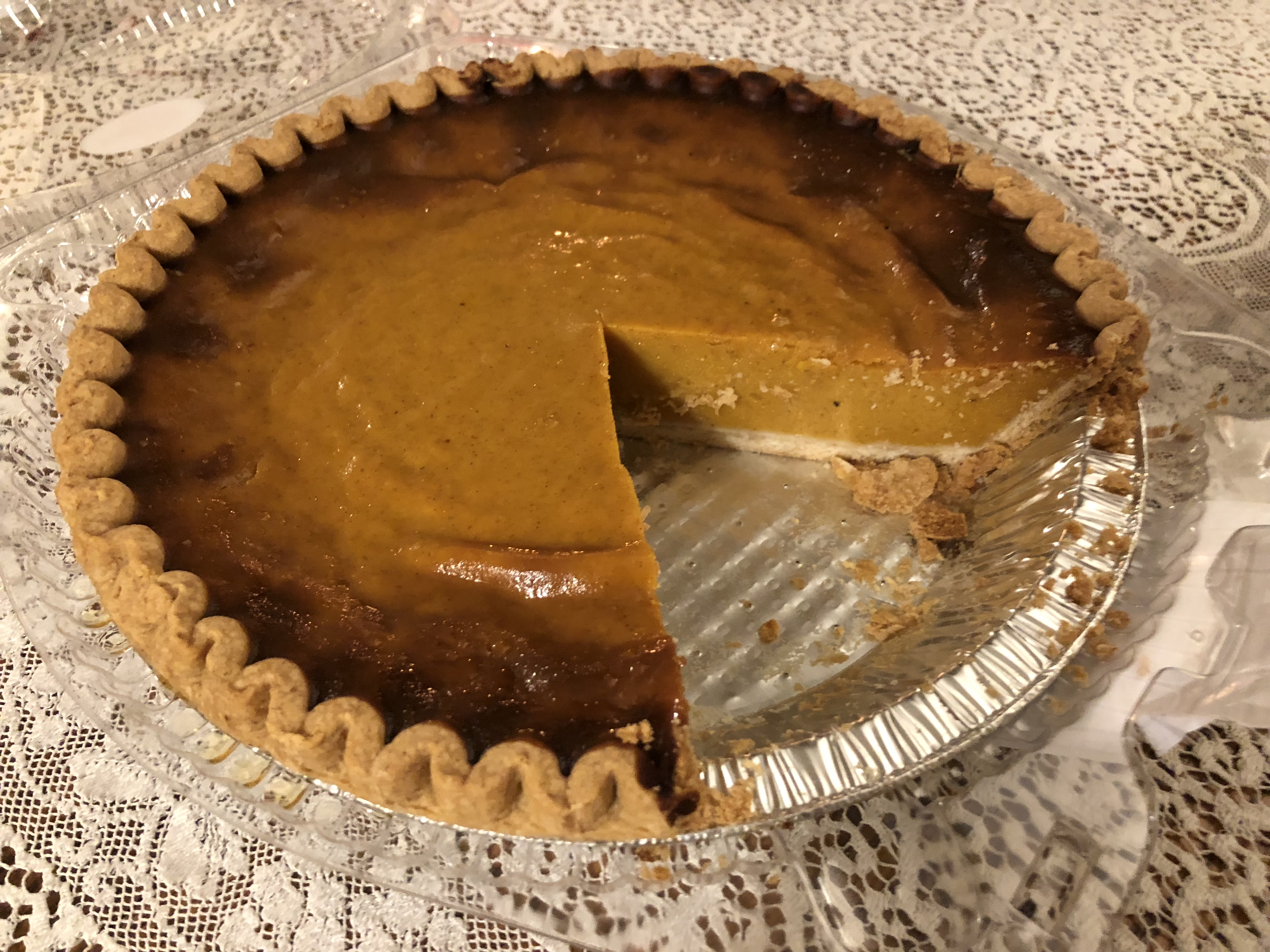
A pumpkin pie served for Christmas dinner

Fruitcake serves more as a national joke, often lampooned as an unwanted Christmas gift. The comic Johnny Carson once quipped, "The worst Christmas gift is fruitcake… There is only one fruitcake in the entire world, and people keep sending it to each other, year after year." Many foreigners are skeptical of this, but there is some truth to it: Manitou Springs, Colorado, holds an annual event in which unwanted fruitcakes are tossed in a contest to see who can throw the "gift" the farthest, with locals building trebuchets and contraptions that are forbidden to have electric motors. An elderly gentleman from Tecumseh, Michigan, once made national news when he revealed he still had a fruitcake his great-grandmother baked in 1878, thus over 130 years old. As of 2018, the same fruitcake is believed to be still in the care of one of his grandchildren, proving Mr. Carson had a point.

Alcohol and cocktails (alcoholic and non-alcoholic) of all kinds are staples for both Christmas parties and family gatherings, where harder drinking is done among adults while children usually receive soft drinks or non-alcoholic versions of their parents' drinks, such as the Shirley Temple. A typical menu would include any combination of planter's punch, Kentucky bourbon and its cocktails, wines from California, Washington, Virginia, or New York of varying vintages meant to complement the meal, Prosecco from Italy, hard cider from New England and California, wassail, Puerto Rican or Jamaican rum, champagne and other domestic sparkling white wines, and for individual cocktails, the alcoholic version of eggnog, the poinsettia, and the Puerto Rican coquito, a cocktail composed of large amounts of coconut milk and rum.

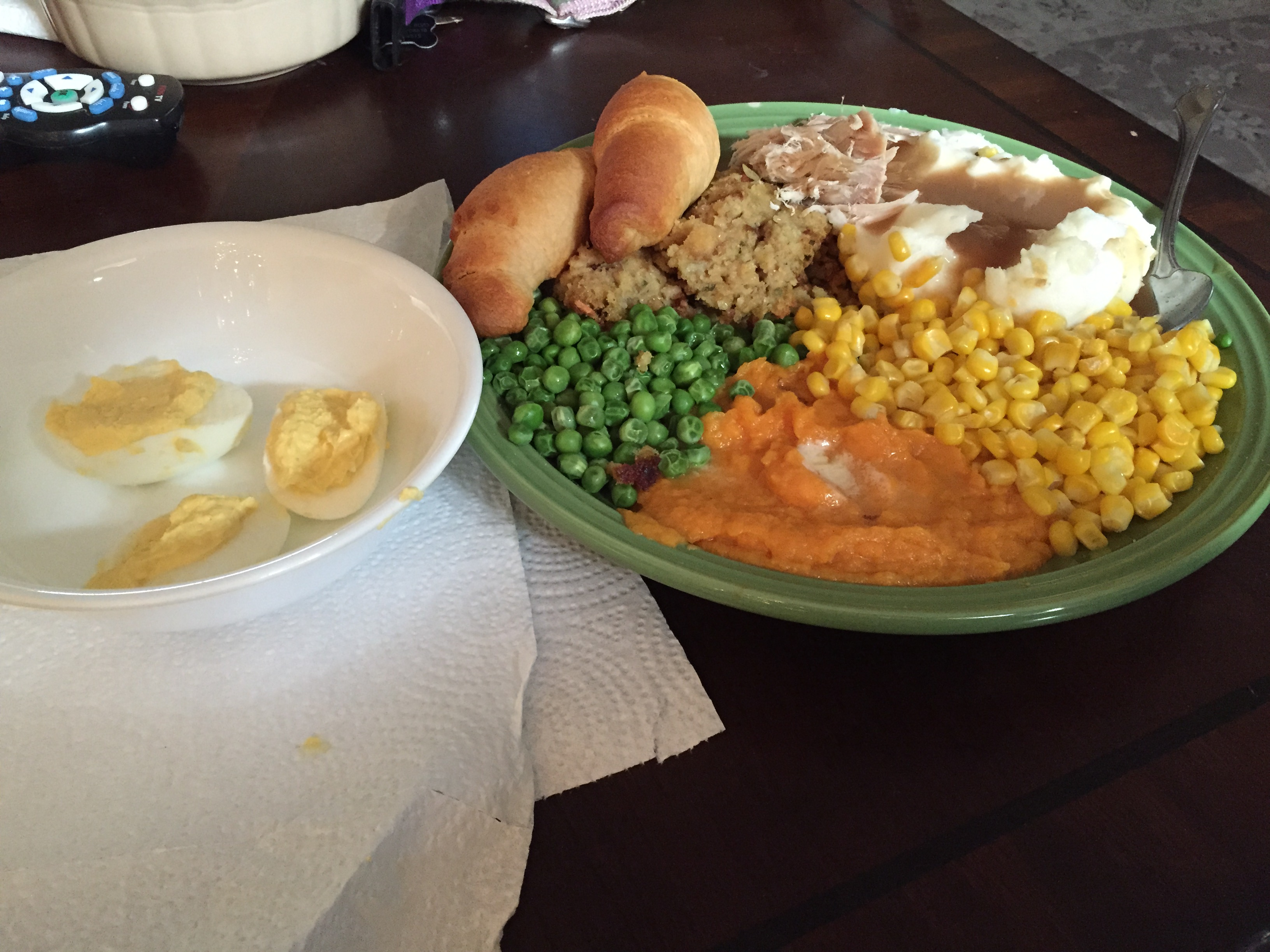
A Christmas dinner from 2017, which includes deviled eggs, peas, corn, stuffing, turkey, mashed potatoes, croissant rolls and mashed sweet potatoes.

West of the Mississippi, Mexicans have had a great influence on how the meal is prepared, including roasting corn in its husk and serving biscochitos.

Further regional meals offer diversity. Virginia features oysters, ham pie, and fluffy biscuits, a nod to its English 17th-century founders. The Upper Midwest includes dishes from predominantly Scandinavian backgrounds such as lutefisk and mashed rutabaga or turnip. In the Lowcountry region, rice is often served instead of potatoes, and on the Gulf Coast, shrimp and other seafood are usual appetizers, while Charlotte Russe chilled in a bed of Lady Fingers (called just Charlotte) is a traditional dessert, along with pumpkin and pecan pies. In some rural areas, game meats like elk or quail may grace the table, often prepared with old recipes similar to foodstuffs likely served at the tables of early American settlers on their first Christmases.

An Italian-American meal for Christmas Eve can be the Feast of the Seven Fishes. Panettone and struffoli are favored desserts in such cases. It is a common tradition among many Jewish Americans to eat American Chinese food on Christmas because these are often the only establishments open on the holiday in many cities.

== Oceania ==
=== Australia and New Zealand ===
Christmas dinner, although eaten at lunchtime, in Australia and in New Zealand, is based on traditional English versions. However, due to Christmas falling in the heat of the Southern Hemisphere's summer, meats such as ham, turkey, and chicken are sometimes served cold with cranberry sauce, accompanied by side salads or roast vegetables. Barbecues are also a popular way of avoiding the heat of the oven. Seafood such as prawns, lobster, oysters, and crayfish are common, as are barbecued cuts of steak or chicken breasts, drumsticks, and wings. In summer, Australians and Kiwis are also fond of pavlova, a dessert composed of fruit such as strawberries, kiwifruit, and passionfruit atop a baked meringue with whipped cream. Trifle is also a favorite in Australia at Christmas. Fresh fruits of the season include cherries and mangoes, plums, nectarines, and peaches. Introduced by Italian Australians, panettone is widely available in shops, particularly in Sydney and Melbourne.

== South America ==
=== Brazil ===
In Brazil, the Christmas meal (traditionally served on Christmas Eve) offers large quantities of food, including a wide variety of dishes such as roast turkey, fresh vegetables, fruits, and Brazil nuts. Accompanying these are bowls of colorful rice and platters filled with ham and fresh salad (sometimes cold potato salad is also served). Some parts of Brazil also feature roast pork or chicken. Red wine, white wine, and apple cider are common alcoholic beverages. Other Christmas items include a variety of desserts such as lemon tart, nut pie, chocolate cake, and Panettone.

=== Peru ===
On Christmas Eve (Noche Buena), the extended family gathers for a dinner of roast turkey and white rice seasoned with garlic. Roast potatoes and cooked sweetened apple puree are often served as well. The main dessert is panettone, usually accompanied by a cup of thick hot chocolate. Less common desserts include a special marzipan made from Brazil nuts (due to the scarcity and expense of almonds in Peru) and assorted bowls with raisins and peanuts. At midnight, a toast is made, and good wishes and hugs are exchanged. A designated person places the Child Jesus figure in the Nativity scene. Then, the family members take their seats in the dining room while singing Christmas Carols.

=== Uruguay ===
In Uruguay, Christmas dinner is served on Christmas Eve. The holiday is celebrated with a large family feast where traditionally asado and other dishes such as vitello tonnato are eaten, along with salads like Olivier salad. However, the consumption of picada (a fusion of Italian antipasto and Spanish tapas) on Christmas Eve and of asado at Christmas lunch on the 25th has become widespread. For dessert, panettone and turrón are eaten, which were introduced to Uruguayan cuisine by Spanish and Italian immigrants in the 19th and 20th centuries.

At midnight, a toast is made with champagne or cider.

== See also ==
- List of Christmas dishes
- List of dining events
