= Truffled turkey =

Stuffed turkey dish

Detail of Porc frais. Dinde truffée [Fresh pork. Truffled turkey], c. 1830

A truffled turkey (French, dinde truffée) is one that has been stuffed with truffles.

The use of truffle in stuffing turkeys became established in France by the late-18th century, where it was held in high regard among the nation's elite. The dish is recorded being served across the world; in America, in hotels in England and Vietnam, and at a 1898 banquet celebrating the inauguration of the First Philippine Republic. Preparation required large quantities of truffles, which ultimately led to truffled turkey becoming rare when truffle prices rose in the early 20th century.

== History ==
Butchered turkeys contain large cavities, which European cooks have filled with stuffing since the bird was introduced to the continent. A potential early reference to turkeys stuffed with truffles appears in the French chef Vincent La Chapelle's The Modern Cook (1733). He calls for a turkey stuffed with "green truffles", although it is unclear whether these are meant to reference fresh truffles, or some other fungi or vegetable. By the end of the century, truffled turkey had become established among France's elite, (Note: A record from 1784 has a duke purchasing turkey with truffles for 21 livres) and in the early 19th century Grimod de La Reynière could describe wagons in the late winter being loaded with truffled turkey to be shipped out from Strasbourg.

19th-century illustration

By 1825, Brillat-Savarin was mentioning truffled turkey as particularly esteemed among the French cultural elite: "in our highest gastronomical society, when politics are obliged to give way to dissertations on matters of taste, what is desired, what is looked out for at the second course? A truffled turkey. A truffled turkey!" Brillat-Savarin loved the dish. Imagining he was addressing Adam and Eve in their garden without truffled turkey, he remarked: "I weep for you", and asked "You first parents of the human race... who ruined yourself for an apple, what might you not have done for a truffled turkey?" Recipes could call for great amounts of truffles—"it takes nearly two or three pounds of truffles to stuff a turkey well", wrote the Scottish journalist Eneas Sweetland Dallas in 1877, and some American recipes called for four pounds (almost two kilograms). While truffles were not as expensive as they are today, they were still not cheap, (Note: Dallas calls the dish a luxury, pricing truffles at "twelve to fifteen shillings a pound".) and these large amounts have been viewed with suspicion by the historian Andrew F. Smith. Perhaps, Smith writes, larger recipes were printed to signal status rather than to be used, or maybe ingredients passed off as truffles would have been used.

Outside France, truffled turkey is recorded being consumed across countries around the turn of the 20th century. In the Philippines, truffled turkey was served at a banquet commemorating the 1898 inauguration of the First Philippine Republic, "a la Manilloise". While the only remaining record of the dish is a name on a menu, according to the chef Gene Gonzalez, the dish would have been "lightly precooked in garlic, spices and a little vinegar the day before". On the day, chefs would have braised the turkey "in a kawa with gravy made from necks, liver, gizzards, and flavoured with wine, capers, and olives", later subjecting it further "light braising over a wood fire on a steel vat or kawa". Truffled turkey was being served around the same time at the Hôtel de la Paix in Saigon in 1903, and Escoffier was serving the dish in London at the Carlton Hotel as part of hotel's 1912 Christmas menu.

Truffled turkey became rare during the early 20th century with an increase in truffle prices. The dish has sometimes reappeared; Jane Grigson mentions it in her 1975 The Mushroom Feast, where the truffles are sliced and raw, and dinde truffée a la Manilloise was prepared in 1998 in a recreation of the 1898 banquet, in commemoration of the Philippine's centennial.

== See also ==
- Roast turkey
- Turkey as food

== Sources ==
- Aron, Jean-Paul (1975) [1973 in French as Le Mangeur du XIXe siècle]. The Art of Eating in France: Manners and Menus in the Nineteenth Century. Translated by Rootes, Nina. New York: Harper & Row. ISBN 0-06-010134-2.
- Brillat-Savarin, Jean Anthelme (1826). Physiologie du goût [The Physiology of Taste] (in French) (1st ed.). Paris: Auguste Sautelet.
- Crumpacker, Bunny (2006). The Sex Life of Food: When Body and Soul Meet to Eat. New York: Thomas Dunne Books. ISBN 0-312-34207-1.
- David, Elizabeth (2018) [2003]. Elizabeth David's Christmas. London: Penguin Books. ISBN 978-0-7181-7850-5.
- Fernandez, Doreen G; Ocampo, Ambeth R (November 2001). "Grande Cuisine in the Philippines". Petits Propos Culinaires. 68.
- Fernandez, Doreen (1994). Tikim: Essays on Philippine Food and Culture. Pasig, Metro Manila: Anvil Publishing. ISBN 971-27-0383-5.
- Forster, Robert (1971). The House of Saulx-Tavanes: Versailles and Burgundy, 1700–1830. Baltimore, Maryland & London: The John Hopkins Press. ISBN 0-8018-1247-X.
- Grigson, Jane (1978) [1975]. The Mushroom Feast. Harmondsworth, Middlesex: Penguin Books. ISBN 0-14-046273-2.
- Peters, Erica J. (2012). Appetites and Aspirations in Vietnam: Food and Drink in the Long Nineteenth Century. Lanham, Maryland: AltaMira Press. ISBN 978-0-7591-2075-4.
- Smith, Andrew F. (2006). The Turkey: An American Story. Chicago, Illinois: University of Illinois Press. ISBN 0-252-03163-6.
- Wheaton, Barbara Ketcham (1996) [1983]. Savoring the Past: The French Kitchen and Table from 1300 to 1789. New York: Scribner. ISBN 0-684-81857-4.
