= The Taste of Conquest =

2007 non-fiction book by Michael Krondl

- Author: Michael Krondl
- Genre: Food history
- Publisher: Ballantine Books
- Publication date: 2007
- Publication place: New York
- ISBN: 978-0-345-48083-5

The Taste of Conquest: The Rise and Fall of the Three Great Cities of Spice is a 2007 food history book by the food writer and former-chef Michael Krondl, published by Ballantine Books.

== Literary context ==
Several books, scholarly and popular, had been released on the history of spices in the years leading up to and following the publication of The Taste of Conquest. These included The Scents of Eden: A History of the Spice Trade in 1998 by Charles Corn, Dangerous Tastes: The Story of Spices in 2000 by Andrew Dalby, Spice: The History of a Temptation in 2004 by Jack Turner, The Spice Route: A History in 2005 by John Keay, and Out of the East: Spices and the Medieval Imagination in 2008 by Paul Freedman.

== Contents ==
In The Taste of Conquest, Krondl attempts to explain why demand for spices shifted in Europe in the medieval and early modern period, through the lens of the European port cities of Venice, Lisbon and Amsterdam which were successively prominent in the spice trade across the period. Several explanations are given: the introduction of new spices to Europe as trade routes opened up (e.g. cinnamon when Dutch merchants traded with Indonesia), beliefs in Galenic theory of humorism, and of nutritional benefits in the 16th and 17th centuries. Broadly, the book argues that "the origins of globalization can be traced directly to the spice trade".

The book is broken into three chapters, each dedicated to tracking the rise and fall in standing of a city. The chapters are framed around an opening account of Krondl visiting each city and other relevant locales (e.g. Cochin in India, Baltimore in the US, and Batavia, Dutch East Indies around the modern site of Jakarta, Indonesia), reporting in a journalistic style on how spices are now consumed and his encounters with inhabitants. Throughout each chapter, Krondl relates the historical account to his modern experiences. Substantial attention is given to debunking, addressing beliefs such as all spices being inordinately expensive to most people in the Middle Ages—Krondl instead states that spices such as pepper were accessible to large segments of the population.

Although the book is framed around the perspective of European consumption, the book contains descriptions of the spice trade outside this environment. Such commentary includes mention of the ways Asia dominated spice consumption during the period, and how the Portuguese took control of existing spice routes that had been run within Asia for centuries by Muslims out of north India.

== Reception ==
The book received strong praise from food historian Ken Albala, who described the book as "a fine example of how popular history writing can be rigorous and entertaining at the same time." Albala lauded the book's efforts at debunking as "almost always on target", noting approvingly Krondl's position that food in the medieval period was not "smothered in spices" but instead similar to spice levels served in modern Indian restaurants, and his conclusion that some spices were not prohibitively expensive to most people. Such efforts received a cooler reception in reviews in the journals Food, Culture & Society and Gastronomica. In the former, historian Alison A Smith described the positions as contrary to the existing scholarship in food history, citing the lack of supporting quantitative evidence as a case of Krondl doing "himself and the reader a great disservice". In Gastronomica, the independent culinary historian Clifford A Wright criticised the analogy to Indian restaurants as incorrect, describing it as "one of the most ridiculous criticisms [of academics] I’ve ever read", and "[smacking] of anti-intellectualism". Wright also described Krondl's correction that spices were not used as a preservative as being "something of a strawman", recalling the statement as only having been made by one historian, "almost as a throwaway line".

The topic of academia was raised in several reviews. Albala speculated some historians may take issue with Krondl's "nitpicking", "especially since he is drawing from the works of recent historians to do so", but viewed Krondl's journalistic travel accounts and interviews as the most valuable part of the book, stating "it really does work as history". A different impression was given in Kirkus Reviews, which concluded their review of the book with the words "Trying to do too much, he produces a loose, unscholarly text that many will find difficult to digest." The assessment of the book as unduly critical of historians was repeated throughout Wright's review. Wright found many of Krondl's criticisms of academic theories unfair and viewed his review of the literature as inadequate, justifying this with what Wright gave as several errors and omissions such as spices not travelling through Mecca on their way to Europe, rates of pepper imports, and the lack of mention of the Mamluk Sultanate of Egypt. Smith described The Taste of Conquest as "not a scholarly book", even as much of it was said to be valuable and compelling to a popular audience. Contrary to Albala's assessment of the interaction of past and present as "seamless", Smith said the approach could "often be distracting" even as it sometimes led to "great insight".

== See also ==
- Sweet Invention

== Sources ==
- Albala, Ken (April 2009). "Michael Krondl. The Taste of Conquest: The Rise and Fall of the Three Great Cities of Spice". The American Historical Review. 114 (2). doi:10.1086/ahr.114.2.474.
- Smith, Alison A (2009). "The Taste of Conquest: The Rise and Fall of the Three Great Cities of Spice by Michael Krondl". Food, Culture & Society. 12 (3). doi:10.2752/175174409X432085.
- "The Taste of Conquest: The Rise and Fall of the Three Great Cities of Spice". Kirkus Reviews. 1 September 2007. Archived from the original on 30 September 2015.
- Wright, Clifford A (August 2008). "Review: The Taste of Conquest: The Rise and Fall of the Three Great Cities of Spice, by Michael Krondl". Gastronomica. 8 (3). doi:10.1525/gfc.2008.8.3.110.
