= Sweet Invention =

2011 non-fiction book by Michael Krondl

- Author: Michael Krondl
- Publication date: 2011
- ISBN: 978-1-55652-954-2

Sweet Invention: A History of Dessert is a 2011 food history book by the food writer and former-chef Michael Krondl, published by Chicago Review Press.

== Contents ==
The book details the histories of the desserts from India, where sugar was first refined, into the Middle East, Italy, France, Austria, and finally the United States, in an effort to build an overarching narrative on the history of dessert. It covers aspects including material histories, social histories and economic histories. Each chapter ends in the present, and includes a recipe.

Trends observed include shifts from desserts being prepared in patisseries to restaurants, and eaten as part of broader meals rather than sought out alone; desserts are also analyzed as expressing broader cultural attitudes. One instance of this is seen in a contrast between how the rustic apple pie could be seen to reflect America's national character and interest in home cooking, and the Sachertorte as an "edible manifestation" of an "urban, cosmopolitan Vienna".

A broader philosophy expressed in the book says that dessert should be worthy of serious consideration. This idea is based on notions that the pleasure associated with desserts should be valued rather than met with shame, and that dessert permits more fruitful analyses of culture than staples like bread or rice. Krondl writes:

"From a biological standpoint, dessert is frivolous, unnecessary, and even harmful in excess, yet that's precisely why it's interesting... When you talk about dessert you step away from analyzing basic human needs to a conversation about culture."

== Reception ==
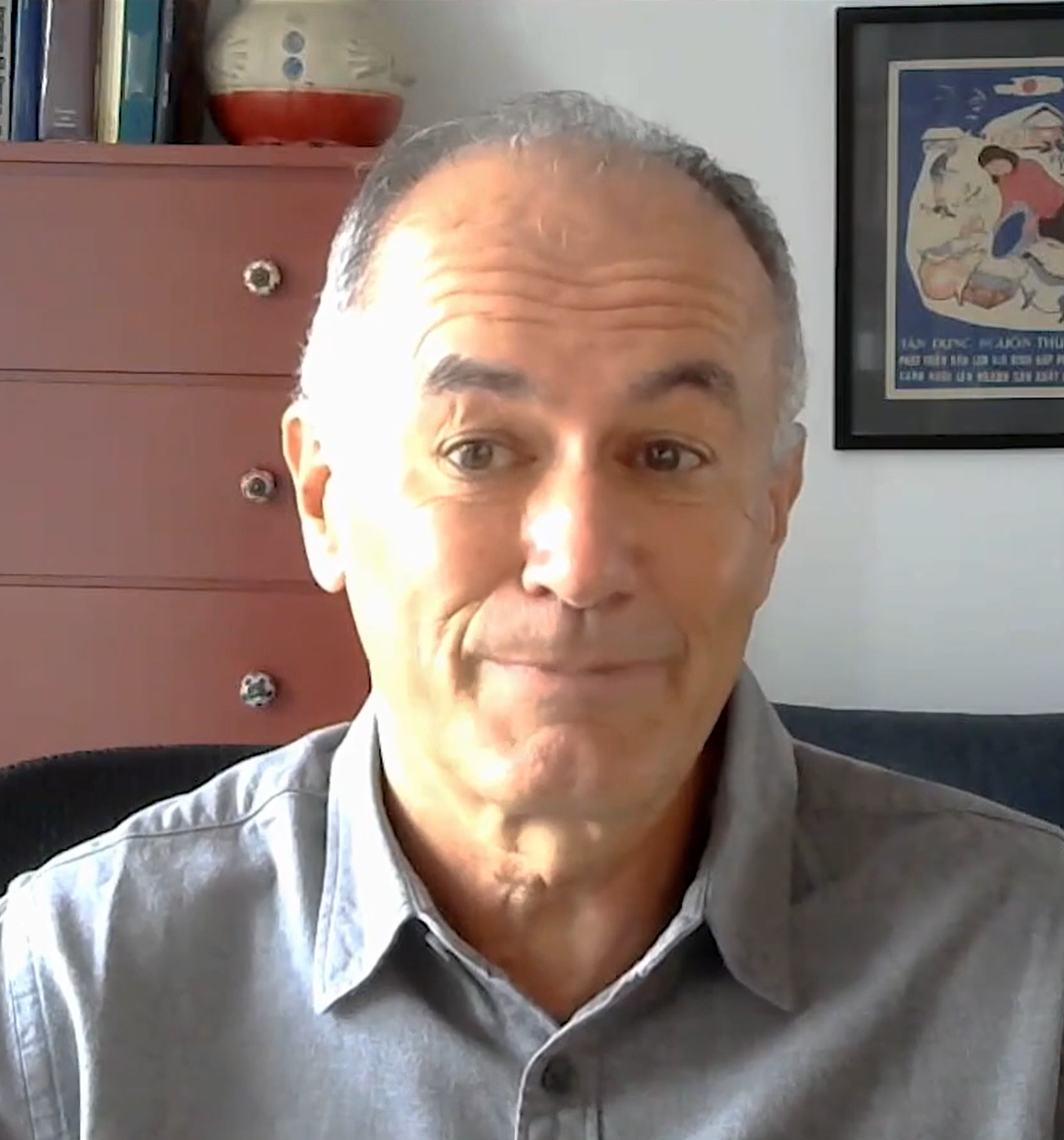
Krondl in 2023

Food historian Ken Albala praised the book for its writing and research, describing Krondl as "a most congenial writer" with Sweet Invention "delightfully written". Albala reserved the most praise for Krondl's treatment of political and economic aspects of the history of desserts. In PopMatters, Sweet Invention was given a score of eight out of ten, receiving praise as informative and interesting. Like Albala, the reviewer found the book information-dense. These sentiments were echoed in a review in Publishers Weekly, with particular attention given to the presence of footnotes and large bibliography.

A more mixed review was given in the New York Times by Dawn Drzal. Drzal found Krondl thoughtful and qualified in his writing on the colonial history of sugar and "fascinating" in the analysis of how desserts could express broader cultural attitudes, but unconvincing in establishing a broad history of dessert from the histories of individual desserts. Some criticism also came from a review in the Minnesota Star Tribune, which found the emphasis on mass-dessert production in the US at the expense of artisans to be unsatisfying, and in the webzine Spectrum Culture, which described the book as dense in parts and lacking for the little detail given to East Asian sweets. Overall, both outlets gave positive reviews, with the Minnesota Star Tribune reviewer finding the book a "wholly satisfying and erudite", and the Spectrum Culture reviewer giving 3 out of 5 stars, saying "It’s a tribute to Krondl’s meticulous style that the subject matter... rarely morphs into the full-on torturous tone of a history textbook."

== See also ==
- The Taste of Conquest
