= Pavochón =

Puerto Rican food

Pavochon is a Puerto Rican food, often served during the Thanksgiving season. Pavochon is turkey seasoned like a roasted pig and stuffed with mofongo. The dish is sometimes served at Christmas, taking the place of the more typical roast pig. The word is a portmanteau of pavo, meaning turkey, and lechón, meaning pig.

== See also ==
- Roast turkey
- Turkey as food
