= Chicken and mushroom pie =

British pie dish

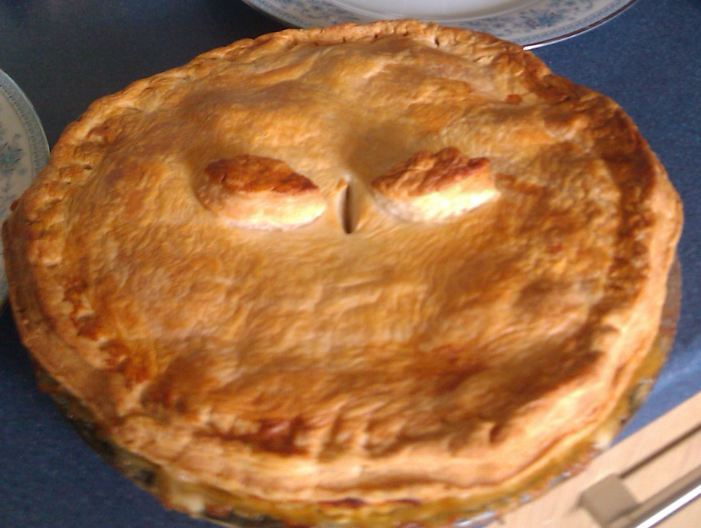
- Type: Savoury pie
- Place of origin: Great Britain
- Main ingredients: Shortcrust pastry, chicken, mushrooms, Velouté sauce
- Variations: Puff pastry

Chicken and mushroom pie is a common British pie, ranked as one of the most popular types of savoury pie along with chicken and Leek in Great Britain and often served in fish-and-chip restaurants. The pie is also considered a favourite in Australia, New Zealand and South Africa. An early reference to the recipe can be found in the 18th-century English cookbook by Hannah Glasse, The Art of Cookery Made Plain and Easy from 1747.

== Ingredients ==
Traditionally, the pie casing usually has a shortcrust pastry top and base (known as a double-crust), with the filling made up of small pieces of chicken and sliced mushrooms in a creamy velouté sauce. Differing ingredients may be used, including mustard, herbs,nutmeg or spring onion as part of the creamy filling, while the top pastry crust is sometimes made with Puff pastry. Chip shops across the country stock these pies and they also are available to buy in supermarkets. Some modern recipes may not include a bottom crust.

== See also ==
- Chicken pastel
- Pot pie
- List of pies, tarts and flans
