= Cavallucci =

Italian Christmas pastry

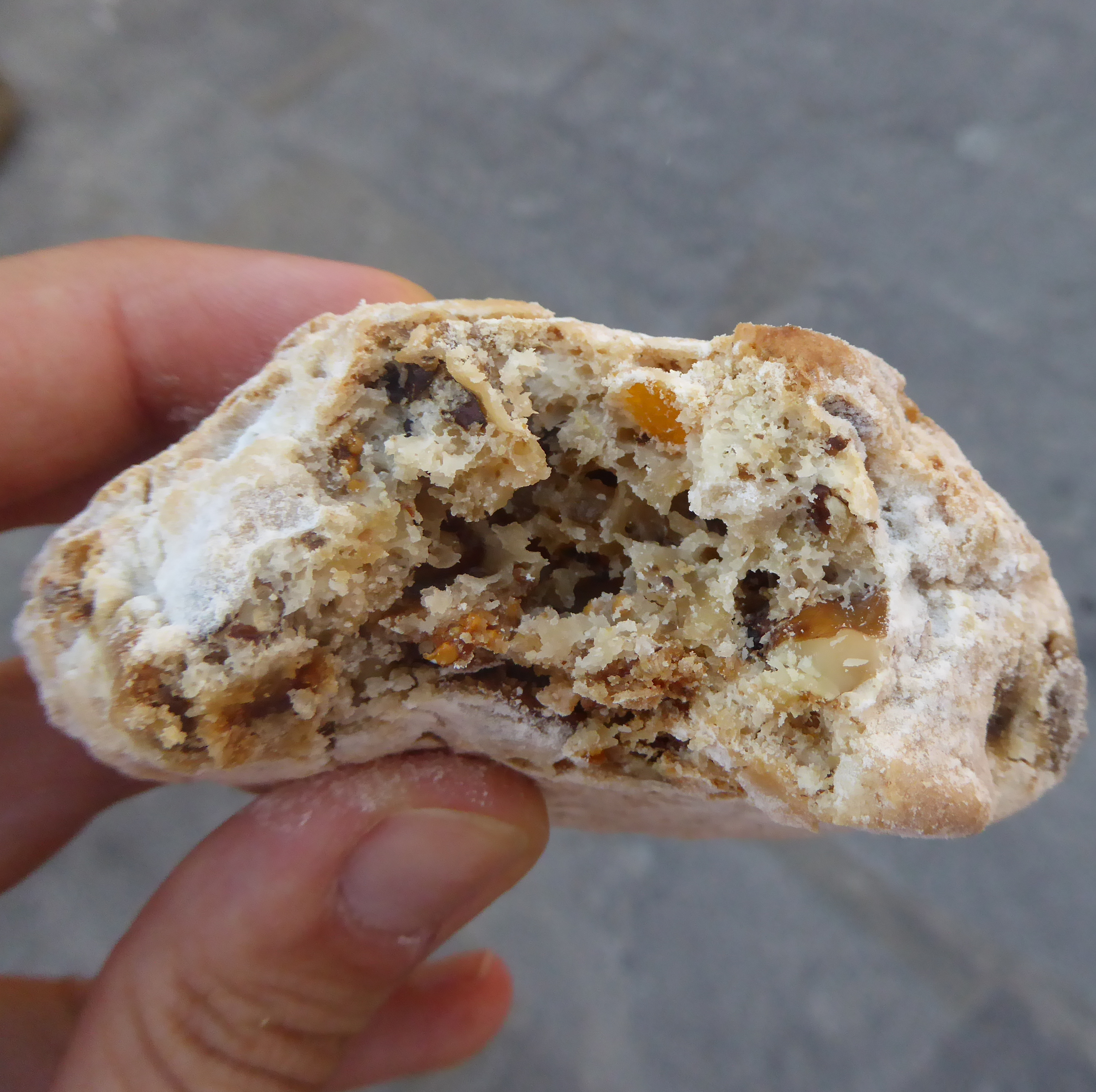
- Type: Pastry
- Place of origin: Italy
- Region or state: Siena, Tuscany
- Main ingredients: Anise seeds, almonds, candied fruits, coriander, flour, Tuscan millefiori honey

Cavallucci are an Italian Christmas pastry made with anise, walnuts, candied fruits, coriander, and flour. They are Sienese in origin, and the name translates approximately to 'little horses'. The chewy pastries are similar to a cookie or biscuit and traditionally use Tuscan millefiori honey as an essential ingredient in the dough.

== History ==
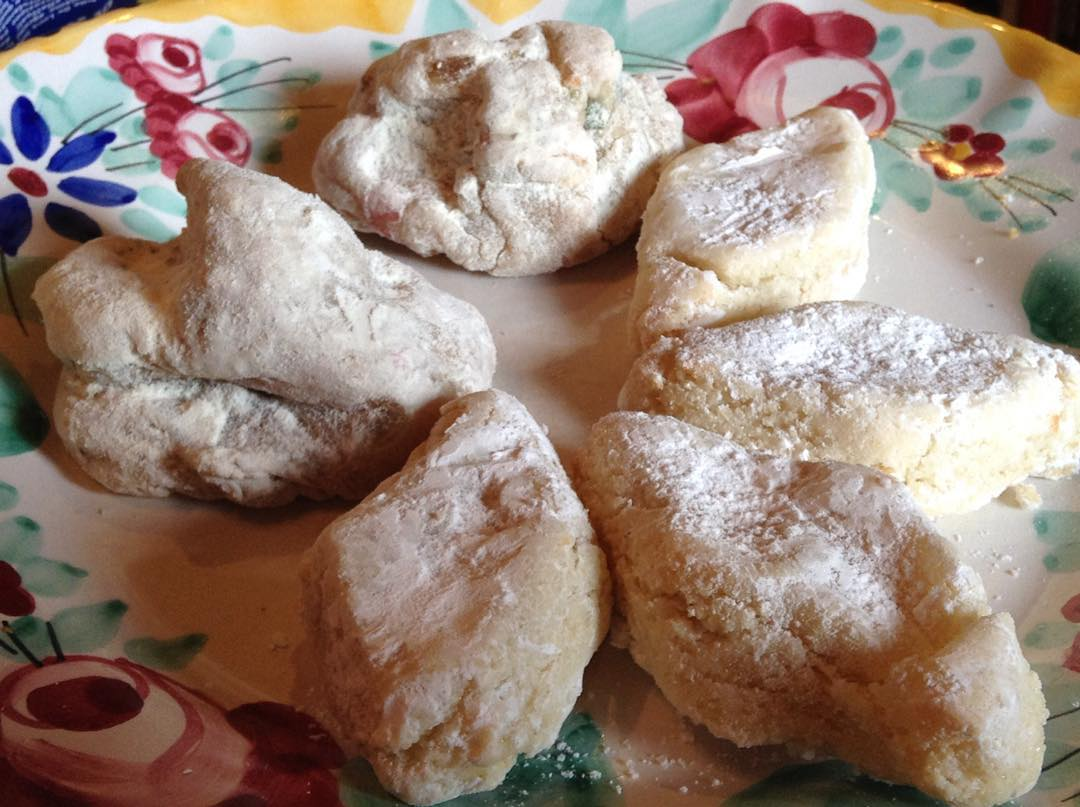
Cavallucci

The pastries were originally imprinted with the image of a horse (cavalli is the Italian term for 'horses'). They are a version of a pastry which is traceable to the reign of Lorenzo the Magnificent (1449–1492), when they were called "biriquocoli".

Many hypotheses are associated with the origin of its name. According to the most popular version of the story, cavallucci were served to travelers on horseback as a source of nourishment for long trips. Another speculation is that postal workers who delivered mail over long distances ate the pastries on a regular basis. Additionally surmised is that these sweets were the usual snack of servants who worked in horse stables of rich Italian aristocrats in Siena, a city which gained its fame for horse racing.

== Serving ==
The pastry is often paired with sweet dessert wines, such as Vin Santo, and dipped into the wine before being eaten.

== See also ==
- List of Italian desserts and pastries
