= The Turkey: An American Story =

2006 book by Andrew F. Smith

- Author: Andrew F. Smith
- Language: English
- Publisher: University of Illinois Press
- Publication date: November 2006
- ISBN: 9780252031632

The Turkey: An American Story is a non-fiction book by Andrew F. Smith.

The book argues that turkeys can give insight into cultural issues and the nature of being American. The book contains the history of turkeys, including information on the existence of turkey bones from 3700 BC, and the domestication of turkeys in Europe after being introduced by explorers of the New World. The book also talks about the efforts to stop the wild turkey from becoming extinct.

A Publishers Weekly review says, "Short chapter sections keep the reading flowing, but the eye-glazing number of facts and dry prose can be overwhelming. Still, Smith has produced a well-researched, comprehensive, though somewhat scattered account of the bird most people take for granted". It was also reviewed in Reference & Research Book News, and The New England Quarterly.
