= Chicken pastel =

Philippine creamy stew or pie

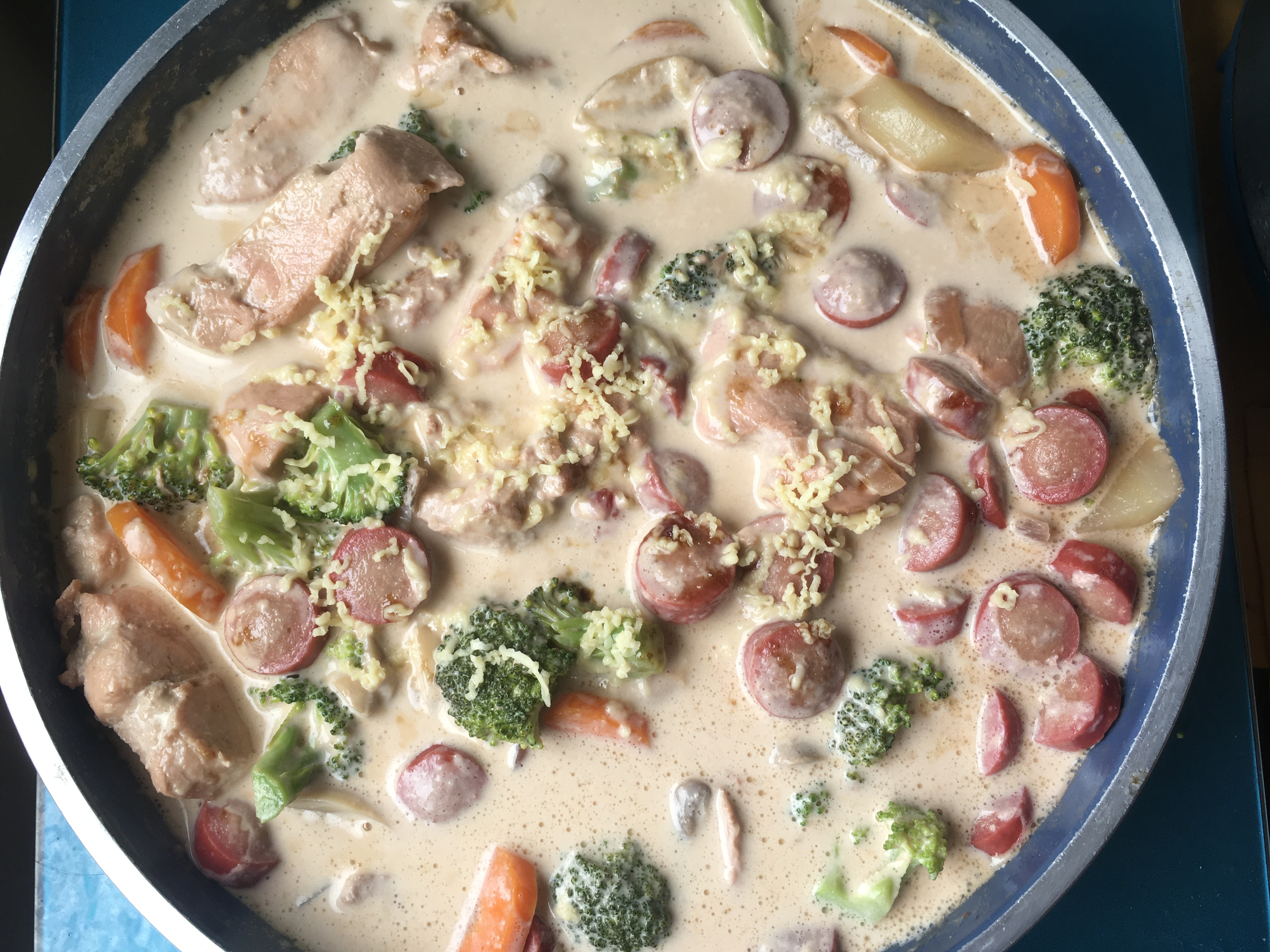
- Chicken pastel with hotdog, chorizo, potatoes, and carrots served as a stew
- Alternative names: Pastel de pollo
- Place of origin: Philippines
- Serving temperature: Hot
- Variations: Pork pastel
- Similar dishes: Chicken and mushroom pie, Chicken à la King

Chicken pastel, also known as pastel de pollo, is a traditional stew or pie from the Philippines made with chicken, sausages, mushrooms, peas, carrots, potatoes, soy sauce, and various spices in a creamy sauce. The sausages used are usually dry chorizos like chorizo de Bilbao or chorizo de Macao, Vienna sausages, and/or hotdogs. It originates from the Spanish dish pastel de pollo, but differs in that Filipino chicken pastel is usually not baked into a pie, uses local Philippine ingredients, and is usually eaten with white rice. It can also be made with pork, in which case it is known as pork pastel. It is commonly served during the Christmas season.

== See also ==
- Chicken and mushroom pie
- Lengua estofado
- Afritada
- Mechado
- List of stews
- List of pies, tarts and flans
