= Doreen Fernandez =

Filipino writer (1934–2002)

Alicia Dorotea Gamboa Fernández
- Born: October 28, 1934; Manila, Philippine Islands
- Died: June 24, 2002 (aged 67); New York City, U.S
- Resting place: Santuario de San Antonio Parish Columbarium
- Education: St. Scholastica's College Manila; Ateneo de Manila University
- Occupations: Cultural historian Food columnist Theater actress Writer

Alicia Dorotea Gamboa Fernández (October 28, 1934 – June 24, 2002), better known as Doreen Fernandez, was a noted Filipino writer, teacher, cultural historian, food critic and scholar who wrote extensively about Philippine theatre and Filipino cuisine.

== Personal life ==
Fernandez was born on 28 October 1934 to Aguinaldo Severino Gamboa of Silay, Negros Occidental and Alicia Lucero of Cabanatuan, Nueva Ecija.

She obtained her Bachelor of Arts degree major in English and History in 1954 from St. Scholastica's College, Manila. She completed her Master of Arts degree major in English Literature (1965) and Ph.D. in Literature (1976) from the Ateneo de Manila University.

She died on June 24, 2002, in New York City due to complications of diabetes.

== Bibliography ==
=== Newspaper columns ===
- "Pot-au-feu" for the Manila Chronicle
- "In Good Taste" for the Philippine Daily Inquirer
- "Foodscape" for Food Magazine
- "Pot Luck" for Mr. and Ms.

=== Articles ===
"What is Filipino Food?" introductory article for The Food of the Philippines book (1999)

"The Filipino Fiesta" introductory article for The Food of the Philippines book (1999)

=== Books ===
- The Iloilo Zarzuela, 1903-1930 (1978)
- Contemporary Theater Arts: Asia and the United States (1984)
- Sarap: Essays on Philippine Food (1988)
- Lasa: A Guide to 100 Restaurants (1989)
- Kinilaw: A Philippine Cuisine of Freshness (1991)
- Tikim: Essays on Philippine Food and Culture (1994)
- Palabas (1997)
- Fruits of the Philippines (1997)
- Palayok: Philippine Food Through Time, on Site, in the Pot (2000)
