= Bread sauce =

Sauce made with milk and bread crumbs

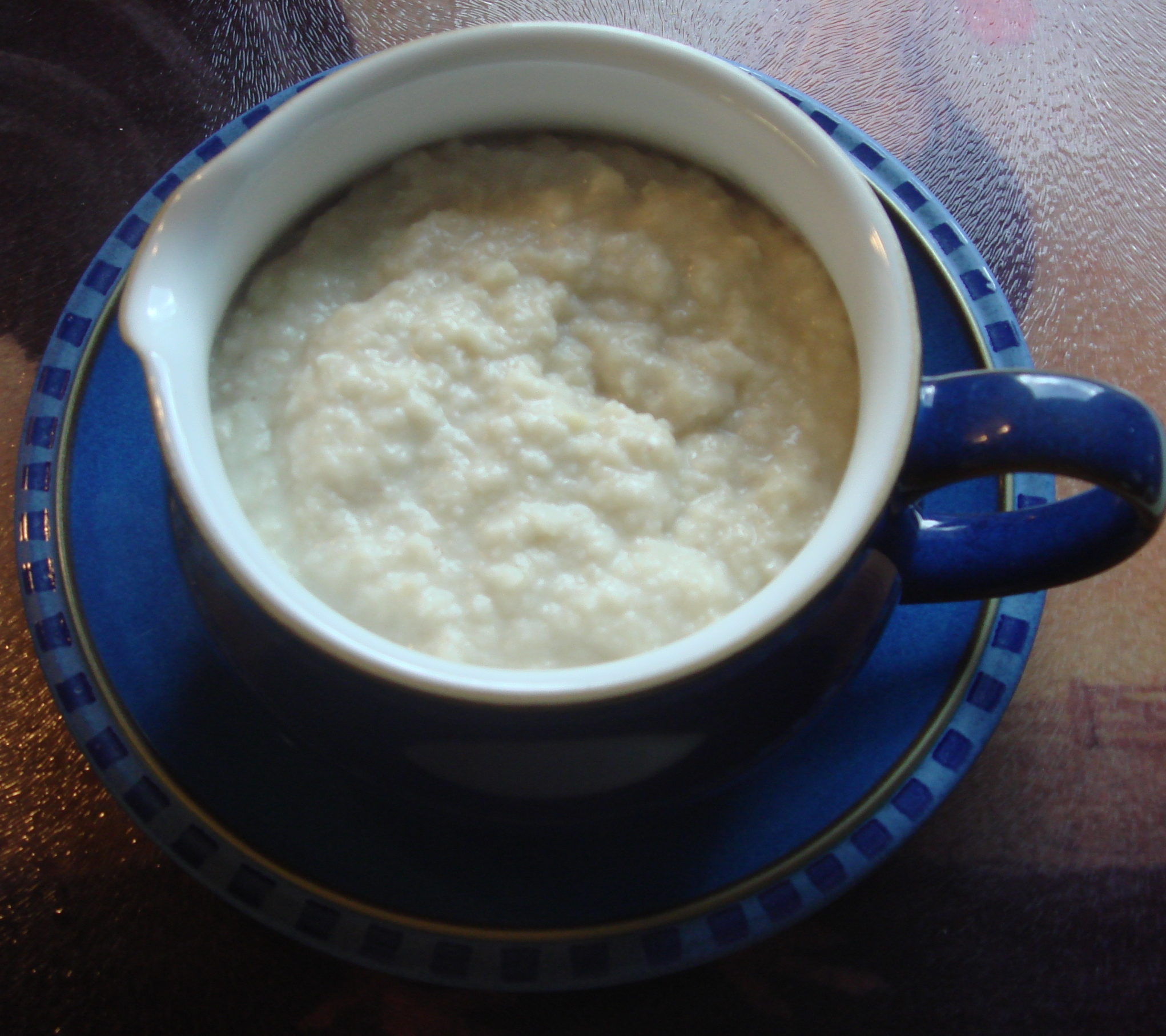
Bread sauce

A bread sauce is a British warm or cold sauce made with milk, which is thickened with bread crumbs, typically eaten with roast chicken or turkey.

The basic recipe calls for milk and onion with breadcrumbs and butter added as thickeners, seasoned with nutmeg, clove, bay leaf, black pepper and salt, with the meat fat from roasting often added too. The use of slightly stale bread is also common.

A survivor of the medieval bread-thickened sauces, it typically accompanies domestic fowl such as turkey or chicken. Bread sauce can be traced back to at least as early as the medieval period, when cooks used bread as a thickening agent for sauces. The utilisation of bread in this way probably comes from cooks wanting to use up their stale bread who discovered that it could be incorporated into sauces to make them thicker.

== See also ==
- List of bread dishes
- List of sauces
