= Andrew F. Smith =

American food historian, born 1946

Andrew F. Smith (born 1946), sometimes called Andy Smith or Andy F. Smith, is an American food historian. He has been a professor of food studies at the New School since 1996.

He is the author or editor of thirty-two books. He was editor-in-chief of and main contributor to both editions of the The Oxford Encyclopedia on Food and Drink in America and is editor of the Reaktion Books series "Edible" and "Food Controversies".

He received the Amelia Award of the Culinary Historians of New York in 2012.

== Career ==
Smith received an M.A. from University of California, Riverside in 1972 and taught social studies for several years.

Smith started writing about food history in 1982, when he became intrigued by the story of Robert Gibbon Johnson and his supposed brave demonstration of eating a tomato to demonstrate that it was not poisonous in Salem, New Jersey. After researching the story, he wrote an article debunking it in 1990 which became the kernel of his book The Tomato in America.

He has taught at the New School's food studies program since 1996.

He has been a consultant to several PBS series, including Eat: The Story of Food.

He is a member of the Culinary Historians of New York, the Association for the Study of Food and Society (ASFS), and the International Association of Culinary Professionals (IACP). He has been on the editorial board of the ASFS journal, Food, Culture & Society.

He donated the Andrew F. Smith Collection of Cookery Ephemera to New York University in 2010 and 2017. It comprises over 1000 items dated 1798 to 2009 that Smith used for researching and teaching.

== Select Publications ==
- editor in chief, The Oxford Encyclopedia on Food and Drink in America, 2004 ISBN 978-0-19-515437-5, 2013 ISBN 978-0-19-973496-2
- The Tomato in America: Early History, Culture, and Cookery (University of South Carolina Press, 1994), ISBN 978-1-57003-000-0
- Pure Ketchup: A History of America's National Condiment (University of South Carolina Press, 1996), ISBN 978-1-57003-139-7
- Popped Culture: A Social History of Popcorn in America (Smithsonian Institution Press, 1999), ISBN 978-1-56098-921-9
- Hamburger: A Global History (Reaktion Books, 2008), ISBN 978-1-86189-390-1
- Eating History: Thirty Turning Points in the Making of American Cuisine (Columbia University Press, 2009), ISBN 978-0-231-14093-5
- Potato: A Global History (Reaktion Books, 2011), ISBN 978-1-86189-799-2
- Savoring Gotham: A Food Lover’s Companion to New York City (Oxford University Press, 2015), ISBN 978-0-19-939702-0 (review)
- Fast Food: The Good, the Bad and the Hungry (Reaktion Books, 2016), ISBN 978-1-78023-574-5
- Food in America: The Past, Present and Future of Food, Farming and the Family Meal (ABC-CLIO, 2017), ISBN 978-1-61069-858-0
- Why Waste Food? (Reaktion Books, 2020), ISBN 978-1-78914-344-7
