= Food, Culture & Society =

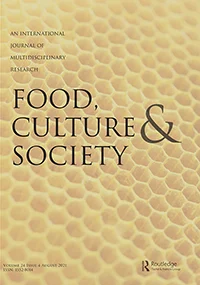
- Discipline: Sociology
- Language: English
- Edited by: Megan J. Elias

Publication details
- Former names: Journal of the Association for the Study of Food and Society; Journal for the Study of Food and Society
- History: 1996-present
- Publisher: Routledge on behalf of the Association for the Study of Food and Society
- Frequency: 5/year
- Impact factor: 1.130 (2020)

Standard abbreviations
- ISO 4: Food Cult. Soc.

Indexing
- ISSN: 1552-8014 (print); 1751-7443 (web)
- OCLC no.: 1264834383

Links
- Journal homepage; Online access; Online archive

Food, Culture & Society is a peer-reviewed academic journal covering all aspects of sociological research on the interrelationships between food and culture. It was established in 1996 as the Journal of the Association for the Study of Food and Society and renamed Journal for the Study of Food and Society in 1998, before obtaining its current name in 2003. It is published by Routledge on behalf of the Association for the Study of Food and Society and the editor-in-chief is Megan J. Elias (Boston University).

== Abstracting and indexing ==
The journal is abstracted and indexed in:

- CAB Abstracts
- Current Contents/Social and Behavioral Sciences
- EBSCO databases
- International Bibliography of the Social Sciences
- Food Science and Technology Abstracts
- Modern Language Association Database
- ProQuest databases
- Scopus
- Social Sciences Citation Index

According to the Journal Citation Reports, the journal has a 2020 impact factor of 1.130.
