= Ken Albala =

American historian

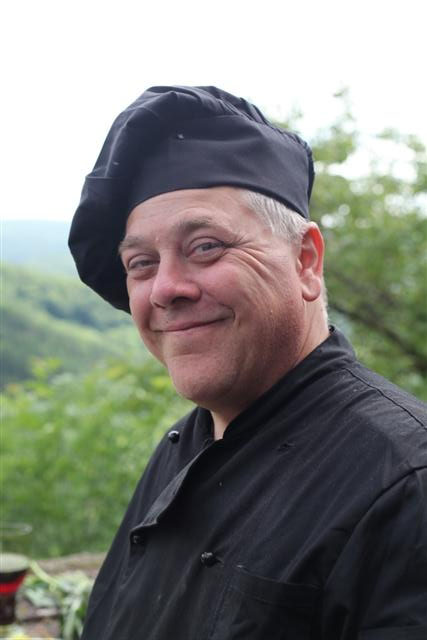
- Ken Albala in 2015
- Born: November 3, 1964 (age 62); Brooklyn, New York, U.S.
- Other name: Kenneth Albala
- Education: PhD, Columbia University, 1993; MA, Yale University, 1987; BA, George Washington University, 1986
- Occupations: Professor; author; blogger
- Years active: 1990–present

Ken Albala is an American food historian, chef, author, and a professor of history at University of the Pacific. He has authored or edited 30 books on food and co-authored "The Lost Art of Real Cooking" and "The Lost Arts of Hearth and Home."

Albala co-edited the journal "Food, Culture and Society" and has made numerous appearances in various forms of media, and at conferences discussing food issues. He is featured on the DVDs: "Food: A Cultural Culinary History" and "Cooking Across the Ages." Albala is also known for his "Food Cultures Around the World" series for Greenwood Press and Rowman and Littlefield Studies in Food and Gastronomy.

== Bibliography ==
Books

- Eating Right in the Renaissance, University of California Press, 2002. ISBN 9780520229471
- Food in Early Modern Europe, Greenwood Press, 2003. ISBN 0313319626
- Opening Up North America, with Caroline Cox, Facts on File, 2005. Revised ed, 2009. ISBN 1604131969
- Cooking in Europe: 1250–1650, Greenwood Press, 2006. ISBN 0313330964
- The Banquet: Dining in the Great Courts of Late Renaissance Europe, U. of Illinois Press, 2007.
- Beans: A History, Berg Publishers, 2007. ISBN 1845204301
- Pancake, Reaktion Press, 2008. Translated into Japanese 2013. ISBN 9781861893925
- The Lost Art of Real Cooking, with Rosanna Nafziger, Perigee/Penguin, 2010. ISBN 0399535888
- Three World Cuisines: Italian, Mexican, Chinese. AltaMira Press, 2012. ISBN 9780759121256
- The Lost Arts of Hearth and Home, with Rosanna Nafziger, Perigee/Penguin, 2012. ISBN 0399537775
- Grow Food, Eat Food, Share Food. Oregon State University Press, 2013. ISBN 978-0-87071-718-5
- Nuts: A Global History. Reaktion Press, 2014. ISBN 9781780232829
- The Most Excellent Book of Cookery: An edition and translation of the 16th century Livre fort excellent de cuysine. With Timothy Tomasik. Prospect Books, 2014. ISBN 978-1-903018-96-5
- Noodle Soup: Recipes, Techniques, Obsession. University of Illinois Press, 2018. ISBN 9780252083181
- The Great Gelatin Revival. University of Illinois Press, 2023. ISBN 9780252086816
- Opulent Nosh. University of Alabama Press, 2024. ISBN 9780817321888
- Century in Stockton. University of the Pacific, 2024. (No ISBN available yet)
- The World Atlas of Fermented Foods and Drinks. University of California Press. ISBN 978-0-520-42287-2

Edited volumes and encyclopedias

- The Business of Food: Encyclopedia of the Food and Drink Industries. With Gary Allen. Greenwood Press, 2007.
- Human Cuisine. With Gary Allen. Thyestian Press/Booksurge, 2008. ISBN 1419693913
- Food Cultures of the World Encyclopedia. Four Volumes. Greenwood Press/ABC-CLIO, 2011. ISBN 978-0-313-37626-9
- Food and Faith in the Christian Tradition. With Trudy Eden. Columbia University Press, 2011. ISBN 9780231149976
- A Cultural History of Food in The Renaissance. Fabio Parasecoli and Peter Scholliers, Series Editors. Ken Albala, vol. 3 editor. Berg Publishers, 2012. ISBN 9780857850256
- Routledge International Handbook of Food Studies. Routledge, 2012. Paperback ed. 2014. ISBN 978-1-13-801949-2
- Food History: A Primary Source Reader. Bloomsbury, 2014. ISBN 9780857854124
- From Famine to Fast Food: Nutrition, Diet and Concepts of Health Around the World. ABC-CLIO, 2014. ISBN 978-1-61069-743-9
- Food in Time and Place: The American Historical Association Companion to Food History. Paul Freedman, Joyce Chaplin and Ken Albala, editors. University of California Press, 2014. ISBN 9780520283589
- Food Issues: An Encyclopedia. Three Volumes. Sage Publications, 2015. ISBN 9781452243016
- At the Table: Food and Family Around the World. Greenwood/ABC-CLIO, 2016. ISBN 9781610697378

== Awards ==
The Distinguished Faculty Award from the University of the Pacific in 2023 and the Tully Knoles Endowed Professorship in 2022.

- "Three World Cuisines: Italian, Mexican, Chinese" was the winner of the Gourmand World Cookbook Award for "Best Foreign Cuisine Book in the World" 2013.
- "Beans" won the 2008 International Association of Culinary Professionals Jane Grigson Award and the Cordon d'Or in Food History/Literature.
