= Medieval cuisine =

Foods, eating habits, and cooking methods of the Middle Ages

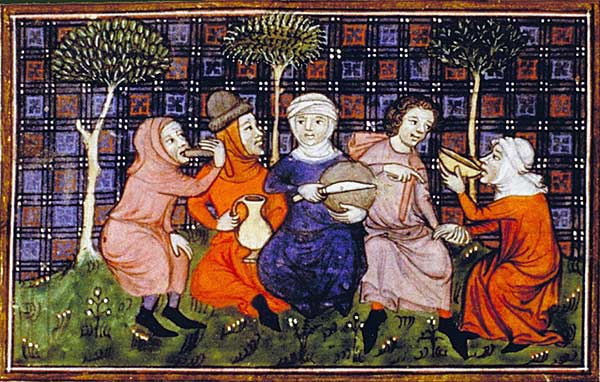
Peasants sharing a simple meal of bread and drink; Livre du roi Modus et de la reine Ratio, 14th century

Medieval cuisine includes foods, eating habits, and cooking methods of various European cultures during the Middle Ages, which lasted from the 5th to the 15th century. During this period, diets and cooking changed less than they did in the early modern period that followed, when those changes helped lay the foundations for modern European cuisines.

Cereals remained the most important staple during the Early Middle Ages as rice was introduced to Europe late, with the potato first used in the 16th century, and much later for the wider population. Barley, oats, and rye were eaten by the poor while wheat was generally more expensive. These were consumed as bread, porridge, gruel, and pasta by people of all classes. Cheese, fruits, and vegetables were important supplements for the lower orders while meat was more expensive and generally more prestigious. Game, a form of meat acquired from hunting, was common only on the nobility's tables. The most prevalent butcher's meats were pork, chicken, and other poultry. Beef, which required greater investment in land, was less common. A wide variety of freshwater and saltwater fish were also eaten, with cod and herring being mainstays among the northern populations.

Slow and inefficient transports made long-distance trade of many foods very expensive (perishability made other foods untransportable). Because of this, the nobility's food was more prone to foreign influence than the cuisine of the poor; it was dependent on exotic spices and expensive imports. As each level of society attempted to imitate the one above it, innovations from international trade and foreign wars from the 12th century onward gradually disseminated through the upper middle class of medieval cities. Aside from economic unavailability of luxuries such as spices, decrees outlawed consumption of certain foods among certain social classes and sumptuary laws limited conspicuous consumption among the nouveau riche. Social norms also dictated that the food of the working class be less refined, since it was believed there was a natural resemblance between one's way of life and one's food; hard manual labor required coarser, cheaper food.

A type of refined cooking that developed in the Late Middle Ages set the standard among the nobility all over Europe. Common seasonings in the highly spiced sweet-sour repertory typical of upper-class medieval food included verjuice, wine, and vinegar in combination with spices such as black pepper, saffron, and ginger. These, along with the widespread use of honey or sugar, gave many dishes a sweet-sour flavor. Almonds were very popular as a thickener in soups, stews, and sauces, particularly as almond milk.

== Dietary norms ==
The cuisines of the cultures of the Mediterranean Basin since antiquity had been based on cereals, particularly various types of wheat. Porridge, gruel, and later bread became the basic staple foods that made up the majority of calorie intake for most of the population. From the 8th to the 11th centuries, the proportion of various cereals in the diet rose from about a third to three-quarters. Dependence on wheat remained significant throughout the medieval era, and spread northward with the rise of Christianity. In colder climates, however, it was usually unaffordable for the majority population, and was associated with the higher classes. The centrality of bread in religious rituals such as the Eucharist meant that it enjoyed an especially high prestige among foodstuffs. Only olive oil and wine had a comparable value, but both remained quite exclusive outside the warmer grape- and olive-growing regions. The symbolic role of bread as both sustenance and substance is illustrated in a sermon given by Saint Augustine:

This bread retells your history [...] You were brought to the threshing floor of the Lord and were threshed [...] While awaiting catechism, you were like grain kept in the granary [...] At the baptismal font you were kneaded into a single dough. In the oven of the Holy Ghost you were baked into God's true bread.

The growing presence of Islam in the medieval period defined a shift in both the religious attitudes of Europeans and their perspectives on cuisine. As the Mediterranean became increasingly symbolic of a religious divide between European Christianity and Islam, tensions placed significance on symbolic dietary practices. The religious connotations of bread and wine in Christianity opposed the dietary restrictions on alcohol and the differences in the bread-making practices pertinent to Islamic cuisine. Thus, the consumption of bread and wine spread northward from the Mediterranean region in part as a means of Christian opposition. Additionally, pork was reinforced in European cuisine as a product of importance and value, differing from the Islamic dietary restrictions on pork consumption. However, these divergences did not prohibit the exchange of flavors and goods from occurring between Islamic regions and Europe.

After the bubonic plague pandemic in 1347–1352 (colloquially known as the "Black Death"), dietary norms changed drastically due to different food resources available in Europe. Since the population in Europe significantly dipped, farm land and livestock was left mostly unattended and uncared for. Availability of wheat and oats, popular foods before the Black Death, started declining. Evidence from bone collagen samples suggest that after the Black Death, Europeans consumed more animal protein such as beef, goats, chicken, sheep and pork rather than cereal and grains.

=== Class constraints ===
Medieval society was highly stratified. In a time when famine was commonplace and social hierarchies were often brutally enforced, food was an important marker of social status in a way that has no equivalent today in most developed countries. According to the ideological norm, society consisted of the three estates of the realm: commoners, that is, the working classes—by far the largest group; the clergy, and the nobility. The relationship between the classes was strictly hierarchical, with the nobility and clergy claiming worldly and spiritual overlordship over commoners. Within the nobility and clergy there were also a number of ranks ranging from kings and popes to dukes, bishops and their subordinates, such as squires and priests. One was expected to remain in one's social class and to respect the authority of the ruling classes. Political power was displayed not just by rule, but also by displaying wealth. Refined nobles dined on fresh game seasoned with exotic spices, and displayed refined table manners. Rough laborers could make do with coarse barley bread, salt pork and beans and were not expected to display etiquette. Even dietary recommendations were different: the diet of the upper classes was considered to be as much a requirement of their refined physical constitution as a sign of economic reality. The digestive system of a lord was considered to be more refined than that of lower-class subordinates and therefore required finer foods.

In the late Middle Ages, the increasing wealth of middle class merchants and traders meant that commoners began emulating the aristocracy. This threatened to break down some of the symbolic barriers between the nobility and the lower classes. The response came in two forms: literature warning of the dangers of adapting a diet inappropriate for one's class, and sumptuary laws that put a cap on the lavishness of commoners' banquets. Animal parts were even assigned to different social classes.

=== The Church ===
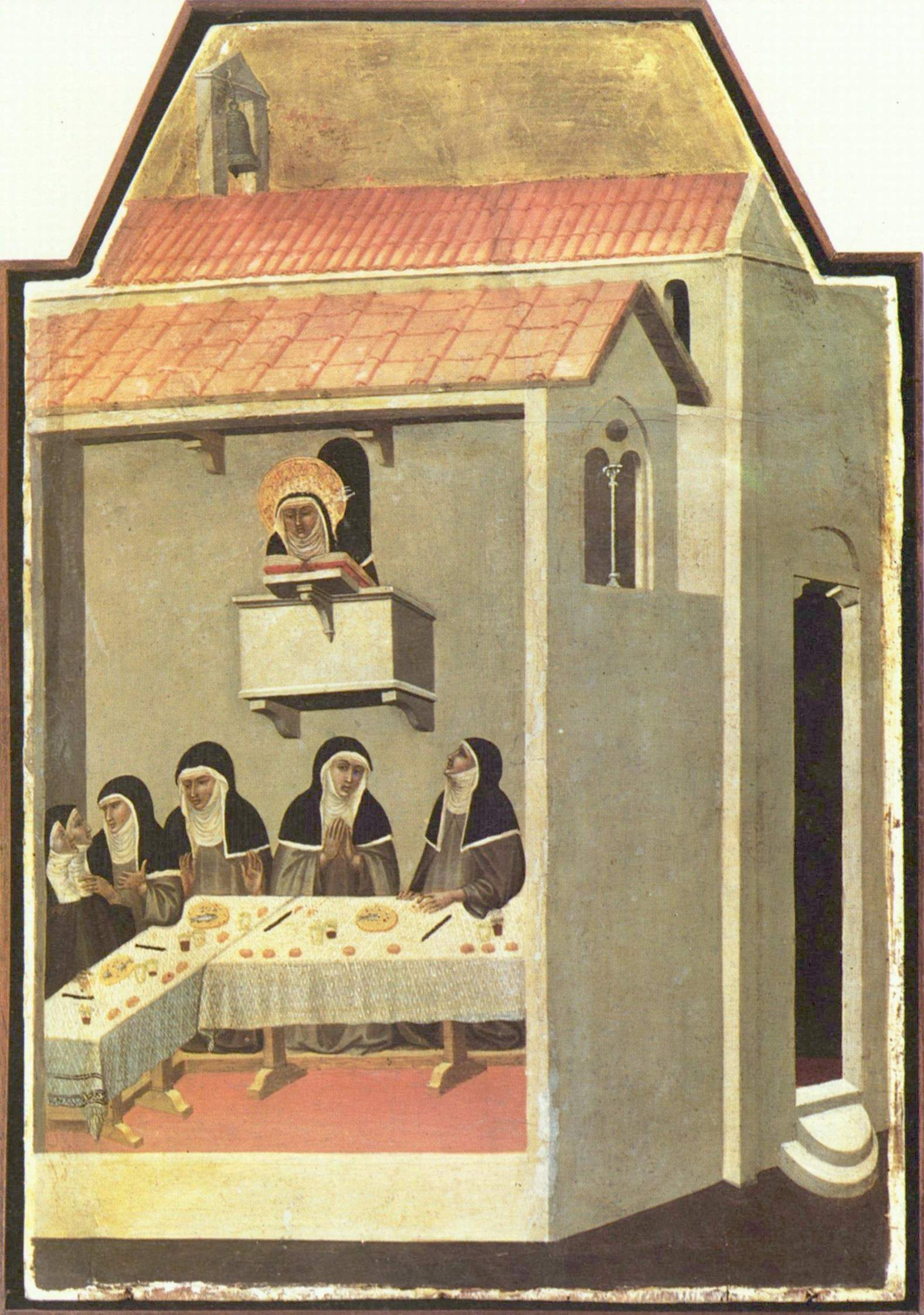
Nuns dining in silence while listening to a Bible reading. The nuns use hand gestures to communicate. The Life of Blessed Saint Humility by Pietro Lorenzetti, 1341.

The Catholic and Orthodox Churches, and their calendars, had great influence on eating habits; consumption of meat was forbidden for a full third of the year for most Christians. All animal products, including eggs and dairy products (during the strictest fasting periods also fish), were generally prohibited during Lent and fast. Additionally, it was customary for all citizens to fast before taking the Eucharist. These fasts were occasionally for a full day and required total abstinence.

Both the Eastern and the Western churches ordained that feast should alternate with fast. In most of Europe, Fridays were fast days, and fasting was observed on various other days and periods, including Lent and Advent. Meat, and animal products such as milk, cheese, butter, and eggs, were not allowed, and at times also fish. The fast was intended to mortify the body and invigorate the soul, and also to remind the faster of Christ's sacrifice for humanity. The intention was not to portray certain foods as unclean, but rather to teach a spiritual lesson in self-restraint through abstention. During particularly severe fast days, the number of daily meals was also reduced to one. Even if most people respected these restrictions and usually made penance when they violated them, there were also numerous ways of circumventing them, a conflict of ideals and practice summarized by writer Bridget Ann Henisch:

It is the nature of man to build the most complicated cage of rules and regulations in which to trap himself, and then, with equal ingenuity and zest, to bend his brain to the problem of wriggling triumphantly out again. Lent was a challenge; the game was to ferret out the loopholes.

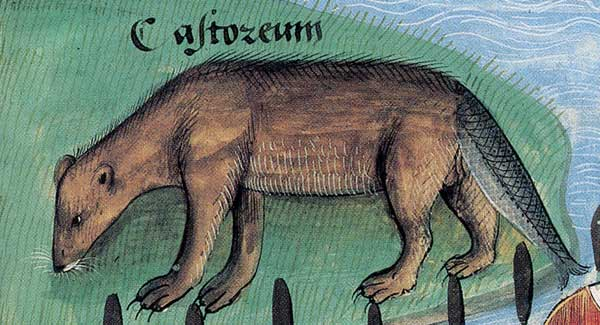
During the Middle Ages it was believed that beaver tails were of such a fish-like nature that they could be eaten on fast days; Livre des simples médecines, about 1480.

While animal products were to be avoided during times of penance, pragmatic compromises often prevailed. The definition of "fish" was often extended to marine and semi-aquatic animals such as whales, barnacle geese, puffins, and even beavers. The choice of ingredients may have been limited, but that did not mean that meals were smaller. Neither were there any restrictions against (moderate) drinking or eating sweets. Banquets held on fish days could be splendid, and were popular occasions for serving illusion food that imitated meat, cheese, and eggs in various ingenious ways; fish could be moulded to look like venison and fake eggs could be made by stuffing empty egg shells with fish roe and almond milk and cooking them in coals. While Byzantine church officials took a hard-line approach, and discouraged any culinary refinement for the clergy, their Western counterparts were far more lenient. There was also no lack of grumbling about the rigours of fasting among the laity. During Lent, kings and schoolboys, commoners and nobility, all complained about being deprived of meat for the long, hard weeks of solemn contemplation of their sins. At Lent, owners of livestock were even warned to keep an eye out for hungry dogs frustrated by a "hard siege by Lent and fish bones".

The trend from the 13th century onward was toward a more legalistic interpretation of fasting. Nobles were careful not to eat meat on fast days, but still dined in style; fish replaced meat, often as imitation hams and bacon; almond milk replaced animal milk as an expensive non-dairy alternative; faux eggs made from almond milk were cooked in blown-out eggshells, flavoured and coloured with exclusive spices. In some cases, the lavishness of noble tables was outdone by Benedictine monasteries, which served as many as sixteen courses during certain feast days. Exceptions from fasting were frequently made for very broadly defined groups. Thomas Aquinas (about 1225–1274) believed dispensation should be provided for children, the old, pilgrims, workers and beggars, but not the poor as long as they had some sort of shelter. There are many accounts of members of monastic orders who flouted fasting restrictions through clever interpretations of the Bible. Since the sick were exempt from fasting, there often evolved the notion that fasting restrictions only applied to the main dining area, and many Benedictine friars would simply eat their fast day meals in what was called the misericord (at those times) rather than the refectory. Newly-assigned Catholic monastery officials sought to amend the problem of fast evasion not merely with moral condemnations, but by making sure that well-prepared non-meat dishes were available on fast days.

=== Dietetics ===
Medical science of the Middle Ages had a considerable influence on what was considered healthy and nutritious among the upper classes. One's lifestyle—including diet, exercise, appropriate social behavior, and approved medical remedies—was the way to good health, and all types of food were assigned certain properties that affected a person's health. All foodstuffs were also classified on scales ranging from hot to cold and moist to dry, according to the four bodily humours theory proposed by Galen that dominated Western medical science from late Antiquity and throughout the Middle Ages.

Medieval scholars considered human digestion to be a process similar to cooking. The processing of food in the stomach was seen as a continuation of the preparation initiated by the cook. For the food to be properly "cooked" and for the nutrients to be properly absorbed, it was important that the stomach be filled in an appropriate manner. Easily digestible foods would be consumed first, followed by gradually heavier dishes. If this regimen were not respected, it was believed that heavy foods would sink to the bottom of the stomach, thus blocking the digestion duct; as such, food would digest very slowly and cause putrefaction of the body and draw bad humours into the stomach. It was also of vital importance that food of differing properties not be mixed.

Before a meal, the stomach would preferably be "opened" with an apéritif (from Latin aperire, 'to open') that was preferably of a hot and dry nature: confections made from honey- or sugar-coated spices like ginger, caraway, and seeds of anise, fennel, or cumin, wine and sweetened fortified milk drinks. As the stomach had been opened, it should then be "closed" at the end of the meal with the help of a digestive, most commonly a dragée, which during the Middle Ages consisted of lumps of spiced sugar, or hypocras, a wine flavoured with fragrant spices, along with aged cheese. A meal would ideally begin with easily digestible fruit, such as apples. It would then be followed by vegetables such as cabbage, lettuce, purslane, herbs, moist fruits, and light meats, such as chicken or kid, with pottages and broths. After that came the "heavy" meats, such as pork and beef, as well as vegetables and nuts, including pears and chestnuts, both considered difficult to digest. It was popular, and recommended by medical expertise, to finish the meal with aged cheese and various digestives.

The most ideal food was that which most closely matched the humour of human beings, i.e. moderately warm and moist. Food should preferably also be finely chopped, ground, pounded and strained to achieve a true mixture of all the ingredients. White wine was believed to be cooler than red and the same distinction was applied to red and white vinegar. Milk was moderately warm and moist, but the milk of different animals was often believed to differ. Egg yolks were considered to be warm and moist while the whites were cold and moist. Skilled cooks were expected to conform to the regimen of humoral medicine. Even if this limited the combinations of food they could prepare, there was still ample room for artistic variation by the chef.

=== Calorie structure ===
The calorie content and structure of medieval diet varied over time, from region to region, and between classes. However, for most people, the diet tended to be high-carbohydrate, with most of the budget spent on, and the majority of calories provided by, cereals and alcohol (such as beer). Even though meat was highly valued by all, lower classes often could not afford it, nor were they allowed by the church to consume it every day. In England in the 13th century, meat contributed a negligible portion of calories to a typical harvest worker's diet; however, its share increased after the Black Death and, by the 15th century, it provided about 20% of the total. Even among the lay nobility of medieval England, grain provided 65–70% of calories in the early 14th century, though a generous provision of meat and fish was included, and their consumption of meat increased in the aftermath of the Black Death as well. In one early-15th-century English aristocratic household for which detailed records are available (that of the Earl of Warwick), gentle members of the household received a staggering 3.8 pounds (1.7 kg) of assorted meats in a typical meat meal in the autumn and 2.4 pounds (1.1 kg) in the winter, in addition to 0.9 pounds (0.41 kg) of bread and 1/4 imperial gallon (1.1 L; 0.30 US gal) of beer or possibly wine (and there would have been two meat meals per day, five days a week, except during Lent). In the household of Henry Stafford in 1469, gentle members received 2.1 pounds (0.95 kg) of meat per meal, and all others received 1.04 pounds (0.47 kg), and everyone was given 0.4 pounds (0.18 kg) of bread and 1/4 imperial gallon (1.1 L; 0.30 US gal) of alcohol. On top of these quantities, some members of these households (usually, a minority) ate breakfast, which would not include any meat, but would probably include another 1/4 imperial gallon (1.1 L; 0.30 US gal) of beer; and uncertain quantities of bread and ale could have been consumed in between meals. The diet of the lord of the household differed somewhat from this structure, including less red meat, more high-quality wild game, fresh fish, fruit, and wine.

In monasteries, the basic structure of the diet was laid down by the Rule of Saint Benedict in the 7th century and tightened by Pope Benedict XII in 1336, but (as mentioned above) monks were adept at "working around" these rules. Wine was restricted to about 10 imperial fluid ounces (280 mL; 9.6 US fl oz) per day, but there was no corresponding limit on beer, and, at Westminster Abbey, each monk was given an allowance of 1 imperial gallon (4.5 L; 1.2 US gal) of beer per day. Meat of "four-footed animals" was prohibited altogether, year-round, for everyone but the very weak and the sick. This was circumvented in part by declaring that offal, and various processed foods such as bacon, were not meat. Secondly, Benedictine monasteries contained a room called the misericord, where the Rule of Saint Benedict did not apply, and where a large number of monks ate. Each monk would be regularly sent either to the misericord or to the refectory. When Pope Benedict XII ruled that at least half of all monks should be required to eat in the refectory on any given day, monks responded by excluding the sick and those invited to the abbot's table from the reckoning. Overall, a monk at Westminster Abbey in the late 15th century would have been allowed 2.25 pounds (1.02 kg) of bread per day; 5 eggs per day, except on Fridays and in Lent; 2 pounds (0.91 kg) of meat per day, four days per week (excluding Wednesday, Friday, and Saturday), except in Advent and Lent; and 2 pounds (0.91 kg) of fish per day, three days per week and every day during Advent and Lent.

The overall calorie intake is subject to some debate. One typical estimate is that an adult peasant male needed 2,900 calories (12,000 kJ) per day, and an adult female needed 2,150 calories (9,000 kJ). Both lower and higher estimates have been proposed. Those engaged in particularly heavy physical labor, as well as sailors and soldiers, may have consumed 3,500 calories (15,000 kJ) or more per day. Intakes of aristocrats may have reached 4,000 to 5,000 calories (17,000 to 21,000 kJ) per day. It has been estimated that monks in Westminster Abbey in the early sixteenth century had a food allowance of around 6,200 calories (26,000 kJ) per day on average days, and around 4,900 calories (21,000 kJ) per day during Lent. While it is difficult to know how much of this allowance was actually consumed, rather than being left as a form of poor relief, Harvey (1993) suggests that around 60 percent of the allowance may have been consumed on an average day. Skeletal evidence suggests that monks suffered more frequently from conditions common among the obese, such as arthritis, with one estimate suggesting an incidence of at least one obesity-related osteoarthritis of nearly six times the average for the time.

=== Regional variation ===
The regional specialties that are a feature of early modern and contemporary cuisine were not in evidence in the sparser documentation that survives. Instead, medieval cuisine can be differentiated by the cereals and the oils that shaped dietary norms and crossed ethnic and, later, national boundaries. Geographical variation in eating was primarily the result of differences in climate, political administration, and local customs that varied across the continent. Though sweeping generalizations should be avoided, more or less distinct areas where certain foodstuffs dominated can be discerned. In the British Isles, northern France, the Low Countries, the northern German-speaking areas, Scandinavia and the Baltic, the climate was generally too harsh for the cultivation of grapes and olives. In the south, wine was the common drink for both rich and poor alike (though the commoner usually had to settle for cheap second-pressing wine) while beer was the commoner's drink in the north and wine an expensive import. Citrus fruits (though not the kinds most common today) and pomegranates were common around the Mediterranean. Dried figs and dates were available in the north, but were used rather sparingly in cooking.

Olive oil was a ubiquitous ingredient in Mediterranean cultures, but remained an expensive import in the north where oils of poppy, walnut, hazel, and filbert were the most affordable alternatives. Butter and lard, especially after the terrible mortality during the Black Death made them less scarce, were used in considerable quantities in the northern and northwestern regions, especially in the Low Countries. Almost universal in middle and upper class cooking all over Europe was the almond, which was in the ubiquitous and highly versatile almond milk, which was used as a substitute in dishes that otherwise required eggs or milk, though the bitter variety of almonds came along much later.

== Meals ==
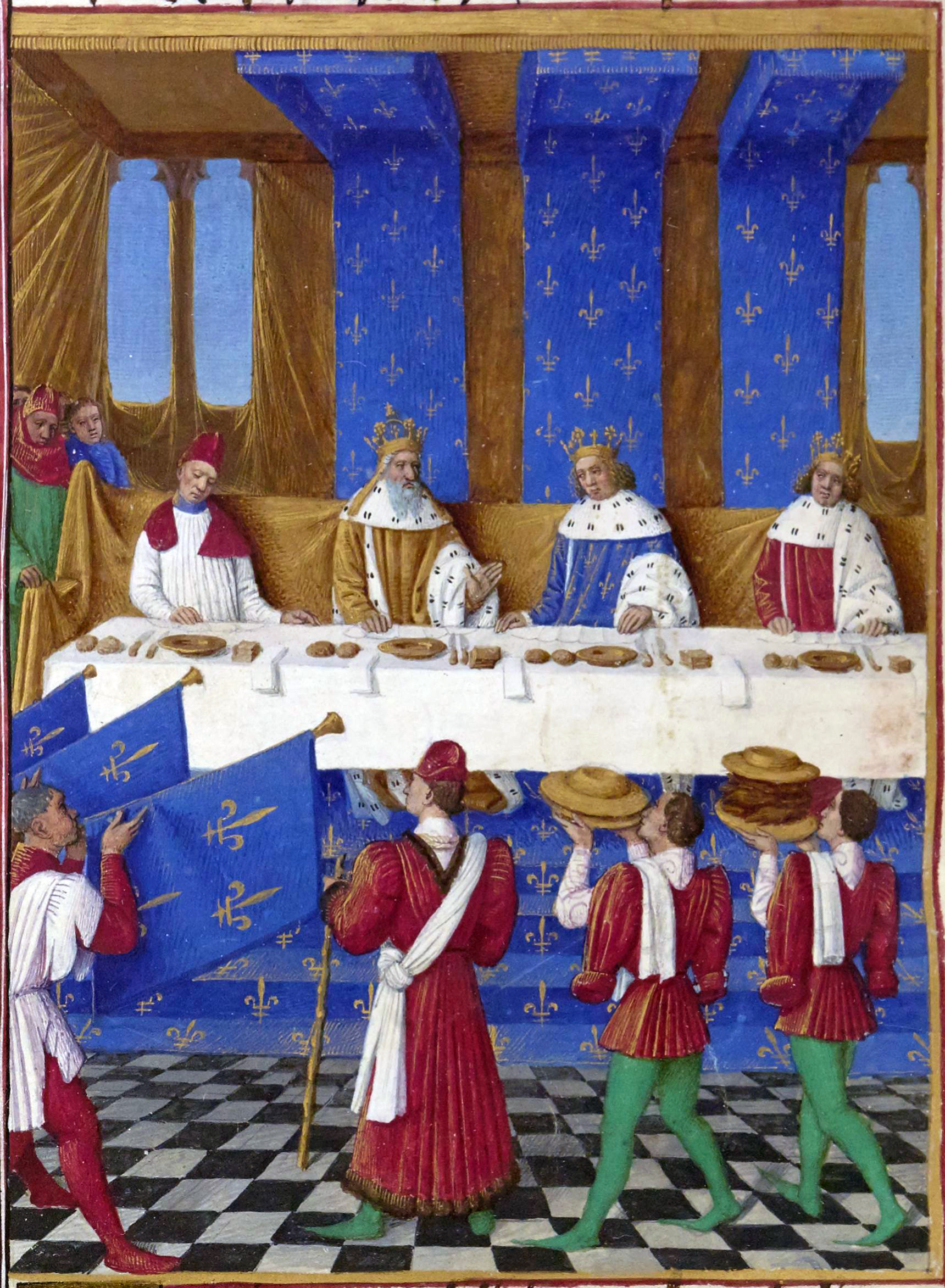
Banquet given in Paris in 1378 by Charles V of France (second from right) for Charles IV, Holy Roman Emperor (left), and his son Wenceslaus, King of the Romans. Each diner has two knives, a salt cellar, a napkin, bread and a plate (Banquet de Charles V le Sage, by Jean Fouquet, around 1455–60).

In Europe, there were typically two meals a day: dinner at mid-day and a lighter supper in the evening. The two-meal system remained consistent throughout the late Middle Ages. Smaller intermediate meals were common, but became a matter of social status, as those who did not have to perform manual labor could go without them. Moralists frowned on breaking the overnight fast too early, and members of the church and cultivated gentry avoided it. For practical reasons, breakfast was still eaten by working men, and was tolerated for young children, women, the elderly and the sick. Because the church preached against gluttony and other weaknesses of the flesh, men tended to be ashamed of the weak practicality of breakfast. Lavish dinner banquets and late-night reresopers (from Occitan rèire-sopar, "late supper") with considerable alcoholic beverage consumption were considered immoral. The latter were especially associated with gambling, crude language, drunkenness, and lewd behavior. Minor meals and snacks were common (although also disliked by the church), and working men commonly received an allowance from their employers to buy nuncheons, small morsels to be eaten during breaks.

=== Etiquette ===
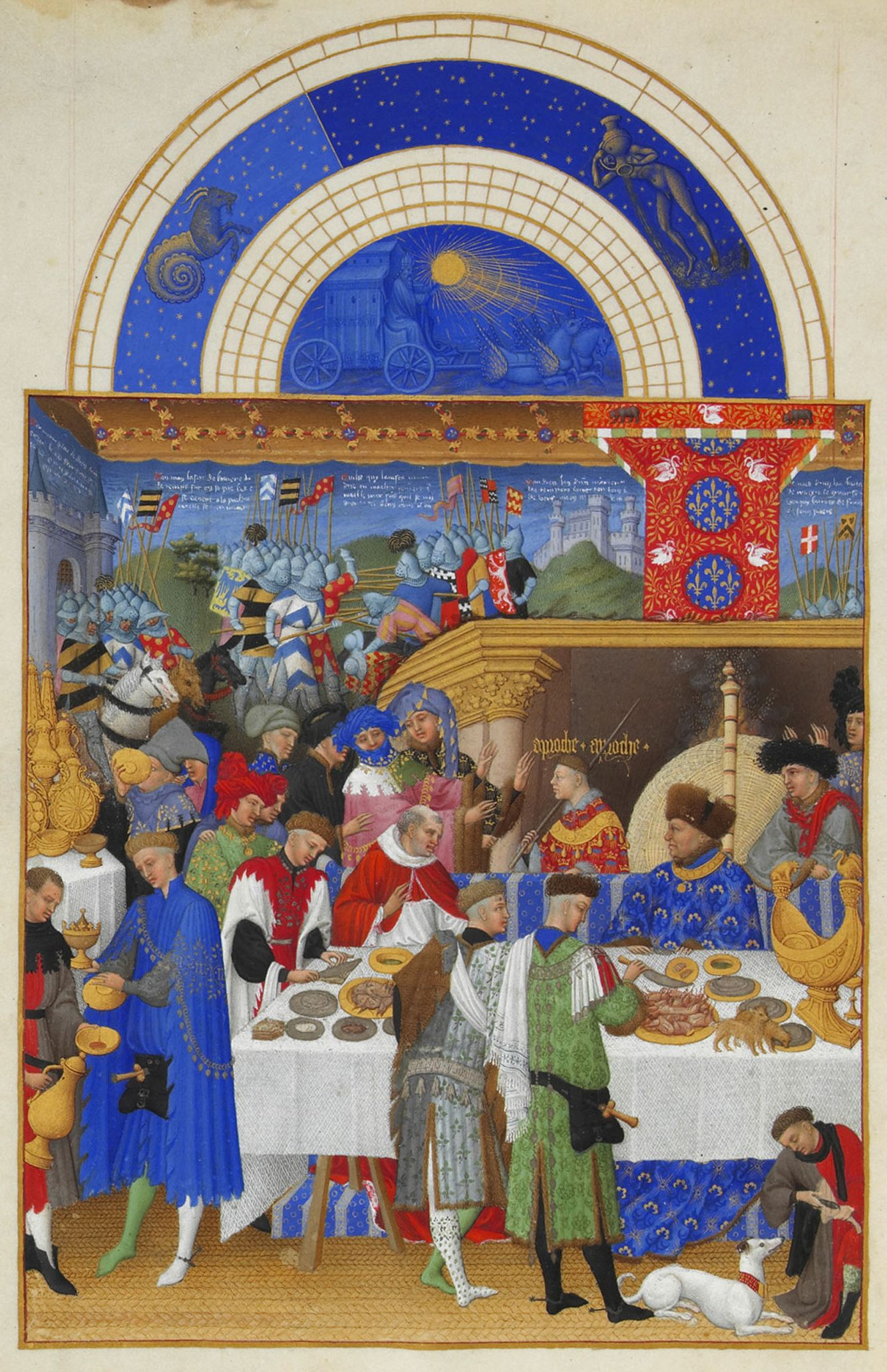
John, Duke of Berry, enjoys a grand meal, sitting at the high table in front of the fireplace, served by a carver and other servants. On the table to the Duke's left is a golden salt cellar, or nef, in the shape of a ship; Très Riches Heures du Duc de Berry, about 1410.

As with almost every part of life at the time, a medieval meal was generally a communal affair. The entire household, including servants, would ideally dine together. To sneak off to enjoy private company was considered a haughty and inefficient egotism in a world where people depended very much on each other. In the 13th century, English bishop Robert Grosseteste advised the Countess of Lincoln: "forbid dinners and suppers out of hall, in secret and in private rooms, for from this arises waste and no honor to the lord and lady." He also recommended watching that the servants not make off with leftovers to make merry at rere-suppers, rather than giving it as alms. Toward the end of the Middle Ages, the wealthy increasingly sought to escape this regime of stern collectivism. When possible, rich hosts retired with their consorts to private chambers where the meal could be enjoyed in greater exclusivity and privacy. Being invited to a lord's chambers was a great privilege and could be used as a way to reward friends and allies and to awe subordinates. It allowed lords to distance themselves further from the household and to enjoy more luxurious treats while serving inferior food to the rest of the household that still dined in the great hall. At major occasions and banquets, however, the host and hostess generally dined in the great hall with the other diners. Although there are descriptions of dining etiquette on special occasions, less is known about the details of day-to-day meals of the elite or about the table manners of the common people and the destitute. However, it can be assumed there were no such extravagant luxuries as multiple courses, luxurious spices or hand-washing in scented water in everyday meals.

Things were different for the wealthy. Before the meal and between courses, shallow basins and linen towels were offered to guests so they could wash their hands, as cleanliness was emphasized. Social codes made it difficult for women to uphold the ideal of immaculate neatness and delicacy while enjoying a meal, so the wife of the host often dined in private with her entourage or ate very little at such feasts. She could then join dinner only after the potentially messy business of eating was done. Overall, fine dining was a predominantly male affair, and it was uncommon for anyone but the most honored of guests to bring his wife or her ladies-in-waiting. The hierarchical nature of society was reinforced by etiquette where the lower ranked were expected to help the higher, the younger to assist the elder, and men to spare women the risk of sullying dress and reputation by having to handle food in an unwomanly fashion. Shared drinking cups were common even at lavish banquets for all but those who sat at the high table, as was the standard etiquette of breaking bread and carving meat for one's fellow diners.

Food was mostly served on plates or in stew pots, and diners would take their share from the dishes and place it on trenchers of stale bread, wood or pewter with the help of spoons or bare hands. In lower-class households it was common to eat food straight off the table. Knives were used at the table, but most people were expected to bring their own, and only highly favoured guests would be given a personal knife. A knife was usually shared with at least one other dinner guest, unless one was of very high rank or well acquainted with the host. Forks for eating were not in widespread usage in Europe until the early modern period, and early on were limited to Italy. Even there it was not until the 14th century that the fork became common among Italians of all social classes. The change in attitudes can be illustrated by the reactions to the table manners of the Byzantine princess Theodora Doukaina in the late 11th century. She was the wife of Domenico Selvo, the Doge of Venice, and caused considerable dismay among upstanding Venetians. The princess's insistence on having her food cut up by her eunuch servants and then eating the pieces with a golden fork shocked and upset the diners so much that there was a claim that Peter Damian, Cardinal Bishop of Ostia, later interpreted her refined foreign manners as pride and referred to her as "... the Venetian Doge's wife, whose body, after her excessive delicacy, entirely rotted away."

== Food preparation ==
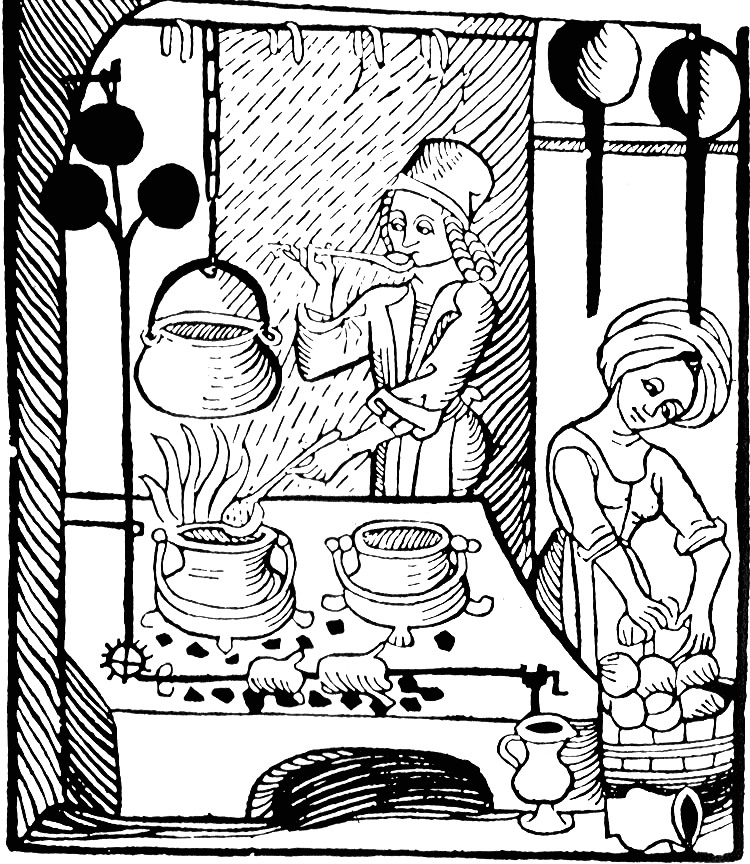
A cook at the hearth with his ladle; woodcut from the first printed cookbook in German, Kuchenmaistrey, 1485

All types of cooking were done using a fire. Kitchen stoves did not appear until the 18th century, and cooks had to know how to cook directly over an open fire. Ovens were used, but they were expensive to construct and existed only in fairly large households and bakeries. It was common for a community to have shared ownership of an oven to ensure that the bread baking essential to everyone was made communal rather than private. There were also portable ovens designed to be filled with food and then buried in hot coals, and even larger ones on wheels that were used to sell pies in the streets of medieval towns. But for most people, almost all cooking was done in simple stewpots, since this was the most efficient use of firewood and did not waste precious cooking juices, making potages and stews the most common dishes. Overall, most evidence suggests that medieval dishes had a fairly high fat content, or at least when fat could be afforded. This was considered less of a problem in a time of back-breaking toil, famine, and a greater acceptance—even desirability—of plumpness; only the poor or sick, and devout ascetics, were thin.

Fruit was readily combined with meat, fish and eggs. The recipe for Tart de brymlent, a fish pie from the recipe collection The Forme of Cury, includes a mix of figs, raisins, apples, and pears with fish (salmon, cod, or haddock) and pitted damson plums under the top crust. It was considered important to make sure that the dish agreed with contemporary standards of medicine and dietetics. This meant that food had to be "tempered" according to its nature by an appropriate combination of preparation and mixing certain ingredients, condiments and spices; fish was seen as being cold and moist, and best cooked in a way that heated and dried it, such as frying or oven baking, and seasoned with hot and dry spices; beef was dry and hot and should therefore be boiled; pork was hot and moist and should therefore always be roasted. In some recipe collections, alternative ingredients were assigned with more consideration to the humoral nature than what a modern cook would consider to be similarity in taste. In a recipe for quince pie, cabbage is said to work equally well, and in another turnips could be replaced by pears.

The completely edible shortcrust pie did not appear in recipes until the 15th century. Before that the pastry was primarily used as a cooking container in a technique known as huff paste. Extant recipe collections show that gastronomy in the Late Middle Ages developed significantly. New techniques, like the shortcrust pie and the clarification of jelly with egg whites began to appear in recipes in the late 14th century and recipes began to include detailed instructions instead of being mere memory aids to an already skilled cook.

=== Medieval kitchens ===
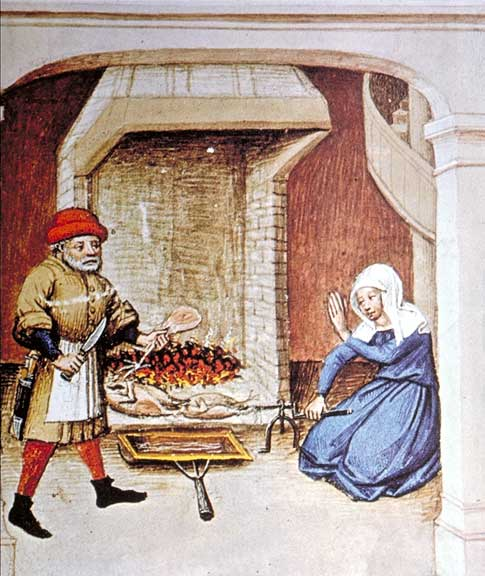
Fowl roasting on a spit. A shallow basin collects the drippings to use in sauces or for basting; The Decameron, Flanders, 1432.

In most households, cooking was done on an open hearth in the middle of the main living area, to make efficient use of the heat. This was the most common arrangement, even in wealthy households, for most of the Middle Ages, where the kitchen was combined with the dining hall. Toward the Late Middle Ages a separate kitchen area began to evolve. The first step was to move the fireplaces toward the walls of the main hall, and later to build a separate building or wing that contained a dedicated kitchen area, often separated from the main building by a covered arcade. This way, the smoke, odors and bustle of the kitchen could be kept out of sight of guests, and the fire risk lessened. Few medieval kitchens survive as they were "notoriously ephemeral structures".

Many basic variations of cooking utensils available today, such as frying pans, pots, kettles, and waffle irons, already existed, although they were often too expensive for poorer households. Other tools more specific to cooking over an open fire were spits of various sizes, and material for skewering anything from delicate quails to whole oxen. There were also cranes with adjustable hooks so that pots and cauldrons could easily be swung away from the fire to keep them from burning or boiling over. Utensils were often held directly over the fire or placed into embers on tripods. To assist the cook there were also assorted knives, stirring spoons, ladles and graters. In wealthy households one of the most common tools was the mortar and sieve cloth, since many medieval recipes called for food to be finely chopped, mashed, strained and seasoned either before or after cooking. This was based on a belief among physicians that the finer the consistency of food, the more effectively the body would absorb the nourishment. It also gave skilled cooks the opportunity to elaborately shape the results. Fine-textured food was also associated with wealth; for example, finely milled flour was expensive, while the bread of commoners was typically brown and coarse. A typical procedure was farcing (from the Latin farcio 'to cram'), to skin and dress an animal, grind up the meat and mix it with spices and other ingredients and then return it into its own skin, or mold it into the shape of a completely different animal.

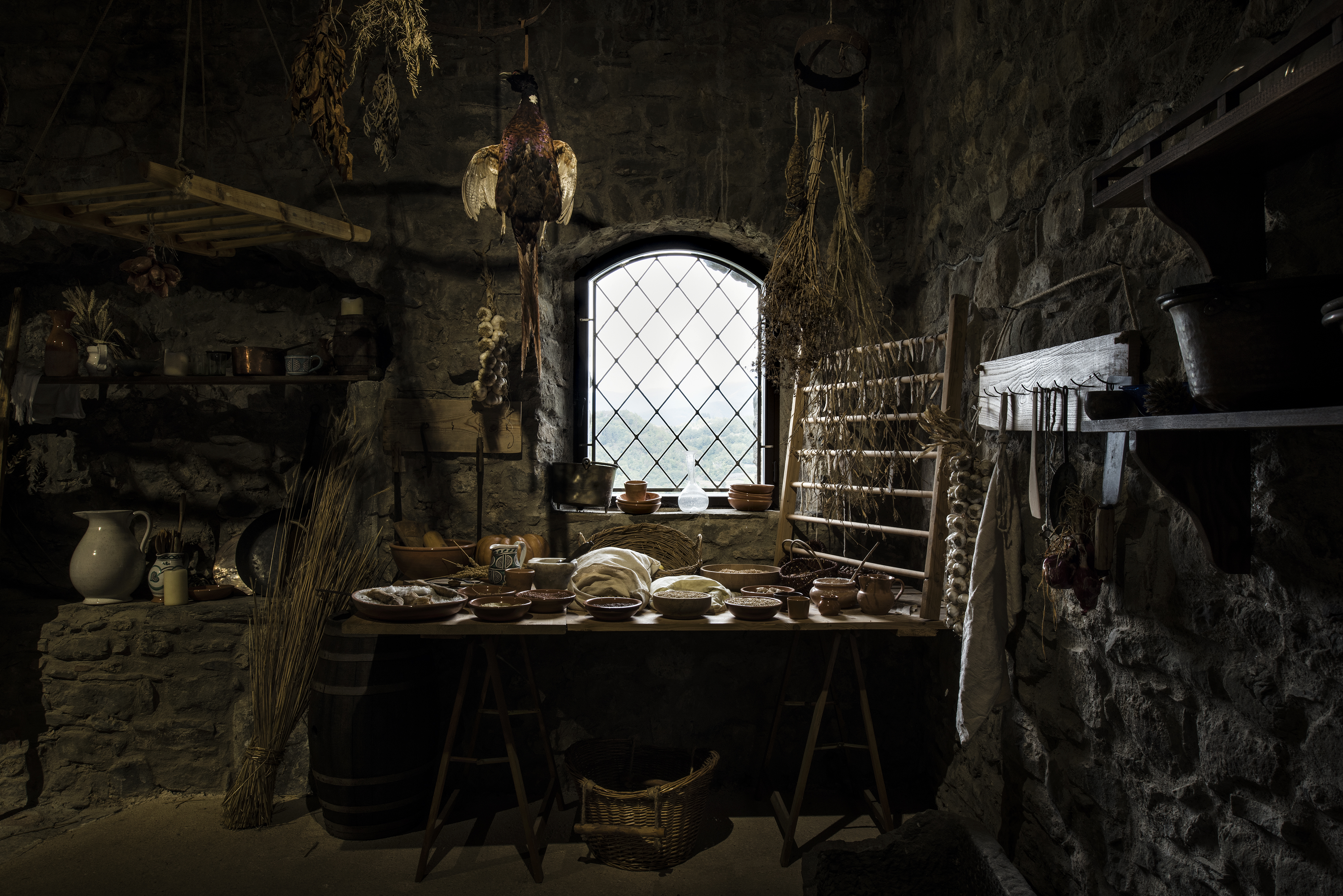
A restored medieval kitchen inside Verrucole Castle, Tuscany

The kitchen staff of huge noble or royal courts occasionally numbered in the hundreds: pantlers, bakers, waferers, sauciers, larderers, butchers, carvers, page boys, milkmaids, butlers, and numerous scullions. While an average peasant household often made do with firewood collected from the surrounding woodlands, the major kitchens of households had to cope with the logistics of providing at least two meals daily for several hundred people. Guidelines on how to prepare for a two-day banquet can be found in the cookbook Du fait de cuisine ('On cookery') written in 1420 in part to compete with the court of Burgundy by Maistre Chiquart, master chef of Duke Amadeus VIII of Savoy. Chiquart recommends that the chief cook should have at hand at least 1,000 cartloads of "good, dry firewood" and a large barnful of coal.

=== Preservation ===
Food preservation methods were basically the same as had been used since antiquity, and did not change much until the invention of canning in the early 19th century. The most common and simplest method was to expose foodstuffs to heat or wind to remove moisture, thereby prolonging the durability if not the flavor of almost any type of food from cereals to meats; the drying of food worked by drastically reducing the activity of various water-dependent microorganisms that cause decay. In warm climates this was mostly achieved by leaving food out in the sun, and in the cooler northern climates by exposure to strong winds (especially common for the preparation of stockfish), or in warm ovens, cellars, attics, and at times even in living quarters. Subjecting food to a number of chemical processes such as smoking, salting, brining, conserving, or fermenting also made it keep longer. Most of these methods had the advantage of shorter preparation times and of introducing new flavors. Smoking or salting meat of livestock butchered in autumn was a common household strategy to avoid having to feed more animals than necessary during the lean winter months. Butter tended to be heavily salted (5–10%) in order not to spoil. Vegetables, eggs, or fish were also often pickled in tightly packed jars, containing brine and acidic liquids (lemon juice, verjuice, or vinegar). Another method was to seal the food by cooking it in honey, sugar, or fat, in which it was then stored. Microbial modification was also encouraged, however, by a number of methods; grains and fruits were turned into alcoholic drinks thus killing any pathogens, and milk was fermented and curdled into a multitude of cheeses or buttermilk.

=== Professional cooking ===
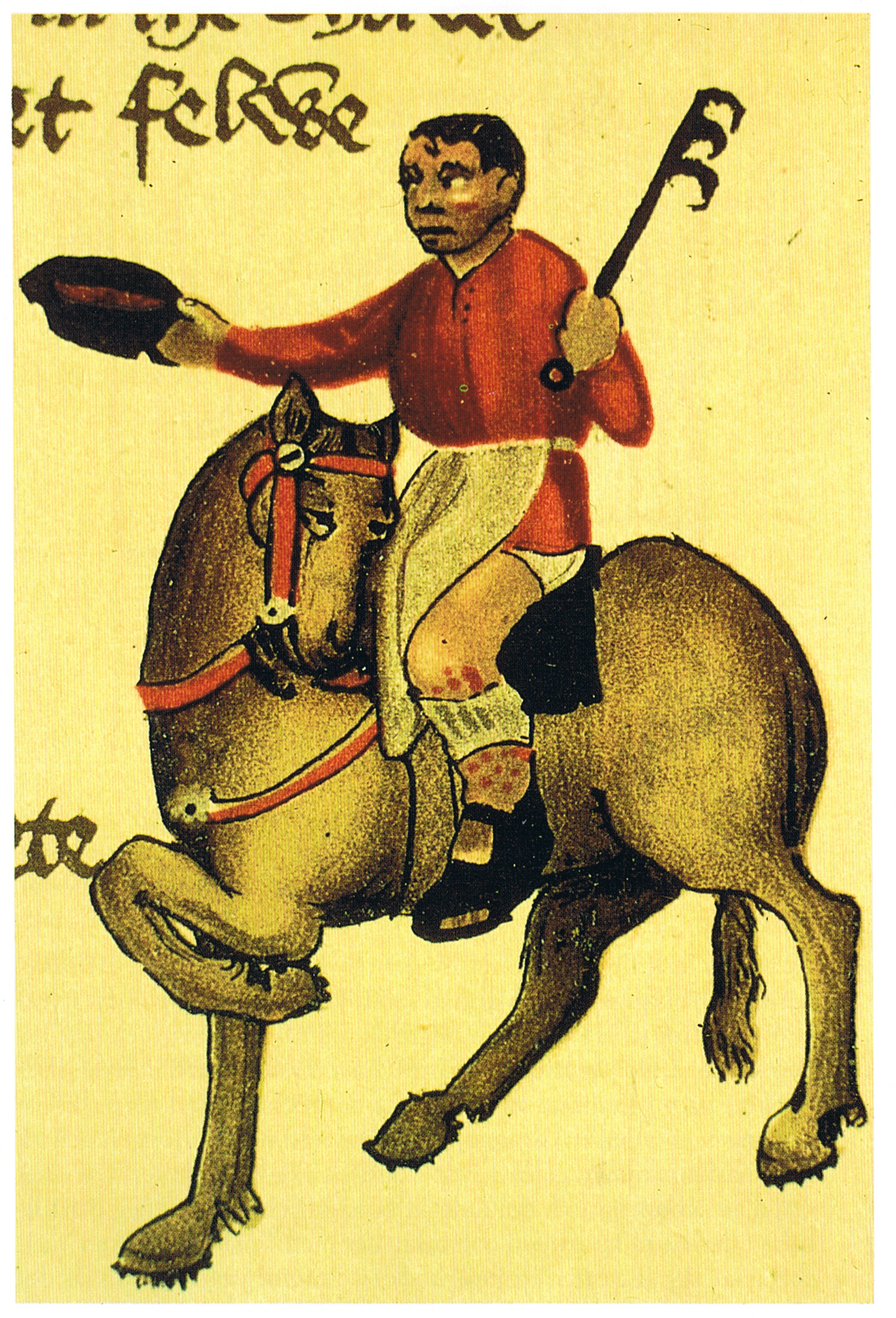
The disreputable cook from Chaucer's Canterbury Tales. The long meat hook in his left hand was one of the most common medieval cook's tools; from the Ellesmere manuscripts, about 1410.

The majority of the European population before industrialization lived in rural communities or isolated farms and households. The norm was self-sufficiency with only a small percentage of production being exported or sold in markets. Large towns were exceptions and required their surrounding hinterlands to support them with food and fuel. The dense urban population could support a wide variety of food establishments that catered to various social groups. Many of the poor city dwellers had to live in cramped conditions without access to a kitchen or even a hearth, and many did not own the equipment for basic cooking. Food from vendors was in such cases the only option. Cookshops could either sell ready-made hot food, an early form of fast food, or offer cooking services while the customers supplied some or all of the ingredients. Travelers, such as pilgrims en route to a holy site, made use of professional cooks to avoid having to carry their provisions with them. For the more affluent, there were many types of specialists that could supply various foods and condiments: cheesemongers, pie bakers, saucers, and waferers, for example. Well-off citizens who had the means to cook at home could on special occasions hire professionals when their own kitchen or staff could not handle the burden of hosting a major banquet.

Urban cookshops that catered to workers or the destitute were regarded as unsavory and disreputable places by the well-to-do and professional cooks tended to have a bad reputation. Geoffrey Chaucer's Hodge of Ware, the London cook from the Canterbury Tales, is described as a sleazy purveyor of unpalatable food. French cardinal Jacques de Vitry's sermons from the early 13th century describe sellers of cooked meat as an outright health hazard. While the necessity of the cook's services was occasionally recognized and appreciated, they were often disparaged since they catered to the baser of bodily human needs rather than spiritual betterment. The stereotypical cook in art and literature was male, hot-tempered, prone to drunkenness, and often depicted guarding his stewpot from being pilfered by both humans and animals. In the early 15th century, the English monk John Lydgate articulated the beliefs of many of his contemporaries by proclaiming that "Hoot ffir [fire] and smoke makith many an angry cook."

== Cereals ==
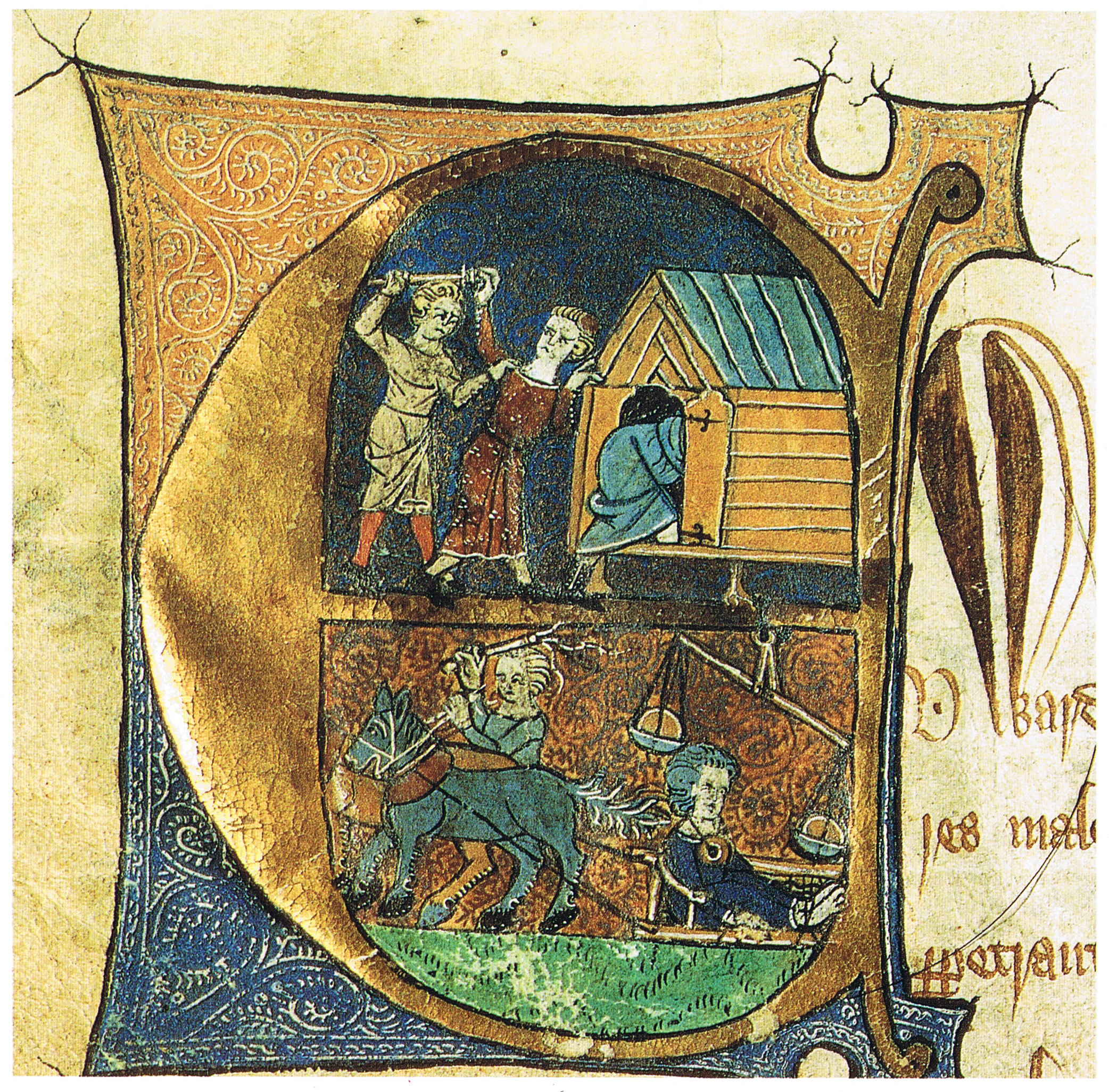
A baker caught trying to cheat customers is punished by being dragged around the community on a sleigh with the offending loaf of bread tied around his neck.

The period between 500 and 1300 saw a major change in diet that affected most of Europe. More intense agriculture on ever-increasing acreage resulted in a shift from animal products, like meat and dairy, to various grains and vegetables as the staple of the majority population. Before the 14th century, bread was not as common among the lower classes, especially in the north where wheat was more difficult to grow. A bread-based diet became gradually more common during the 15th century and replaced warm intermediate meals that were porridge- or gruel-based. Leavened bread was more common in wheat-growing regions in the south, while unleavened flatbread of barley, rye, or oats remained more common in northern and highland regions, and unleavened flatbread was also common as provisions for troops.

The most common grains were rye, barley, buckwheat, millet, and oats. Rice remained a fairly expensive import for most of the Middle Ages and was grown in northern Italy only toward the end of the period. Wheat was common all over Europe and was considered to be the most nutritious of all grains, but was more prestigious and thus more expensive. The finely sifted white flour that modern Europeans are most familiar with was reserved for the bread of the upper classes. As one descended the social ladder, bread became coarser and darker, and its bran content increased. In times of grain shortages or outright famine, grains could be supplemented with cheaper and less desirable substitutes like chestnuts, dried legumes, acorns, ferns, and a wide variety of more or less nutritious vegetable matter.

One of the common constituents of a medieval meal, either as part of a banquet or as a small snack, were sops, pieces of bread with which a liquid like wine, soup, broth, or sauce could be soaked up and eaten. Another common sight at the medieval dinner table was frumenty, a thick wheat porridge often boiled in a meat broth and seasoned with spices. Porridges were also made of every type of grain and could be served as desserts or dishes for the sick, if boiled in milk (or almond milk) and sweetened with sugar. Pies filled with meats, eggs, vegetables, or fruit were common throughout Europe, as were turnovers, fritters, doughnuts, and many similar pastries. Grain, either as bread crumbs or flour, was also the most common thickener of soups and stews, alone or in combination with almond milk. By the Late Middle Ages biscuits (cookies in the U.S. and Canada) and especially wafers, eaten for dessert, had become high-prestige foods and came in many varieties.

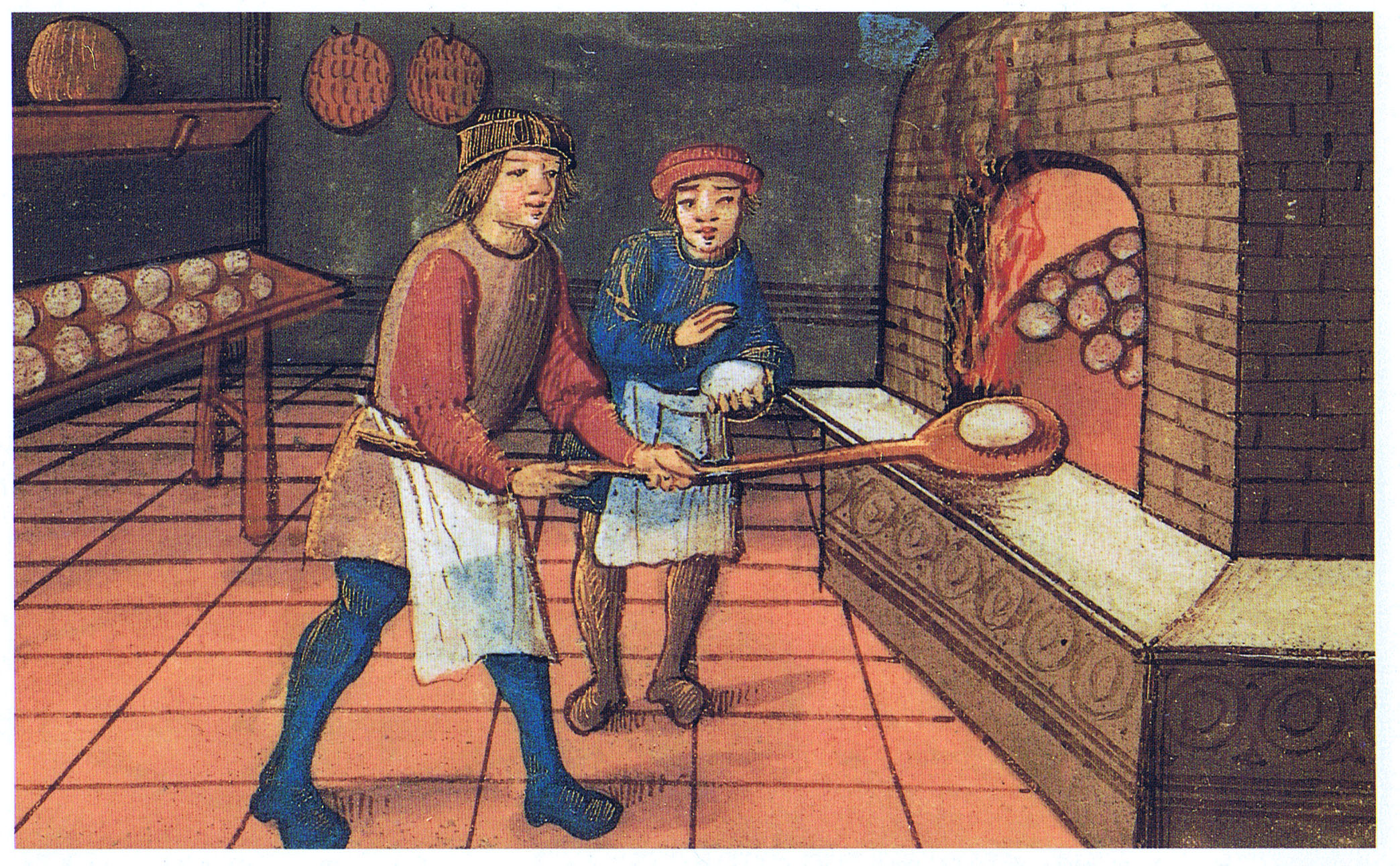
A baker with his assistant making bread rolls or manchets; from a book of hours manuscript from about 1500

The importance of bread as a daily staple meant that bakers played a crucial role in any medieval community. Bread consumption was high in most of Western Europe by the 14th century. Estimates of bread consumption from different regions are fairly similar: around 1 to 1.5 kilograms (2.2 to 3.3 lb) of bread per person per day. Among the first town guilds to be organized were the bakers, and laws and regulations were passed to keep bread prices stable. The English Assize of Bread and Ale of 1266 listed extensive tables where the size, weight, and price of a loaf of bread were regulated in relation to grain prices. The baker's profit margin stipulated in the tables was later increased through successful lobbying from the London Baker's Company by adding the cost of everything from firewood and salt to the baker's wife, house, and dog. Since bread was such a central part of the medieval diet, swindling by those who were trusted with supplying the precious commodity to the community was considered a serious offense. Bakers who were caught tampering with weights or adulterating dough with less expensive ingredients could receive severe penalties. This gave rise to the "baker's dozen": a baker would give 13 for the price of 12, to be certain of not being known as a cheat.

== Fruits and vegetables ==
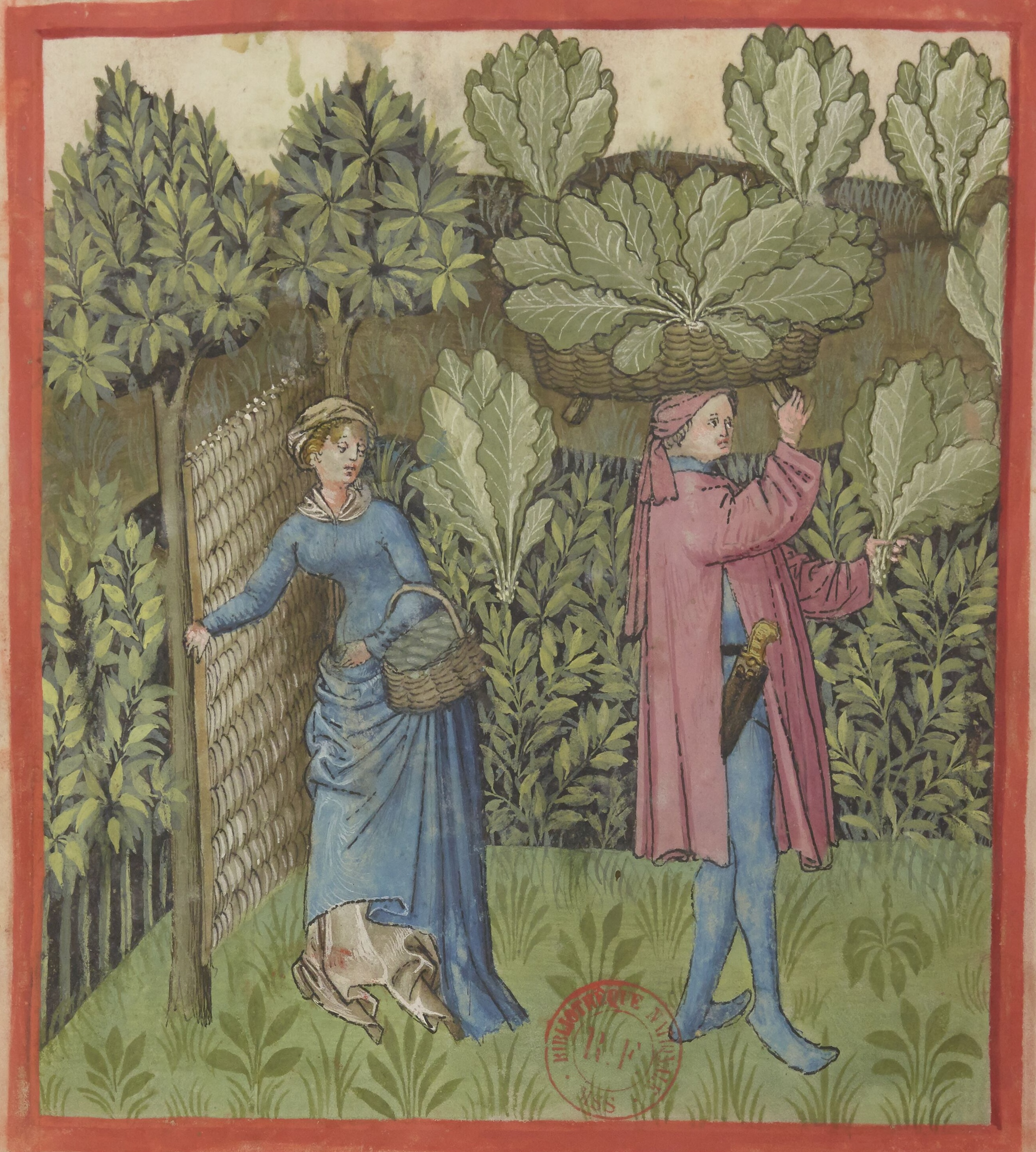
Harvesting cabbage; Tacuinum Sanitatis, 15th century

Plant-based foods, such as fruits, vegetables, nuts, and herbs, varied in consumption with seasonal changes. The facility with which these goods could be supplied relied heavily on environmental and practical obstacles like storage capacity, changes in weather, and crop growth. In the later medieval period, increased urbanization provided more of the population with access to diverse fruits and vegetables as a result of trade.

Fruits were popular and could be served fresh, dried, or preserved, and were a common ingredient in many cooked dishes. Since honey and sugar were both expensive, it was common to include many types of fruit in dishes that called for sweeteners of some sort. The fruits of choice in the south were lemons, citrons, bitter oranges (the sweet type was not introduced until several hundred years later), pomegranates, quinces, and grapes. Farther north, apples, pears, plums, and wild strawberries were more common. Figs and dates were eaten all over Europe, but remained rather expensive imports in the north.

While grains were the primary constituent of most meals, vegetables, such as cabbage, chard, onions, garlic, and carrots, were common foodstuffs. Many of these were eaten daily by peasants and workers and were less prestigious than meat. Cookbooks, which appeared in the late Middle Ages and were intended mostly for those who could afford such luxuries, contained only a small number of recipes using vegetables as the main ingredient. The lack of recipes for many basic vegetable dishes, such as potages, has been interpreted not to mean that they were absent from the meals of the nobility, but rather that they were considered so basic that they did not require recording. Carrots were available in many variants during the Middle Ages: among them a tastier reddish-purple variety and a less prestigious green-yellow type. Various legumes, such as chickpeas, fava beans, and field peas were also common and important sources of protein, especially among the lower classes. With the exception of peas, legumes were often viewed with some suspicion by the dietitians advising the upper class, partly because of their tendency to cause flatulence but also because they were associated with the coarse food of peasants. The importance of vegetables to the common people is illustrated by accounts from 16th century Germany stating that many peasants ate sauerkraut three or four times a day.

Common and often basic ingredients in many modern European cuisines, such as potatoes, kidney beans, cacao, vanilla, tomatoes, chili peppers, and maize, were not available to Europeans until after 1492, after European contact with the Americas. Even after their wider availability in Europe, it often took considerable time (sometimes several centuries) for the new foodstuffs to be accepted by society at large.

The incorporation of nuts within the medieval diet was largely a result of the notable ease with which they could be stored. Additionally, their caloric density made them ideal to mitigate exhaustion from periods of labor. Thus, they were widely relied upon as a nutritious food source in times of emergencies. Nuts could be found growing wild or in cultivated royal estates. Such nuts included almonds, chestnuts, walnuts, and filberts. As sources of food supplies in densely populated areas became largely dependent on royal or clerical estates, exploitation resulted in nutritional consequences for poorer folk. Thus, the foraging of nuts in less expansive regions of agriculture functioned as an advantage within smaller communities. Nuts were incorporated in many kinds of recipes. Featured often in many parts of the medieval diet, they were used in dishes like muesli or eaten alongside vegetables like kale. Hazelnuts in particular are present in many archaeological and historical records.

Imported foreign goods from the Continent and the Mediterranean were common amongst the wealthy in medieval Ireland. Walnuts and almonds were frequently preserved and consumed along with dried fruits. Households in England with the financial means would seasonally consume fruits and nuts to compensate for the dietary restrictions of Lent. This tradition persisted long after the medieval ages, as raisins and hazelnuts were consumed in tandem during periods of fasting into the eighteenth century.

== Dairy products ==
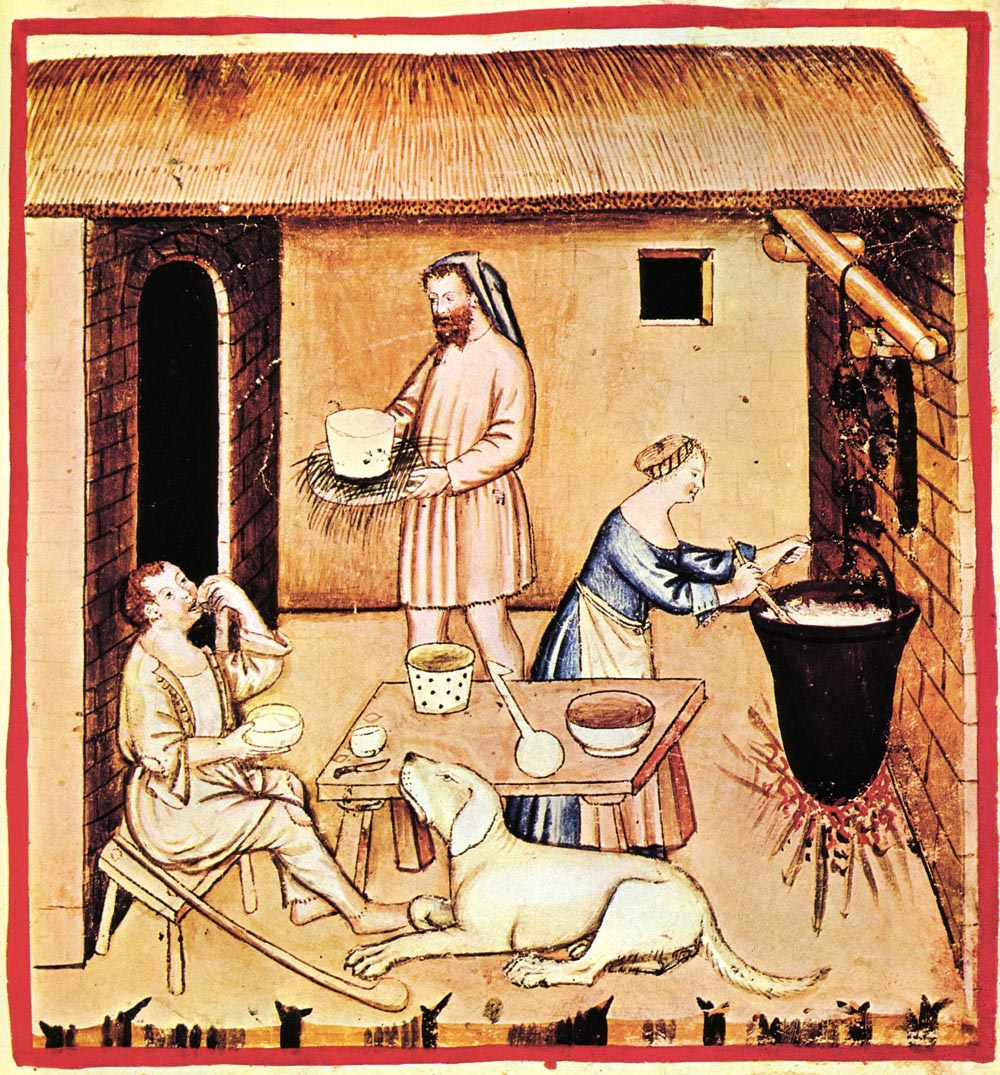
Preparing and serving cheese; Tacuinum Sanitatis, 14th century

Milk was an important source of animal protein for those who could not afford meat. It would mostly come from cows, but milk from goats and sheep was also common. Plain fresh milk was not consumed by adults except the poor or sick, and was usually reserved for the very young or elderly. Poor adults would sometimes drink buttermilk or whey or milk that was soured or watered down. Fresh milk was overall less common than other dairy products because of the lack of technology to keep it from spoiling. On occasion, it was used in upper-class kitchens in stews, but it was difficult to keep fresh in bulk, and almond milk was generally used in its place.

Cheese was far more important as a foodstuff, especially for common people, and it has been suggested that it was, during many periods, the chief supplier of animal protein among the lower classes. Many varieties of cheese eaten today, like Dutch Edam, Northern French Brie and Italian Parmesan, were available and well known in late medieval times. There were also whey cheeses, like ricotta, made from by-products of the production of harder cheeses. Cheese was used in cooking for pies and soups, the latter being common fare in German-speaking areas. Butter, another important dairy product, was in popular use in the regions of Northern Europe that specialized in cattle production in the latter half of the Middle Ages, the Low Countries and Southern Scandinavia. While most other regions used oil or lard as cooking fats, butter was the dominant cooking medium in these areas. Its production also allowed for a lucrative butter export from the 12th century onward.

== Meats ==
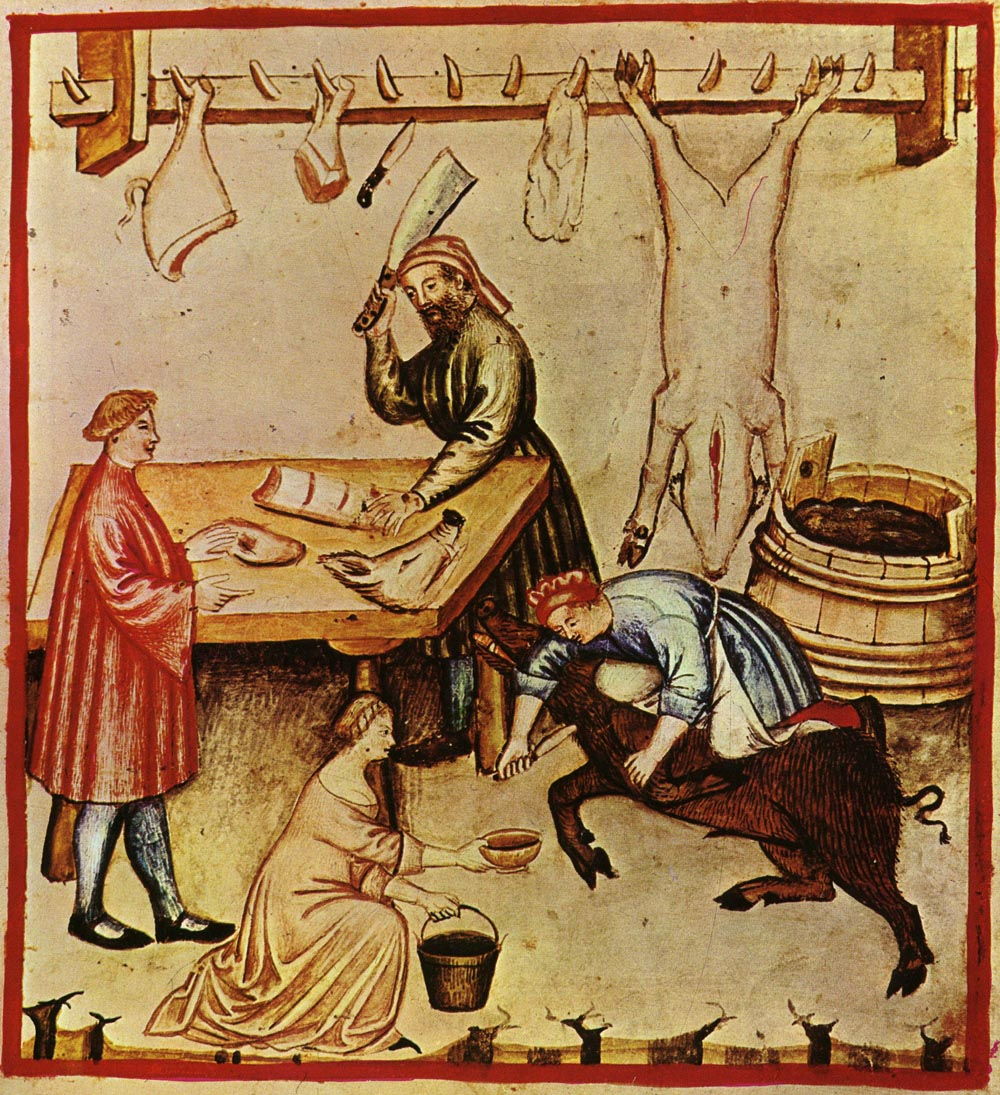
A 14th-century butcher shop. A large pig is being bled in preparation for slaughter. A whole pig carcass and cuts are hanging from a rack and various cuts are being prepared for a customer.

While all forms of wild game were popular among those who could obtain it, most meat came from domestic animals. Domestic working animals that were no longer able to work were slaughtered but not particularly appetizing and therefore were less valued as meat. Beef was not as common as today because raising cattle was labor-intensive, requiring pastures and feed, and oxen and cows were much more valuable as draught animals and for producing milk. Lamb and mutton were fairly common, especially in areas with a sizeable wool industry, as was veal. Goat meat was consumed in some parts of medieval Europe. Far more common was pork, as domestic pigs required less attention and cheaper feed. Domestic pigs often ran freely even in towns and could be fed on just about any organic waste, and suckling pig was a sought-after delicacy. Just about every part of the pig was eaten, including ears, snout, tail, tongue, and womb. The intestines, bladder, and stomach could be used as casings for sausage or even illusion food such as giant eggs. Among the meats that today are rare or even considered inappropriate for human consumption are the hedgehog and porcupine, occasionally mentioned in late medieval recipe collections. Rabbits remained a rare and highly prized commodity. In England, they were deliberately introduced by the 13th century and their colonies were carefully protected. Further south, domesticated rabbits were commonly bred and raised both for their meat and fur. It is frequently and falsely claimed that they were of particular value for monasteries because newborn rabbits were allegedly declared fish (or at least not meat) by church officials, allowing them to be eaten during Lent.

A wide range of birds were eaten, including pheasants, swans, peafowl, quail, partridge, storks, cranes, pigeons, larks, finches, and just about any other wild bird that could be captured. Swans and peafowl were domesticated to some extent, but were eaten only by the social elite, and more praised for their fine appearance as stunning entertainment dishes, entremets, than for their meat. As today, ducks and geese had been domesticated but were not as popular as the chicken, the poultry equivalent of the pig. The barnacle goose was believed to reproduce not by laying eggs like other birds, but by growing in barnacles, and was therefore considered acceptable food for fasting and Lent. But at the Fourth Council of the Lateran (1215), Pope Innocent III explicitly prohibited the eating of barnacle geese during Lent, arguing that they lived and fed like ducks and so were of the same nature as other birds.

Meats were more expensive than plant foods and could be up to four times as expensive as bread. Fish was up to 16 times as costly, and was expensive even for coastal populations. This meant that fasts could mean an especially meager diet for those who could not afford alternatives to meat and animal products like milk and eggs. It was only after the Black Death had eradicated up to half of the European population that meat became more common even for poorer people. The drastic reduction in many populated areas resulted in a labor shortage, meaning that wages dramatically increased. It also left vast areas of farmland untended, making it available for pasture and putting more meat on the market.

=== Fish and seafood ===
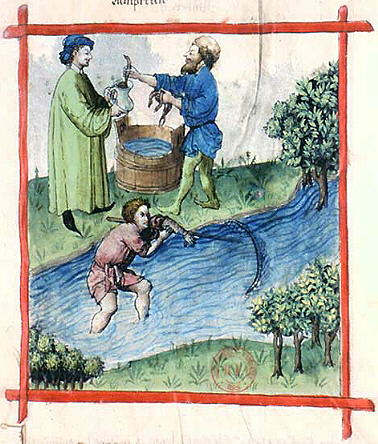
Fishing for lampreys in a stream; Tacuinum Sanitatis, 15th century

Although less prestigious than other animal meats, and often seen as merely an alternative to meat on fast days, seafood was the mainstay of many coastal populations. "Fish" to the medieval person was also a general name for anything not considered a proper land-living animal, including marine mammals such as whales and porpoises. Also included were the beaver, due to its scaly tail and considerable time spent in water, and barnacle geese, due to the belief that they developed underwater in the form of barnacles. Such foods were also considered appropriate for fast days, though the rather contrived classification of barnacle geese as fish was not universally accepted. The Holy Roman Emperor Frederick II examined barnacles and noted no evidence of any bird-like embryo in them, and the secretary of Leo of Rozmital wrote a very skeptical account of his reaction to being served barnacle goose at a fish-day dinner in 1456.

Especially important was the fishing and trade in herring and cod in the Atlantic and the Baltic Sea. The herring was of unprecedented significance to the economy of much of Northern Europe, and it was one of the most common commodities traded by the Hanseatic League, a powerful north German alliance of trading guilds. Kippers made from herring caught in the North Sea could be found in markets as far away as Constantinople. While large quantities of fish were eaten fresh, a large proportion was salted, dried, and, to a lesser extent, smoked. Stockfish, cod that was split down the middle, fixed to a pole and dried, was very common, though preparation could be time-consuming, and meant beating the dried fish with a mallet before soaking it in water. A wide range of mollusks, including oysters, mussels, and scallops, were eaten by coastal and river-dwelling populations, and freshwater crayfish were seen as a desirable alternative to meat during fish days. Compared to meat, fish was much more expensive for inland populations, especially in Central Europe, and therefore not an option for most. Freshwater fish such as eel, pike, carp, bream, perch, lamprey, salmon, and trout were common.

== Drink ==
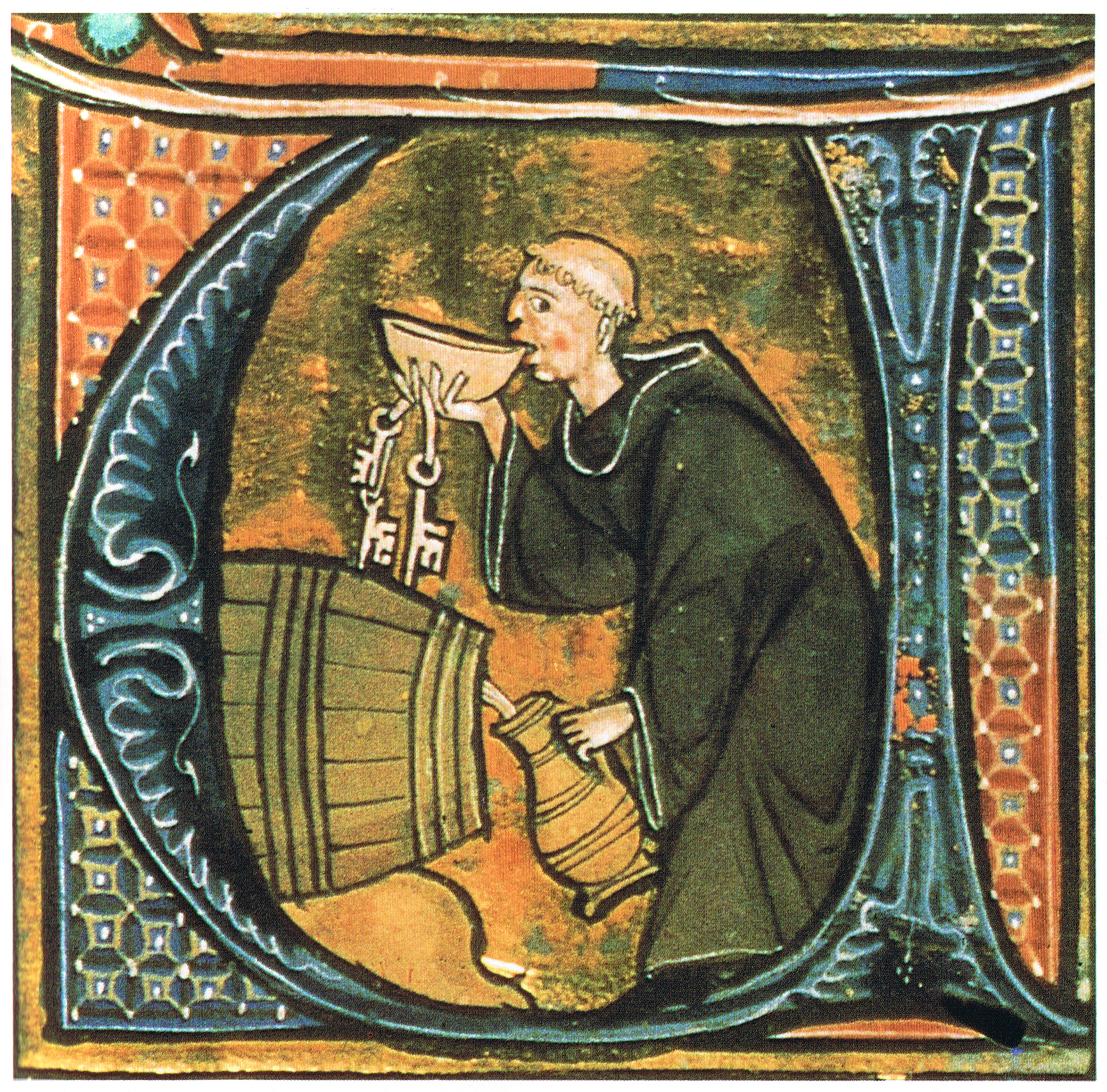
An abbey cellarer testing his wine. Illumination from a copy of Li livres dou santé by Aldobrandino of Siena. British Library, Sloane 2435, f. 44v.

While water is often drunk with a meal in modern times, in the Middle Ages concerns over purity, medical recommendations, and its low prestige value made it less favored. As such, alcoholic beverages were preferred. Such beverages contributed to many components of late-medieval life. Alcohol was often consumed throughout the day, and drinks were expected to accompany any social occasion. Rituals, rites, and festivals entailed the consumption of alcohol, which would often be distributed by officials. The different forms of alcohol popularized throughout various regions all contributed to a substantial portion of the population's caloric intake, and were highly significant to diet and survival. The consumption of alcohol was also perceived to be a necessity in conserving one's physical health. It was seen as more nutritious and beneficial to digestion than water, with the invaluable bonus of being less prone to putrefaction due to the alcohol content. Wine was consumed on a daily basis in most of France and all over the Western Mediterranean wherever grapes were cultivated. Further north it remained the preferred drink of the bourgeoisie and the nobility who could afford it, and far less common among peasants and workers. The drink of commoners in the northern parts of the continent was primarily beer or ale.

Juices, as well as wines, of a multitude of fruits and berries had been known at least since Roman antiquity and were still consumed in the Middle Ages, including those of pomegranate, mulberry, and blackberry. Perry and cider were especially popular in the north, where both apples and pears were plentiful. Medieval drinks that have survived to this day include prunellé from wild plums (modern-day slivovitz), mulberry gin and blackberry wine. Many variants of mead have been found in medieval recipes, with or without alcoholic content. However, the honey-based drink became less common as a table beverage towards the end of the period and was eventually relegated to medicinal use. Mead has often been presented as the common drink of the Slavs. This is partially true since mead bore great symbolic value at important occasions. When agreeing on treaties and other important affairs of state, mead was often presented as a ceremonial gift. It was also common at weddings and baptismal parties, though in limited quantity due to its high price. In medieval Poland, mead had a status equivalent to that of imported luxuries, such as spices and wines. Kumis, the fermented milk of mares or camels, was known in Europe, but as with mead was mostly something prescribed by physicians.

Plain milk was not consumed by adults except the poor or sick, being reserved for the very young or elderly, and then usually as buttermilk or whey. Fresh milk was overall less common than other dairy products because of the lack of technology to keep it from spoiling. Tea and coffee, both made from plants found in the Old World, were popular in East Asia and the Muslim world during the Middle Ages. However, neither of these non-alcoholic social drinks were consumed in Europe before the late 16th and early 17th centuries.

=== Wine ===
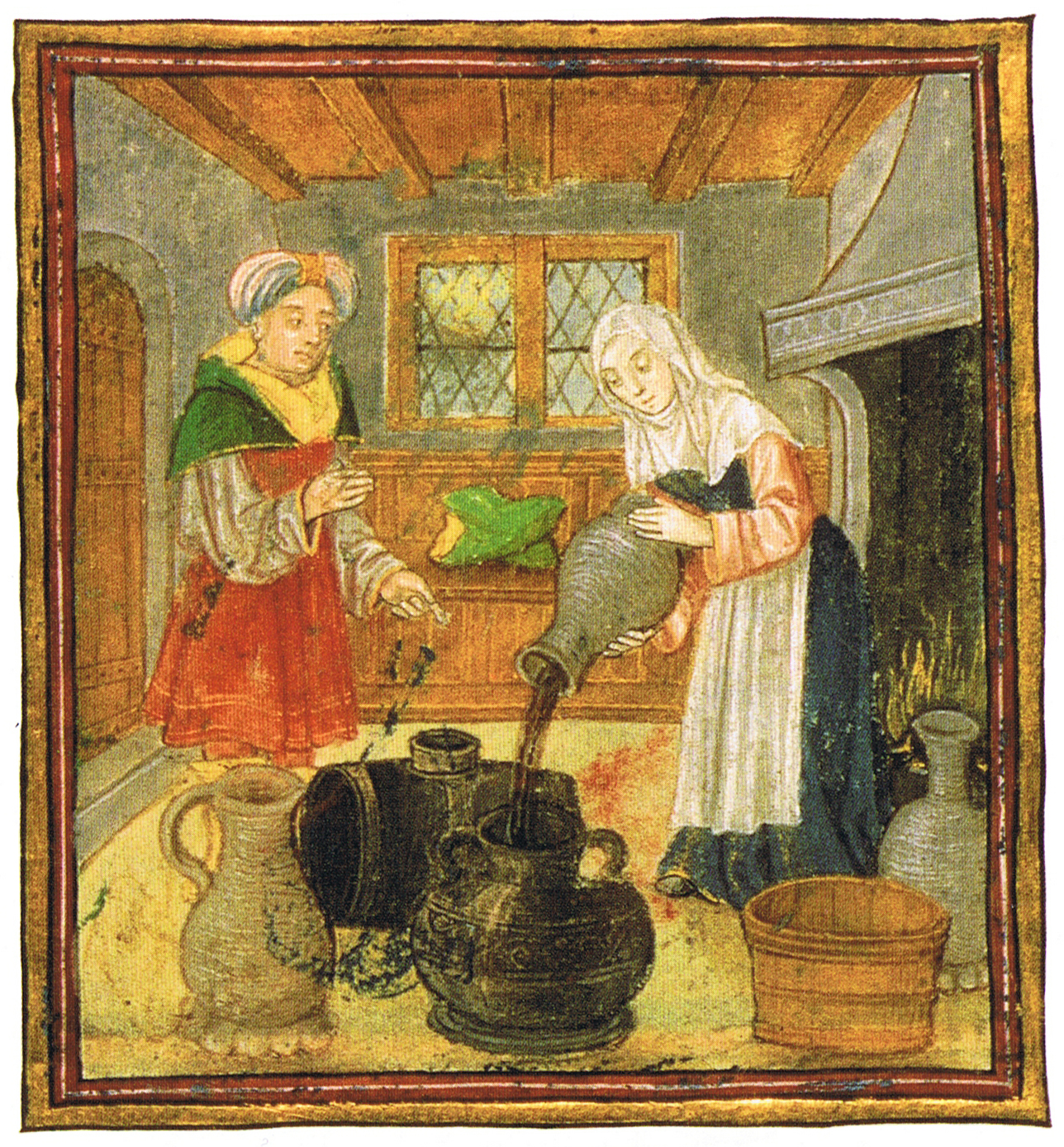
A matron demonstrates how to properly treat and conserve wine.

Wine was commonly drunk and was also regarded as the most prestigious and healthy choice. According to Galen's dietetics, it was considered hot and dry; however, these qualities were moderated when wine was watered down. Unlike water or beer, which were considered cold and moist, consumption of wine in moderation (especially red wine) was, among other things, believed to aid digestion, generate good blood and brighten the mood. The quality of wine differed considerably according to vintage, the type of grape and more importantly, the number of grape pressings. The first pressing was made into the finest and most expensive wines which were reserved for the upper classes. The second and third pressings were subsequently of lower quality and alcohol content. Common folk usually had to settle for a cheap white or rosé from a second or even third pressing, meaning that it could be consumed in quite generous amounts without leading to heavy intoxication. For the poorest (or the most pious), watered-down vinegar (similar to Ancient Roman posca) would often be the only available choice. Wine was widely consumed across medieval Europe. It maintained its status in Italy as the reigning beverage over other forms of alcohol with little divergence. Wine consumption in Italian towns of the late medieval period reached figures of up to 415 liters annually per capita, as compared to a modern value of about 60.

The aging of high-quality red wine required specialized knowledge as well as expensive storage and equipment, and resulted in an even more expensive end product. Judging from the advice given in many medieval documents on how to salvage wine that bore signs of going bad, preservation must have been a widespread problem. Even if vinegar was a common ingredient, there was only so much of it that could be used. The 14th-century cookbook Le Viandier describes several methods for salvaging spoiling wine; making sure that the wine barrels are always topped up or adding a mixture of dried and boiled white grape seeds with the ash of dried and burnt lees of white wine were both effective bactericides, even if the chemical processes were not understood at the time. Spiced or mulled wine was not only popular among the affluent, but was also considered especially healthy by physicians. Wine was believed to act as a kind of vaporizer and conduit of other foodstuffs to every part of the body, and the addition of fragrant and exotic spices would make it even more wholesome. Spiced wines were usually made by mixing an ordinary (red) wine with an assortment of spices such as ginger, cardamom, pepper, grains of paradise, nutmeg, cloves and sugar. These would be contained in small bags which were either steeped in wine or had liquid poured over them to produce hypocras and claré. By the 14th century, bagged spice mixes could be bought ready-made from spice merchants.

Conventional, well-prepared wines of the time did not differ tremendously in strength from current figures. The alcoholic content of such wine is estimated to be between 5 and 11 percent alcohol by volume, as compared to a range of 11 to 13 percent in modern wines. While there is speculation that the French mixed water with their wine and thus decreased the alcoholic content by volume, one account from a thirteenth century Franciscan friar denounced the French for drinking undiluted wine, suggesting that it was not abnormal for wine to be consumed straight.

=== Beer ===
While wine was the most common table beverage in much of Europe, this was not the case in the northern regions where grapes were not cultivated. Those who could afford it drank imported wine; even for nobility in these areas, however, it was common to drink beer or ale, particularly toward the end of the Middle Ages. In England, the Low Countries, northern Germany, Poland and Scandinavia, beer was consumed on a daily basis by people of all social classes and age groups. By the mid-15th century, barley, a cereal known to be somewhat poorly suited for breadmaking but excellent for brewing, accounted for 27% of all cereal acreage in England. However, the heavy influence from Arab and Mediterranean culture on medical science (particularly due to the Reconquista and the influx of Arabic texts) meant that beer was often disfavoured. For most medieval Europeans, it was a humble brew compared with common southern drinks and cooking ingredients, such as wine, lemons and olive oil. Even comparatively exotic products like camel milk and gazelle meat generally received more positive attention in medical texts. Beer was just an acceptable alternative and was assigned various negative qualities. In 1256, the Sienese physician Aldobrandino described beer in the following way:

But from whichever it is made, whether from oats, barley or wheat, it harms the head and the stomach, it causes bad breath and ruins the teeth, it fills the stomach with bad fumes, and as a result anyone who drinks it along with wine becomes drunk quickly; but it does have the property of facilitating urination and makes one's flesh white and smooth.

The intoxicating effect of beer was believed to last longer than that of wine, but it was also admitted that it did not create the "false thirst" associated with wine. Though less prominent than in the north, beer was consumed in northern France and the Italian mainland. Perhaps as a consequence of the Norman Conquest and the travelling of nobles between France and England, one French variant described in the 14th century cookbook Le Menagier de Paris was called godale (most likely a direct borrowing from the English 'good ale') and was made from barley and spelt, but without hops. In England there were also the variants poset ale, made from hot milk and cold ale, and brakot or braggot, a spiced honey ale prepared much like hypocras.

That hops could be used for flavoring beer had been known at least since Carolingian times, but was adopted gradually due to difficulties in establishing the appropriate proportions. Before the widespread use of hops, gruit, a mix of various herbs, had been used. Gruit had the same preserving properties as hops but could be less reliable depending on which herbs were in it; as such, the end result was much more variable. Another flavoring method was to increase the alcohol content, but this was more expensive and lent the beer the undesired characteristic of being a quick and heavy intoxicant. Hops may have been widely used in England in the tenth century; they were grown in Austria by 1208 and in Finland by 1249, and possibly much earlier.

Before hops became popular as an ingredient, it was difficult to preserve this beverage for any time, so it was mostly consumed fresh, though there are references to the use of hops in beer as early as 822 AD. It was unfiltered, and therefore cloudy, and likely had a lower alcohol content than the typical modern equivalent. Quantities of beer consumed by medieval residents of Europe, as recorded in contemporary literature, far exceed intakes in the modern world. For example, sailors in 16th-century England and Denmark received a ration of 1 imperial gallon (4.5 L; 1.2 US gal) of beer per day. Polish peasants consumed up to 3 litres (0.66 imp gal; 0.79 US gal) of beer per day.

In the Early Middle Ages, beer was brewed primarily in monasteries, and on a smaller scale, in individual households. By the High Middle Ages, breweries in the fledgling medieval towns of northern Germany began to take over production. Though most of the breweries were small family businesses that employed at most eight to ten people, regular production allowed for investment in better equipment and increased experimentation with new recipes and brewing techniques. These operations later spread to the Netherlands in the 14th century, then to Flanders and Brabant, and reached England by the 15th century. Hopped beer became very popular in the last decades of the Late Middle Ages. In England and the Low Countries, the per capita annual consumption was around 275 to 300 litres (60 to 66 imp gal; 73 to 79 US gal), and it was consumed with practically every meal: low alcohol-content beers for breakfast, and stronger ones later in the day. When perfected as an ingredient, hops could make beer keep for six months or more, and facilitated extensive exports. In late medieval England, the word beer came to mean a hopped beverage, whereas ale had to be unhopped. In turn, ale or beer was classified as "strong" or "small", the latter less intoxicating, regarded as a drink of temperate people, and suitable for consumption by children. As late as 1693, John Locke stated that the only drink he considered suitable for children of all ages was small beer, while criticizing the apparently common practice among Englishmen of the time to give their children wine and strong alcohol.

By modern standards, the brewing process was relatively inefficient, but capable of producing quite strong alcohol when that was desired. A 1998 attempt to recreate medieval English "strong ale" using recipes and techniques of the era (albeit with the use of modern yeast strains) yielded a strongly alcoholic brew with original gravity of 1.091 (corresponding to a potential alcohol content over 9%) and "pleasant, apple-like taste".

=== Distillates ===
The ancient Greeks and Romans knew of the technique of distillation, but it was not practiced on a major scale in Europe until after the invention of alembics, which feature in manuscripts from the ninth century onward. Distillation was believed by medieval scholars to produce the essence of the liquid being purified, and the term aqua vitae ('water of life') was used as a generic term for all kinds of distillates. The early use of various distillates, alcoholic or not, was varied, but it was primarily culinary or medicinal; grape syrup mixed with sugar and spices was prescribed for a variety of ailments, and rosewater was used as a perfume and cooking ingredient and for hand washing. Alcoholic distillates were also occasionally used to create dazzling, fire-breathing entremets (a type of entertainment dish after a course) by soaking a piece of cotton in spirits. It would then be placed in the mouth of the stuffed, cooked and occasionally redressed animals, and lit just before presenting the creation.

Aqua vitae in its alcoholic forms was highly praised by medieval physicians. In 1309, Arnaldus of Villanova wrote that "[i]t prolongs good health, dissipates superfluous humours, reanimates the heart and maintains youth." In the Late Middle Ages, the production of moonshine started to pick up, especially in the German-speaking regions. By the 13th century, Hausbrand (literally 'home-burnt' from gebrannter wein, brandwein 'burnt [distilled] wine') was commonplace, marking the origin of brandy. Toward the end of the Late Middle Ages, the consumption of spirits became so ingrained even among the general population that restrictions on sales and production began to appear in the late 15th century. In 1496, the city of Nuremberg issued restrictions on the selling of aquavit on Sundays and official holidays.

== Herbs, spices, and condiments ==
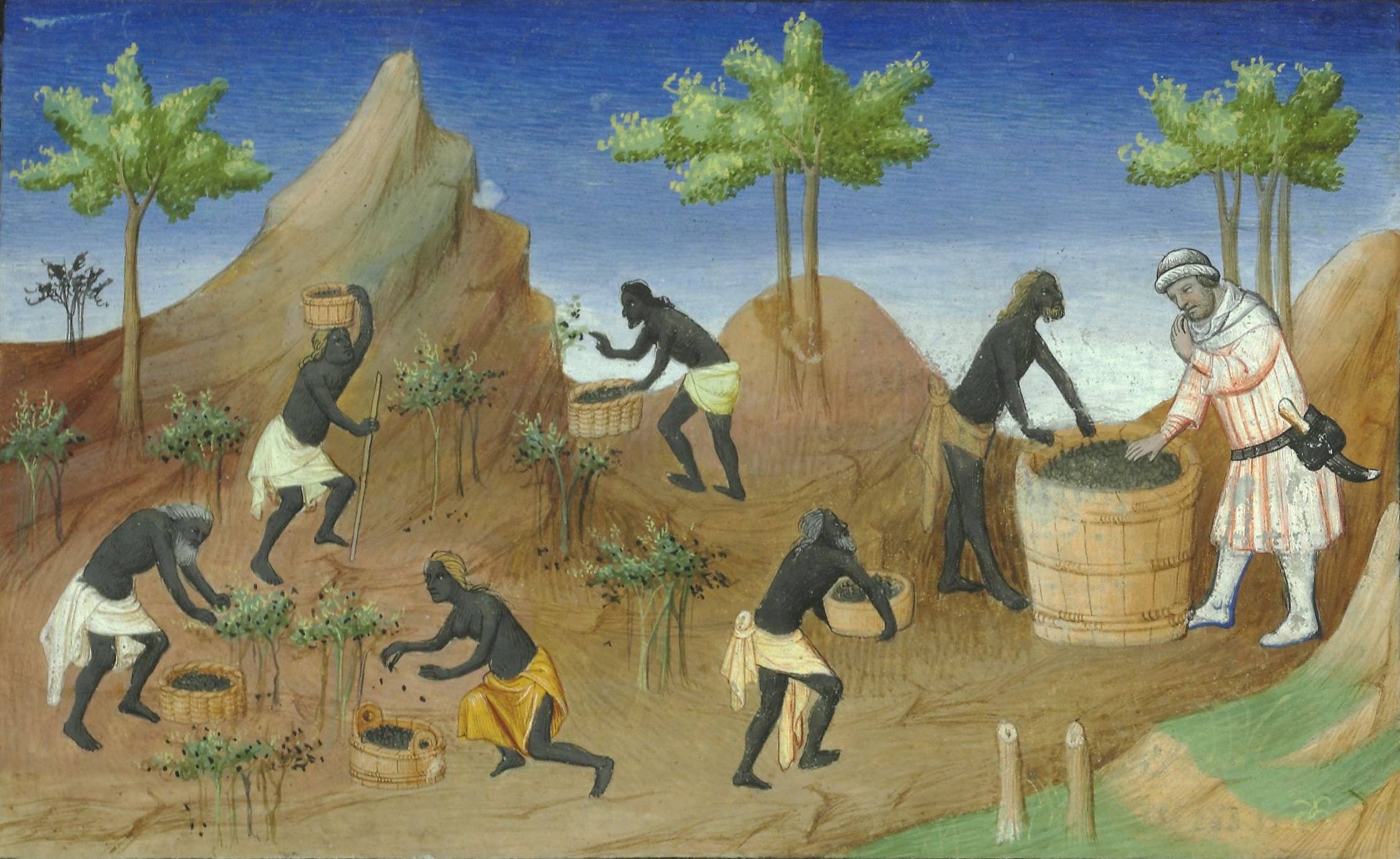
Harvesting pepper; French manuscript of The Travels of Marco Polo, early 15th century

Spices were among the most luxurious products available in the Middle Ages, the most common being black pepper, cinnamon (and the cheaper alternative cassia), cumin, nutmeg, ginger, and cloves. They all had to be imported from plantations in Asia and Africa, which made them extremely expensive, and gave them social cachet such that pepper, for example, was hoarded, traded and conspicuously donated in the manner of gold bullion. It has been estimated that around 1,000 tons of pepper and 1,000 tons of the other common spices were imported into Western Europe each year during the late Middle Ages. The value of these goods was the equivalent of a yearly supply of grain for 1.5 million people. While pepper was the most common spice, the most exclusive (though not the most obscure in its origin) was saffron, used as much for its vivid yellow-red color as for its flavor, for according to the humours, yellow signified hot and dry, valued qualities; turmeric provided a yellow substitute, and touches of gilding at banquets supplied both the medieval love of ostentatious show and Galenic dietary lore: at the sumptuous banquet that Cardinal Riario offered to Eleanor of Naples in June 1473, the bread was gilded. Among the spices that have now fallen into obscurity are grains of paradise, a relative of cardamom which almost entirely replaced pepper in late medieval north French cooking, long pepper, mace, spikenard, galangal, and cubeb. Sugar, unlike today, was considered to be a type of spice due to its high cost and humoral qualities. Few dishes employed just one type of spice or herb, but rather a combination of several different ones. Even when a dish was dominated by a single flavor it was usually combined with another to produce a compound taste, for example parsley and cloves or pepper and ginger.

Common herbs such as sage, mustard, and parsley were grown and used in cooking all over Europe, as were caraway, mint, dill, and fennel. Many of these plants grew throughout all of Europe or were cultivated in gardens, and were a cheaper alternative to exotic spices. Mustard was particularly popular with meat dishes and was described by Hildegard of Bingen (1098–1179) as poor man's food. While locally grown herbs were less prestigious than spices, they were still used in upper-class food, but were then usually less prominent or included merely as coloring. Anise was used to flavor fish and chicken dishes, and its seeds were served as sugar-coated comfits.

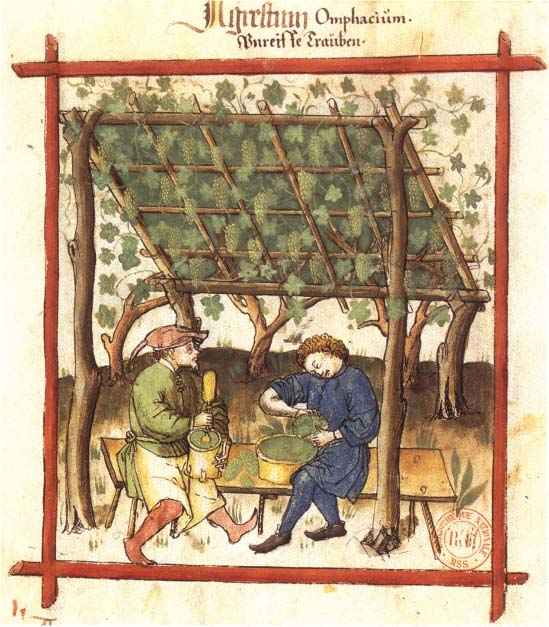
Picking green grapes for making verjuice; Tacuinum Sanitatis, 1474

Extant medieval recipes frequently call for flavoring with a number of sour, tart liquids. Wine, verjuice (the juice of unripe grapes or fruits), vinegar, and the juices of various fruits, especially those with tart flavors, were almost universal and a hallmark of late medieval cooking. In combination with sweeteners and spices, it produced a distinctive "pungeant, fruity" flavor. Equally common, and used to complement the tanginess of these ingredients, were (sweet) almonds. They were used in a variety of ways: whole, shelled or unshelled, slivered, ground, and, most importantly, processed into almond milk. This last type of non-dairy milk product is probably the single most common ingredient in late medieval cooking and blended the aroma of spices and sour liquids with a mild taste and creamy texture.

Salt was ubiquitous and indispensable in medieval cooking. Salting and drying was the most common form of food preservation and meant that fish and meat in particular were often heavily salted. Many medieval recipes specifically warn against oversalting and there were recommendations for soaking certain products in water to get rid of excess salt. Salt was present during more elaborate or expensive meals. The richer the host, and the more prestigious the guest, the more elaborate would be the container in which it was served and the higher the quality and price of the salt. Wealthy guests were seated "above the salt", while others sat "below the salt", where salt cellars were made of pewter, precious metals or other fine materials, often intricately decorated. The rank of a diner also decided how finely ground and white the salt was. Salt for cooking, preservation or for use by common people was coarser; sea salt, or "bay salt", in particular, had more impurities, and was described in colors ranging from black to green. Expensive salt, on the other hand, looked like the standard commercial salt common today.

== Sweets and desserts ==
The term "dessert" comes from the Old French desservir, 'to clear a table', literally 'to un-serve', and originated during the Middle Ages. It would typically consist of dragées and mulled wine accompanied by aged cheese, and by the Late Middle Ages could also include fresh fruit covered in honey, sugar, or syrup and boiled-down fruit pastes. Sugar, from its first appearance in Europe, was viewed as much as a drug as a sweetener; its long-lived medieval reputation as an exotic luxury encouraged its appearance in elite contexts accompanying meats and other dishes that to modern taste are more naturally savoury. There were a wide variety of fritters, crêpes with sugar, sweet custards and darioles, almond milk and eggs in a pastry shell that could also include fruit and sometimes even bone marrow or fish. German-speaking areas had a particular fondness for krapfen: fried pastries and dough with various sweet and savory fillings. Marzipan in many forms was well-known in Italy and southern France by the 1340s, and is assumed to be of Arab origin. Anglo-Norman cookbooks are full of recipes for sweet and savory custards, potages, sauces, and tarts with strawberries, cherries, apples, and plums. The English chefs also had a penchant for using flower petals such as roses, violets, and elder flowers. An early form of quiche can be found in Forme of Cury, a 14th-century recipe collection, as a Torte de Bry with a cheese and egg yolk filling.

Le Ménagier de Paris ("Parisian Household Book"), written in 1393, includes a quiche recipe made with three kinds of cheese, eggs, beet greens, spinach, fennel fronds, and parsley. In Northern France, a wide assortment of waffles and wafers was eaten with cheese and hypocras or a sweet malmsey as issue de table ('departure from the table'). The ever-present candied ginger, coriander, aniseed and other spices were referred to as épices de chambre ('parlor spices') and were taken as digestibles at the end of a meal to "close" the stomach. Like their Muslim counterparts in Spain, the Arab conquerors of Sicily introduced a wide variety of new sweets and desserts that eventually found their way to the rest of Europe. Just like Montpellier, Sicily was once famous for its comfits, nougat candy (torrone, or turrón in Spanish) and almond clusters (confetti). From the south, the Arabs also brought the art of ice cream-making that produced sorbet and several examples of sweet cakes and pastries; cassata alla Siciliana (from Arabic qas'ah, the term for the terracotta bowl with which it was shaped), made from marzipan, sponge cake with sweetened ricotta, and cannoli alla Siciliana, originally cappelli di turchi ('Turkish hats'), fried, chilled pastry tubes with a sweet cheese filling.

== Historiography and sources ==
Research into medieval foodways was, until around 1980, a somewhat neglected field of study. Misconceptions and outright errors were quite common among historians, and are still present in the popular view of the Middle Ages as a backward, primitive and barbaric era. Medieval cookery was described as revolting due to the often unfamiliar combination of flavors, the perceived lack of vegetables and a liberal use of spices. The heavy use of spices has been popular as an argument to support the claim that spices were employed to disguise the flavor of spoiled meat, a conclusion without support in historical fact and contemporary sources. Fresh meat could be procured throughout the year by those who could afford it. The preservation techniques available at the time, although crude by today's standards, were perfectly adequate. The astronomical cost and high prestige of spices, and thereby the reputation of the host, would have been effectively undone if wasted on cheap and poorly handled foods.

The common method of grinding and mashing ingredients into pastes and the many potages and sauces has been used as an argument that most adults within the medieval nobility lost their teeth at an early age, and hence were forced to eat nothing but porridge, soup and ground-up meat. This has been demonstrated by historians such as Terence Scully to be an unfounded theory.

The numerous descriptions of banquets from the later Middle Ages concentrated on the pageantry of the event rather than the minutiae of the food, which was not the same for most banqueters as those choice mets served at the high table. Banquet dishes were apart from the mainstream of cuisine, and have been described as "the outcome of grand banquets serving political ambition rather than gastronomy; today as yesterday" by historian Maguelonne Toussant-Samat.

=== Cookbooks ===
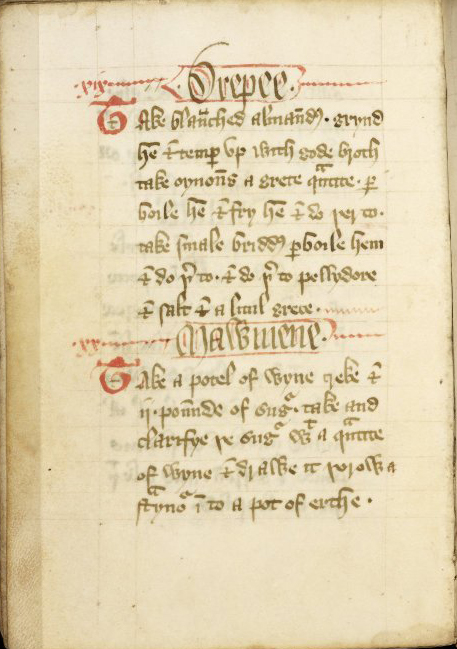
A page from a late-14th-century manuscript of Forme of Cury with recipes for "drepee", parboiled birds with almonds and fried onions, and the first part of a recipe for "mawmenee", a sweet stew of capon or pheasant with cinnamon, ginger, cloves, dates and pine nuts and colored with sandalwood

Cookbooks, or more specifically, recipe collections, compiled in the Middle Ages are among the most important historical sources for medieval cuisine. The first cookbooks began to appear toward the end of the 13th century. The Liber de Coquina, perhaps originating near Naples, and the Tractatus de modo preparandi have found a modern editor in Marianne Mulon, and a cookbook from Assisi found at Châlons-sur-Marne has been edited by Maguelonne Toussaint-Samat. Though it is assumed that they describe real dishes, food scholars do not believe they were used as cookbooks might be today, as a step-by-step guide through the cooking procedure that could be kept at hand while preparing a dish. Few in a kitchen, at those times, would have been able to read, and working texts have a low survival rate.

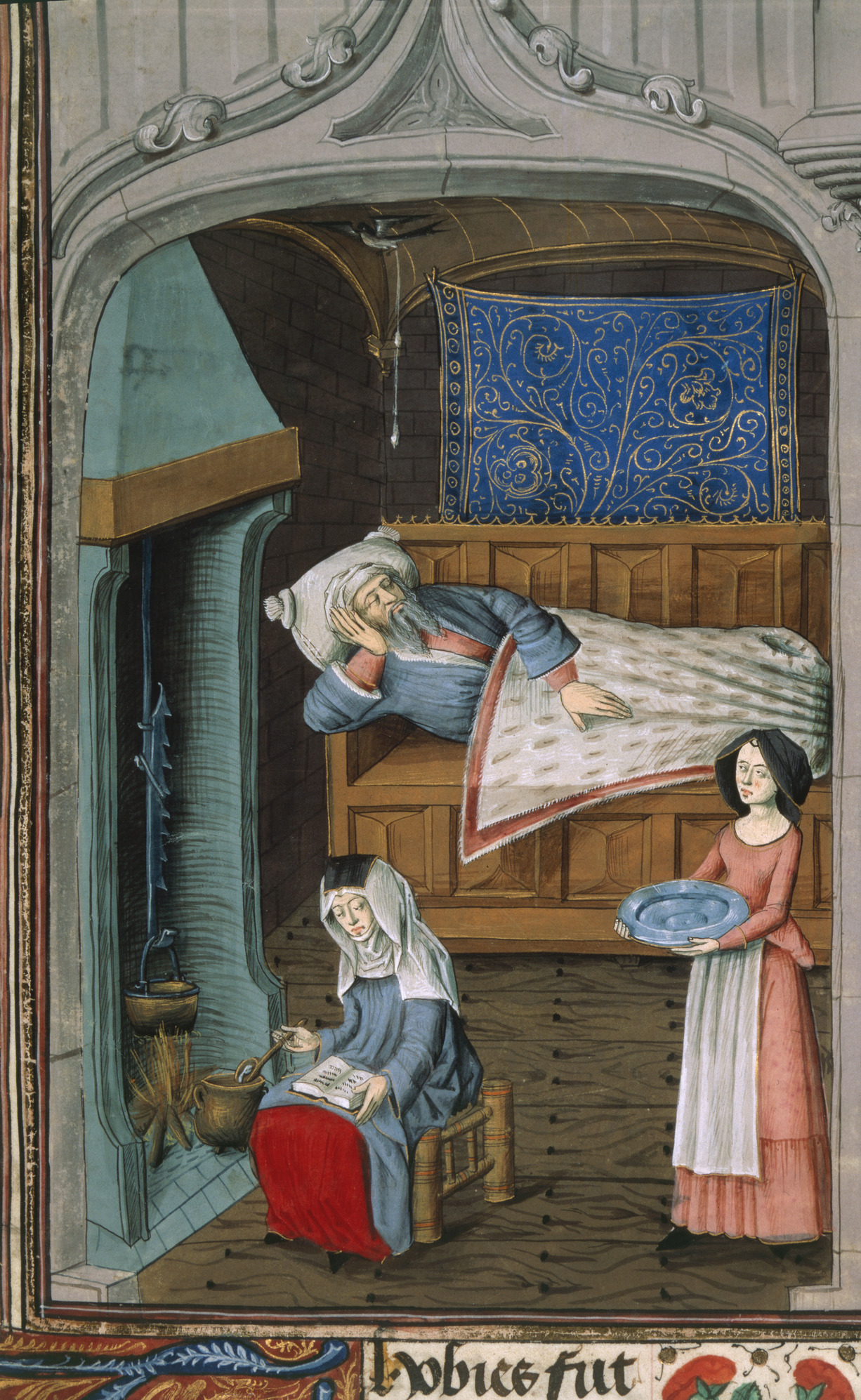
A late-fifteenth-century illustration commissioned by King Edward IV of England, representative of the Book of Tobit, in which Tobit's wife Anna prepares food with the help of a cookbook

The recipes were often brief and did not give precise quantities. Cooking times and temperatures were seldom specified since accurate portable clocks were not available and since all cooking was done with fire. At best, cooking times could be specified as the time it took to say a certain number of prayers or how long it took to walk around a certain field. Professional cooks were taught their trade through apprenticeship and practical training, working their way up in the highly defined kitchen hierarchy. A medieval cook employed in a large household would most likely have been able to plan and produce a meal without the help of recipes or written instruction. Due to the generally good condition of surviving manuscripts it has been proposed by food historian Terence Scully that they were records of household practices intended for the wealthy and literate master of a household, such as Le Ménagier de Paris from the late 14th century. Over 70 collections of medieval recipes survive today, written in several major European languages.

The repertory of housekeeping instructions laid down by manuscripts like the Ménagier de Paris also include many details of overseeing correct preparations in the kitchen. Toward the onset of the early modern period, in 1474, the Vatican librarian Bartolomeo Platina wrote De honesta voluptate et valetudine ("On honorable pleasure and health"). In 1563, the physician Iodocus Willich edited Apicius, in Zürich.

High-status exotic spices and rarities like ginger, pepper, cloves, sesame, citron leaves and "onions of Escalon" all appear in an eighth-century list of spices that the Carolingian cook should have at hand. It was written by Vinidarius, whose excerpts of Apicius survive in an eighth-century uncial manuscript. Vinidarius's own dates may not be much earlier.

== See also ==
- Early modern European cuisine
- Guillaume Tirel
- Guild feasts in medieval England
- List of post-classical dishes
- Tudor food and drink
- Medieval household
- Pre-Columbian cuisine
