= Pre-Columbian cuisine =

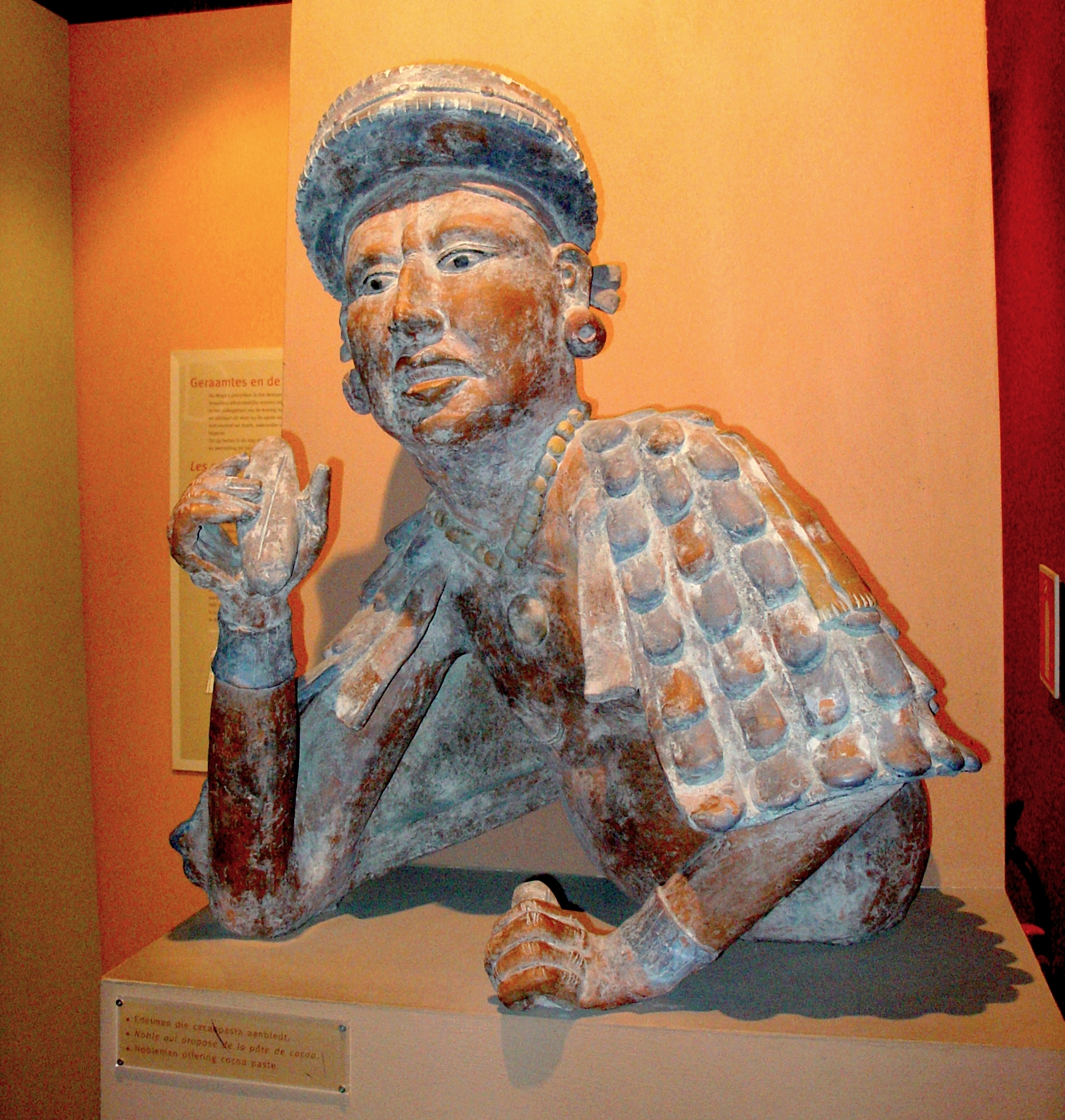
The Maya created one of the most successful Pre-Columbian civilisations. This sculpture depicts a Maya nobleman holding cacao, which was essential in the Maya diet as a component of chocolate drinks.

Pre-Columbian cuisine refers to the cuisine consumed by the Indigenous peoples of the Americas before Christopher Columbus and other European explorers explored the region and introduced crops and livestock from Europe. Though the Columbian Exchange introduced many new animals and plants to the Americas, Indigenous civilizations already existed there, including the Aztec, Maya, Incan, as well as various Native Americans in North America. The development of agriculture allowed the many different cultures to transition from hunting to staying in one place. A major element of this cuisine is maize (corn), which began being grown in central Mexico. Other crops that flourished in the Americas include amaranth, wild rice, and lima beans.

== Cuisine by culture ==
=== Maya ===
Maize (commonly called corn in the United States) dough made up a majority of Maya cuisine, used for tortillas and tamales. The technique that Maya used was to use a stone slab and a rolling pin-like object to grind up ingredients. The ground maize created by this process was used in the tortillas. Popular drinks included chocolate drinks, made from ground cacao in water, and atoles and pinoles, which were made from ground up seeds. The Maya were likely the first group of people to depict cacao in writing. A popular tradition was to prepare unique tamales in commemoration of special events. In addition, corn was a symbol of life and health. Each family took one ear of corn and did not plant it or eat it. Rather, they blessed it at the beginning of the harvest.

=== Inca cuisine ===
The Incan Empire was based in modern-day Peru and dominated much of northern South America. Both the potato and the sweet potato originally hail from the Incan region. Maize was also cultivated in the region since 3000 BCE. A major component of the Incan diet that has recently become popular again is quinoa, another native plant. A traditional meat comes from the Peruvian guinea pig, considered a delicacy. The Incan people drank chicha de jora, a traditional drink.

People used clay pots known as ollas de barro for the flavor they add to cooked food. Families gathered to celebrate ranch anniversaries through outdoor cooking pits known as pachamanca. These large feasts include meat, tubers, and corn.

=== Native American cuisine ===
Foodways typically included the hunting of wild animals, gathering of wild plants, and cultivating of fruits and vegetables. The Southwestern region of the United States, now made up of Arizona, Colorado, New Mexico, Utah, and parts of Texas, was initially settled by different groups of Native Americans. The Puebloan people turned to agriculture, holding small farms along the Rio Grande in New Mexico, with a diet consisting of corn, beans, and squash. Conversely, other groups retained their hunter-gatherer roots, including the Navajo, Apache, and Utes.

Among all tribes, maize is the most important food, while beans and squash are also held in high regard. These three crops, known as the "Three Sister Crops", were typically planted together, supporting each other as they grow. Chokecherries were also an important crop, mostly for the Blackfoot and Cheyenne tribes. Many tribes used their knowledge of the natural world to hunt for meat both on land and in the sea. Fish, shellfish, and small grassland game animals were staples for hunter-gatherer tribes in the Pacific Northwest and Alaska such as the Salish and the Tlingit, respectively. Plains tribes extensively hunted bison, using them for meat, clothing, and weapons. All parts of the animal were consumed in one way or another.

Another universal custom among all tribes was the role of women in food consumption. They were always given the jobs of preparation and gathering. Many types of tools were used to prepare food. Made from bones of hunted game, these tools included stirring sticks, ladles, and kettles. Kettles were the primary method of cooking, but other vessels were used, such as clay bowls and baskets. Natives had to develop preservation techniques to avoid the possibility of starvation during the winter. They did this through drying, smoking, and salting.

== Important crops ==
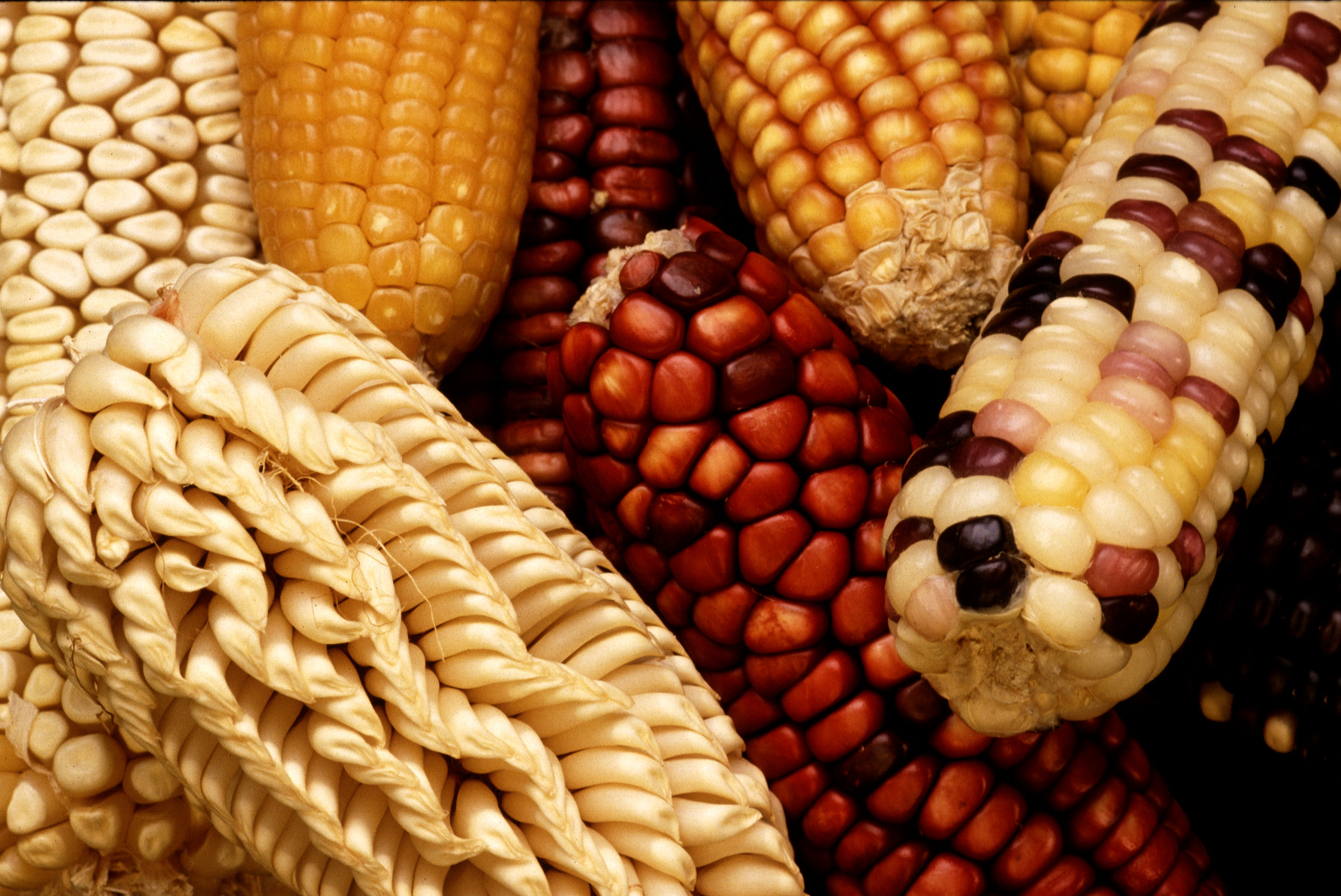
Maize, variously colored small ears, was the quintessential crop for much of the Americas both before and after the Columbian Exchange.

=== Maize ===
This crop was initially farmed by members of the Aztec, Mayan, and Incan cultures. It is an extremely important staple, and is considered to be the most important throughout the native peoples of the New World. Its cultivation allowed people to stop hunting and begin to settle down. Its contribution to the rise of civilization is made clear in its godlike status among native people, frequently being used a subject of art and pottery. Maize was the focal point of many Pre-Columbian religions, playing an analogous role to bread in Western religion, or rice in Eastern cultures. Humans themselves are both physically and spiritually melded from corn. Research has shown that maize may have even been a staple food in the Pre-Columbian Caribbean. Evidence of its cultivation has been found around the region, suggesting its status as an important foodstuff.

=== Phaseolus bean ===
This bean was very important due to its compatibility with another essential crop, maize. It acted a companion for maize in farming, nutrition, and cooking. While the bean could contribute nitrogen to the soil, maize could prop up the bean and help it to grow. In addition, the combination of beans and maize was rich in protein, and could be easily combined to become a reliable source of it.

=== Capsicum peppers ===
These peppers were also prominently featured in pottery, and served many medicinal uses.

=== Starches ===
The significance of cassava, potato, and sweet potato is made clear by their prominence in sculpture and art. Both potatoes and sweet potatoes were initially cultivated by the Incas.

=== Blueberry ===
This fruit was used in conjunction with dried meat in a dish known as pemmican, common among indigenous tribes.

=== Brambles ===
Species of Rubus were not necessarily cultivated by indigenous people, but all modern cultivars originate from species native to North America.

=== Cacao ===
The seeds of this plant held monetary value to the Aztecs, and were also common in ceramics. The chocolate that comes from it gave rise to a variety of beverages. Due to the specificity of the environments in which they can succeed, cacao bean cultivation was highly regionalized, grown in plantation-like monocultures.

=== Cactus ===
Also hailing from the New World, cactus crops are now frequently used for fruit, vegetables, and dye.

=== Chokecherries ===
Important for Plains tribes of Native Americans, these cherries were pounded and sun-dried.

=== Manoomin ===
This wild rice, native to the Great Lakes region of America, was extremely important for the Anishinaabe people.

== History ==
=== 15,000–13,000 BCE ===
Big-game hunters migrated through the Bering Plain from Siberia then dispersed throughout the Americas and resulted in a variety of different cultures.

=== 13,000–10,000 BCE ===
Large mammals start to become extinct, possibly due to human overhunting.

=== 9500–2000 BCE ===
People hunt for smaller animals, including fish. People also begin to forage for plants. The foraging of plants and hunting of small animals leads to the formation of settlements along the coast of the Pacific Ocean. Agriculture in South America may have begun in coastal Ecuador with the domestication of squash about 8000 BCE by the Las Vegas culture.

=== 3000–1200 BCE ===
Agriculture begins with the creating of flour and the cultivation of maize. This allows for a more settled lifestyle and spirituality begins to formulate. The earliest archaeologically verified potato tuber remains have been found at the coastal site of Ancon (central Peru), dating to 2500 BCE. Potatoes became one of the most important source of food in Pre-Columbian Andean civilizations.

=== Slightly before 1000 BCE ===
Seafood essentially disappears from the diets of Peruvians. Domestic turkeys were likely first domesticated in Mesoamerica in the first millennium BCE, using its meat and eggs as major sources of protein.

=== 1000 BCE–1000 CE ===
Cultures of people living in forests live in urban settlements, flourishing thanks to the cultivation of vegetables such as squash. This includes the Adena people, who furthered spirituality by linking works of art to the natural world.

=== After 900 BCE ===
Most Mesoamerican societies begin to rely on maize as their primary source of food.

=== After 800 BCE ===
Phaseolus becomes known to the people of Peru.

=== 1100 CE ===
The Hopi people have an agriculture largely based on maize, with beliefs grounded in the power of nature and the "corn mother," who sustains them and gives them life.

=== 1519 CE ===
Hernan Cortes found the Aztec Empire in the heart of present-day Mexico, amazed at their comprehensive knowledge about health, illness, and treatment.

== Effect on modern society ==
Various crops found in the New World are of monumental importance in today's society, especially maize. Its value exceeds the monetary gain that the conquistadores had due to silver and gold, and is the most important world grain. Its production worldwide is over 800 million tons, and is the primary ingredient in animal feed, human food, artificial sweeteners, and even gasoline. For example, maize is still the basis of much of Mexican cuisine. Countless other New World crops were spread among other countries thanks to Christopher Columbus. The peanut became widely used in Africa. Capsicum peppers are a significant part of Asian cuisine. Tomatoes are essential to Italian cuisine and are very common worldwide. The potato is among the most important vegetables. Fruits including pineapple, papaya, and strawberry were widely spread to other countries as well.

Industrial crops, especially cotton, rubber, quinine, and tobacco, have become widely grown for non-food purposes. Cotton is common in clothing, rubber has many industrial uses, quinine contributed to the destruction of malaria, and tobacco contributed to many negative health effects.

=== Mexican cuisine ===
Just like the cultures that inhabited Mexico before the Columbian exchange, the modern Mexican diet is heavily based on corn, beans, and peppers. Corn possesses the same importance in the region today that it did in the past. It remains the essential food product in Mexico and is utilized in a variety of ways. Also, beans are consumed in conjunction with corn like in the past. Other native plants that remain prevalent in Mexico's cuisine include: tomatoes, squash, onions, tomatillos, chayote, avocados, and cactus.

== See also ==
- Medieval cuisine, the cuisines of Europe throughout the Middle Ages
- Bush tucker, ancient cuisines of Aboriginal Australians
