= Meat carving =

Cutting meat into individual servings

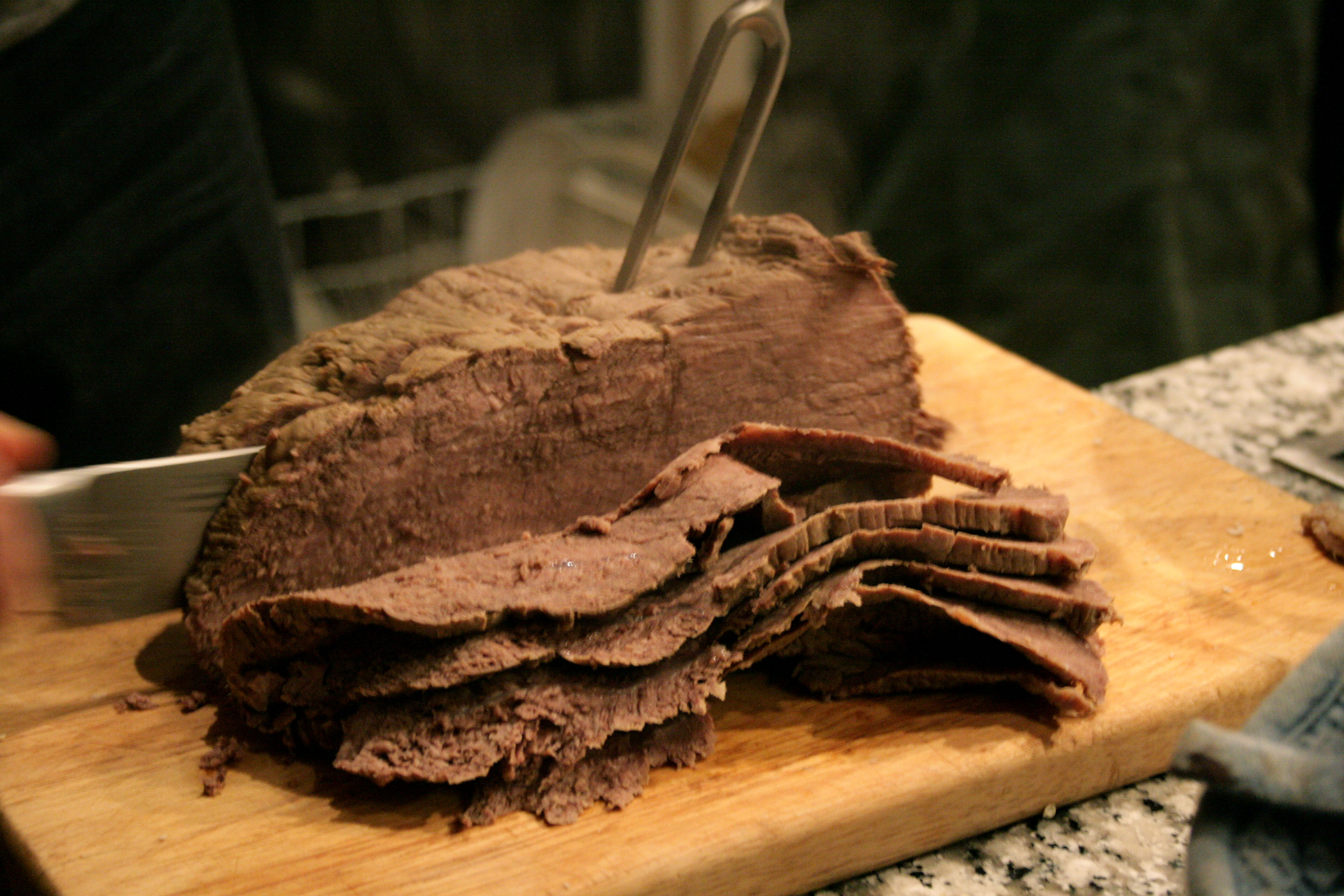
Tafelspitz, a popular Austrian dish, being carved.

Meat carving is the process and skill of cutting portions of meat, such as roast and poultry, to obtain a maximum or satisfactory number of meat portions, using a carving knife or meat-slicing machine. A meat carver disjoints the meat and slices in uniform portions. Meat carving is sometimes considered a skill for the private dinner table.

== See also ==
- Butcher
- Cut of beef
- Cleaver (knife)
- Ground meat
- Meatpacking
