= Verrucole Castle =

Medieval fortress in Tuscany, Italy

Coordinates: 44.1795°N 10.3332°E

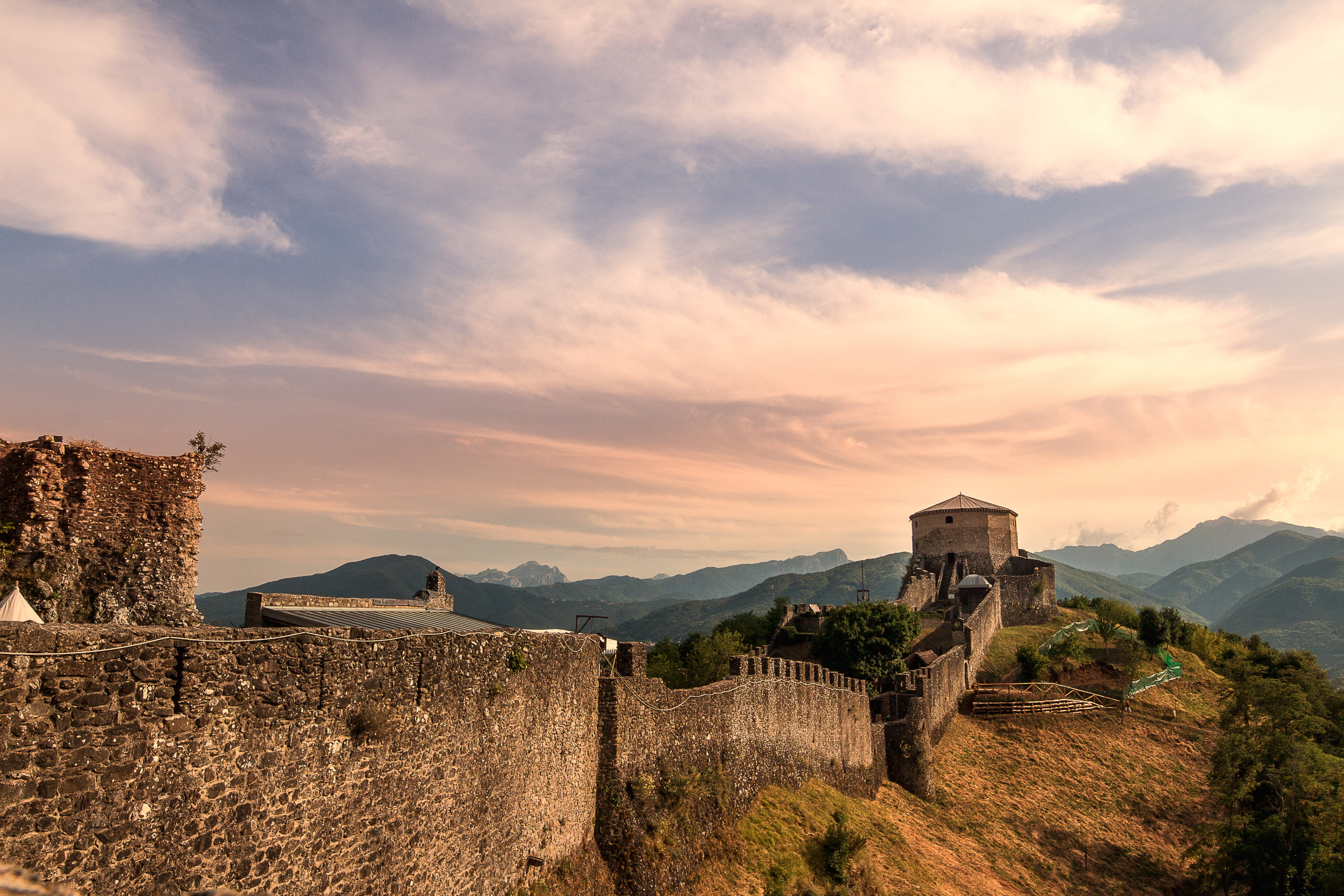
Verrucole Castle

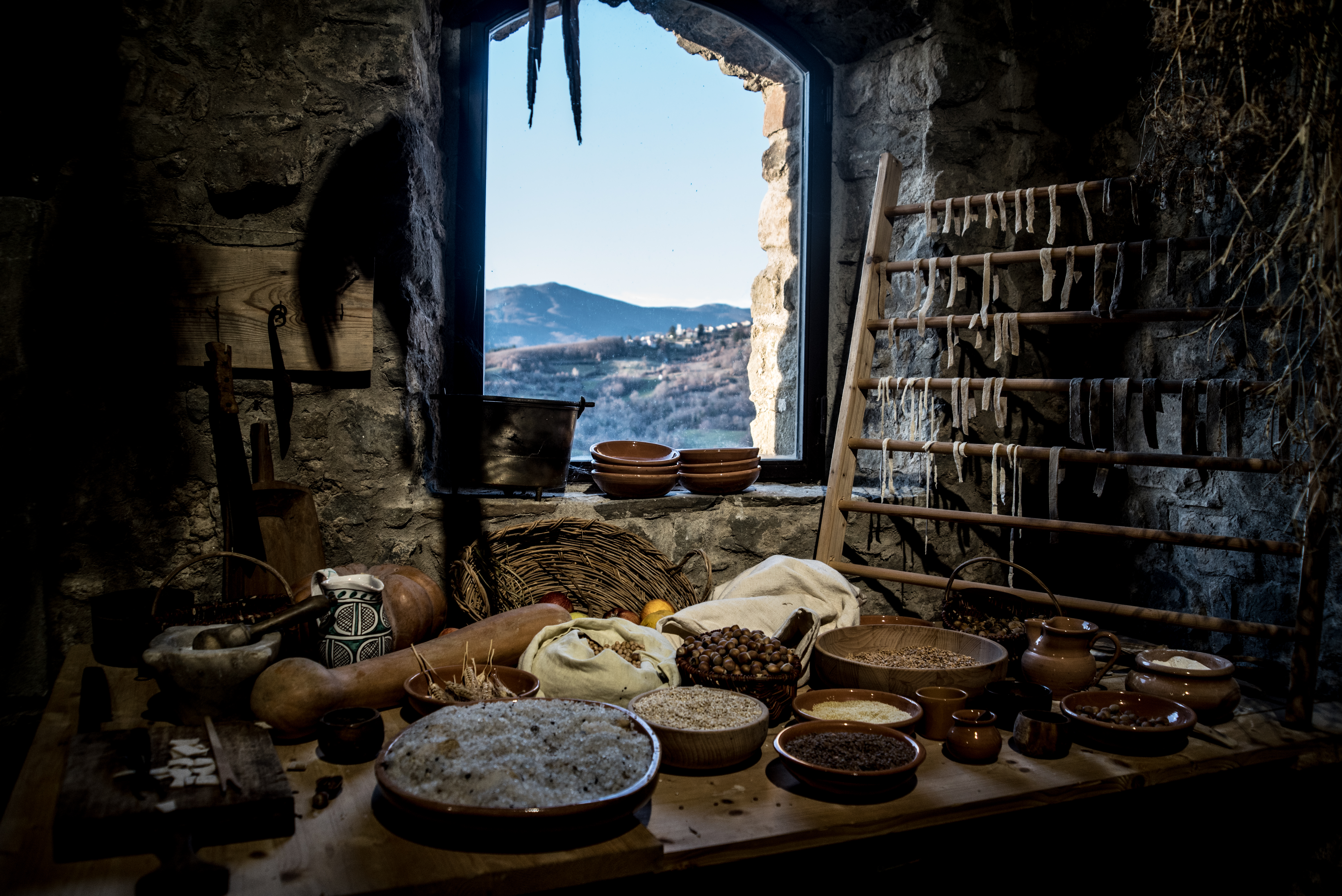
Medieval kitchen

Verrucole Castle (Italian: Fortezza delle Verrucole) is a medieval fortress located in the Garfagnana region of Tuscany, Italy, in San Romano in Garfagnana comune, near the city of Lucca. It is 600 metres (2,000 ft) above sea level.

The fortress has recently undergone partial restoration. The territory of the fortress has been restored to give an understanding of the medieval way of life. The keep has undergone more considerable reconstruction with exhibits on different aspects of medieval life, including food, medicine, and warfare.
