= Guild feasts in medieval England =

Guild feasts were part of the food culture of medieval England.

== Background ==
The culture of eating and drinking together was an important aspect of social and community life during the Middle Ages. There was little to distinguish ecclesiastical feasts from secular ones in the 15th century. By the late medieval period, craftspeople and merchants had opportunity to eat luxurious foods from time to time at guild feasts; and (more humble) fare would be distributed to the poor. Venison was given as a gift by the nobility and could not be bought at markets or butchers' shops, which Felicity Heal has said helped "develop and reinforce patronage networks".

Guilds gathered for the obiit vigils of their members, endowed ceremonies where intercessory prayers were read for deceased Christians. On these days, alms and food were distributed to the poor in urban areas. Bread, cheese and ale were given out in the guild chapel at an obiit held in 1442 for the parker of Fulbrook (meaning park-keeper in Middle English) at the guild of the Holy Cross at Stratford-upon-Avon. In 1533 cakes, comfits, wine, ale and cheese were distributed at The Trinity Guild of Coventry for the obiit of their alderman Nicholas Burwey.

== Feasts ==
Guild feasts, often associated with a guild's saint's day, were a central element of a guild's activities. The feasts were usually paid for by guild members themselves. The guild of St James Garlickhithe held a feast for its members; each guild member was expected to pay 20 pence (1s. 8d.), around four to five days' wages for a skilled worker in the late 14th century. In the early 15th century guild members at the guild of the Holy Cross at Statford paid around sixpence. Attendance for guild members was required and those who missed the feast without a good reason would normally be fined, but this may not have been enforced in practice.

The number of feasts held each year varied by guild, and the main feast for the guild's saint's day might be only one of a number of feasts the guild held each year. At the fraternity of St John the Baptist in Winchester the main feast was held on 24 June (the feast of the nativity of St John the Baptist), and a lesser feast for Corpus Christi. The feasts could take place at lunch, supper or breakfast. At these feasts, guild members would come together for religious and other social celebrations.

Provisions were made for a feast in the ordinances for the guild of St George in Norwich. The guild brothers would go to Mass and then to a place determined by the alderman and guild masters and pay 10 pence for the cost of wax for the altar lights, food and minstrels. The feasting might continue into the evening for a smaller group of members with foods like rabbit and woodcock that are not recorded among provisions for the main feast.

== Provisions ==
The Stratford feast in the 15th century took place on a meat day, but based on expenditures it appears that some persons chose to eat fish. Wheat was purchased, sometimes in amounts over five quarters (perhaps 60 kg), to bake (sometimes very large) loaves of bread, though by the second half of the 15th century the bread was baked by local bakers instead of at the guild's bakehouse. Milled flour was purchased for bakemeats, pies, tarts and other pastries. Brewed ale was purchased along with malt which was used to brew even more ale. 165 geese and 163 pullets were purchased, most from peasant farmers, as raising poultry was not a common feature of manor houses.

In 1560 at an annual feast for the Master of the Worshipful Company of Skinners where "all was welcome" to partake of the "grett plenty", there was marmalade, comfits, and fruit - Portuguese oranges, cherries, strawberries and "pippins". London's Lord Mayor William Harpur attended the Master Grocers' feast in 1561, where three stags and eight bucks, a luxury usually available only to the noble classes, were served for the exclusive pre-banquet lunch.
