= Guillaume Tirel =

French cook and food writer (c.1310–1395)

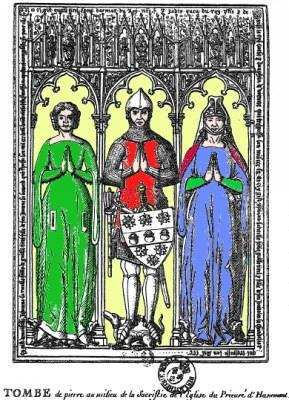
Engraving based on the tomb of Guillaume Tirel (see original below) flanked by his two wives, and showing three casserole pots on his shield. Image extracted from the edition of Le Viandier by Baron Jérôme Pichon et Georges Vicaire

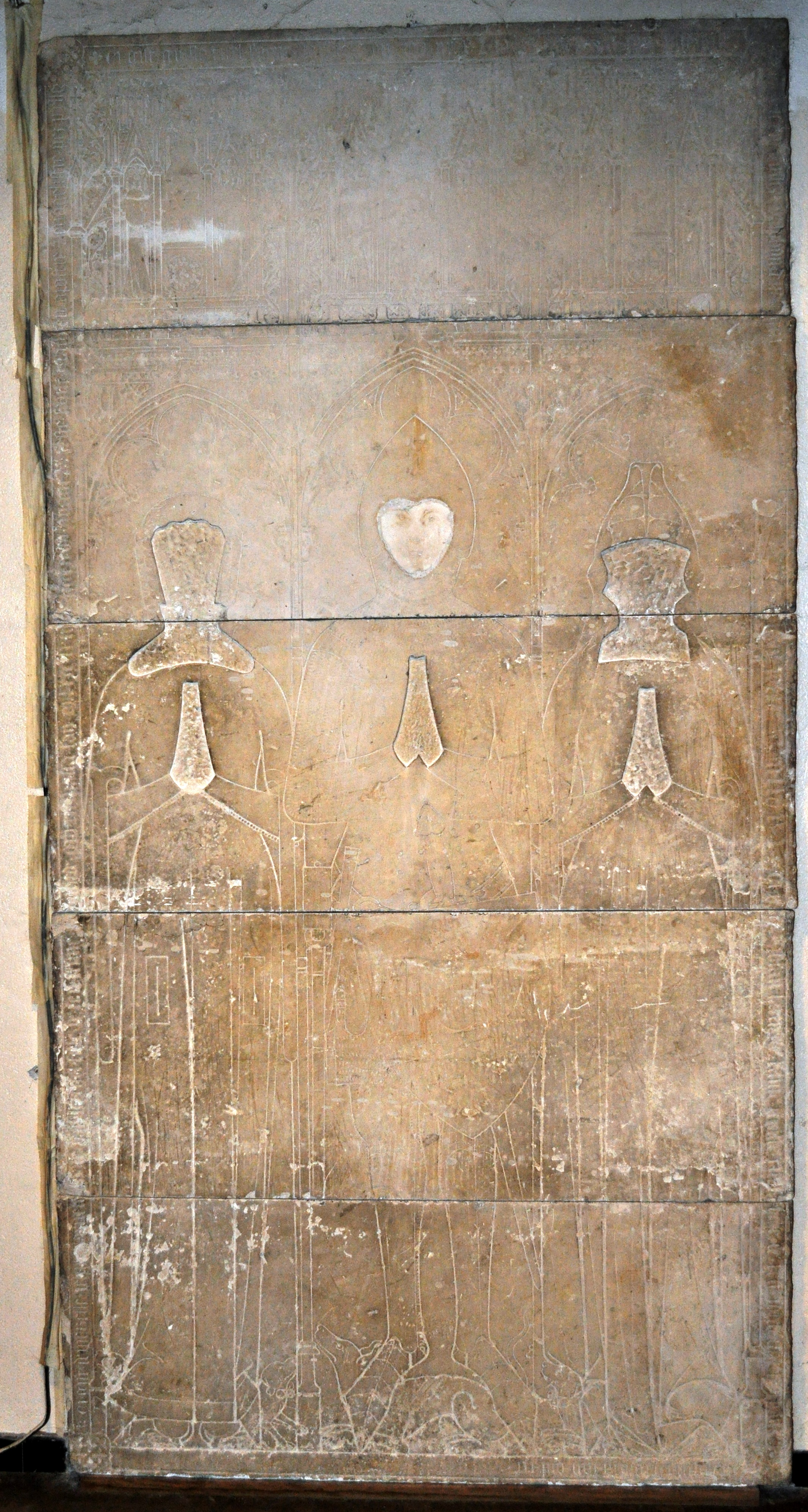
Guillaume Tirel's tombstone at the fr:Église Saint-Léger de Saint-Germain-en-Laye

Guillaume Tirel (French pronunciation: [ɡijom tiʁɛl]), known as Taillevent ([tajvɑ̃] (ca. 1310 – 1395) was an important figure in the early history of French cuisine. He was cook to the Court of France at the time of the first Valois kings and the Hundred Years' War. He was the author of one of the earliest known French cookery books and the first to be printed.

== Life and career ==
The food historian Anne Willan has remarked that Taillevent "must have been quite a character" because "a remarkable amount is known about him in an age when most craftsmen, like the builders of the Gothic cathedrals, passed forgotten into history". Nevertheless, the dates of events in his early years are uncertain. His birthplace is believed to have been Pont-Audemer in Normandy, but his year of birth is not precisely known and writers have proposed dates from 1310 to 1326 – the former or something approximating is now thought more likely. It is also unknown when he acquired the sobriquet of "Taillevent" (literally "Wind-cutter"); Willan comments that many apprentices in those days picked up nicknames that they never outgrew. Nor is the significance of the nickname clear: according to a seventeenth-century writer it signifies an idle swaggerer; a 2020 article suggests that the word meant a light sail on a small boat and was a reference to his large, pronounced, aquiline nose.

Taillevent's first position was happelapin or enfant de cuisine (kitchen boy) to Queen Jeanne d'Évreux of France in 1326, with the task of turning the large roasting spits before the open fire. By 1346 he had risen to be a keu (cook) to the French King Philip VI, and in 1349 he was granted a house in consideration of the good and pleasant service the king had received. He was raised to the rank of écuyer or squire as Ecuyer de l’Ostel de Mons, and his master was the Dauphin de Viennois – the heir to the French throne. Taillevent served several members of the royal family: In 1359 he was in the service of the Duke of Normandy; in 1368 the latter became Charles V and Taillevent continued in his service, becoming premier keu or chief cook in 1373. In 1381 he became écuyer de cuisine to Charles VI and from 1388 to 1392 he was premier écuyer of the royal kitchens, heading the half-dozen kitchens of the queen and the various royal dukes as well as those of the king.

He expanded a collection of recipes as Le Viandier, a famous book on cookery and cookery technique, probably written with the encouragement of Charles V, who was known as Charles the Wise because of his fine judgment and cultivated tastes. The book is one of the first professional culinary treatises written in France, and the first to be printed; the French gastronomic tradition was founded on it. In the view of the cookery writer Terence Scully, the Viandier embodies late medieval French cookery: its influence can be seen in most of the printed cookery books of the late fifteenth and sixteenth centuries.

Willan comments that in Taillevent's time, cooks had to prepare food for tables on which there were few implements. Forks were unknown, spoons rare, and knives frowned upon. A "gobbet" the size of a finger was the largest permissible morsel, and meats were "hew'd", "smitten", or "grounde to douste" in almost every recipe. Taillevent had a wide range of ingredients at his disposal. In Le Viandier he mentions more than two dozen meats and birds, including stork, heron and peacock. Meat of any kind was reserved for the rich, and even they were restricted to a diet of fish for more than half the days in the year by the strict fasting laws imposed by the church. Taillevent lists more than fifty different kinds of sea- and freshwater-fish. He seasoned many of his dishes with – expensive – saffron and nutmeg and savoury dishes were often seasoned with sugar as well as vinegar or verjus made from the juice of any tart fruit.

Taillevent died in 1395 at around 80 years of age. He was buried at the fr:Église Saint-Léger de Saint-Germain-en-Laye in a chapel that he had founded for the purpose. With him were buried his wives, Jeanne Bonard, who died in 1363, and Isabeau Le Chandelier, who outlived him: the date of her death is unknown as Taillevent's heirs neglected to have it inscribed on the tombstone. The grave was vandalised during the French Revolution, when the church and its dependencies were sold as national property. The remains of the tombstone were preserved in the museum of the city of Saint-Germain-en-Laye. and subsequently restored at the church.

Taillevant is still a major name in cooking. The two-Michelin-star Taillevent restaurant was founded in 1946 and moved to the former town house of the Duc de Morny in 1950 in the 8th arrondissement of Paris between the Boulevard Haussmann and the Champs-Elysées. The Michelin Guide (2026) calls it a "legendary establishment ... the epitome of French classicism". It has two subsidiary outposts, one in Paris (described by Michelin as an "ultra-chic brasserie") and one in London, both called Les 110 de Taillevent. Additionally, there is a hospitality school – the Lycée Hôtelier Guillaume Tirel – which has four training restaurants and focuses their practices on the foundations of Taillevent's work in Le Viandier.

== Sources ==
- Davidson, Alan (1999). The Oxford Companion to Food (first ed.). Oxford: Oxford University Press. ISBN 978-0-19-211579-9.
- Johnson, Hugh (1989). Vintage : A Television History of Wine. London: Channel Four. OCLC 37268750.
- Pichon, Baron Jérôme; Georges Vicaire, eds. (1967) [1892]. Le Viandier de Guillaume Tirel dit Taillevent (in French). Geneva: Slatkine. OCLC 906427040.
- Scully, Eleanor (1995). Early French Cookery: Sources, History, Original Recipes and Modern Adaptations. Ann Arbor: University of Michigan Press. ISBN 0-47-208877-7.
- Simon, André (1952). The Gourmet's Week-End Book. London: Seeley. OCLC 504357013.
- Willan, Anne (1995). Great Cooks and Their Recipes: from Taillevent to Escoffier. London: Pavilion. ISBN 1-85793-693-0.

== See also ==
- Medieval cuisine
