= Alfred Bonnardot =

French essayist, independent historian, and bibliophile

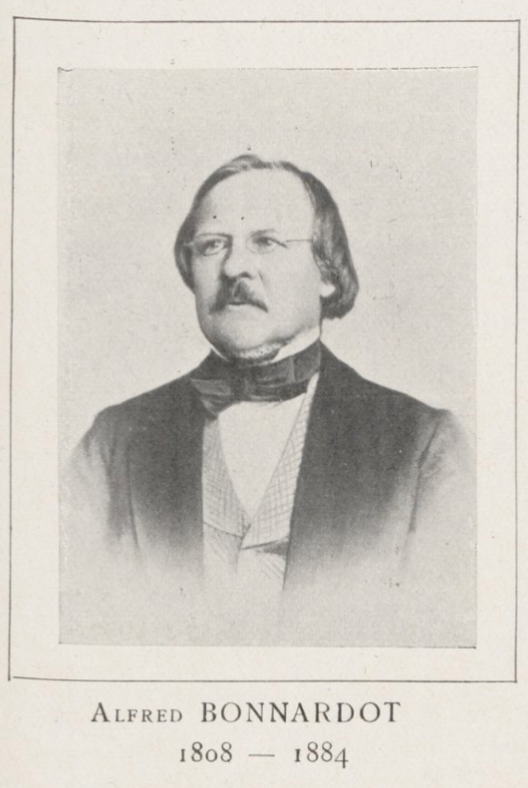
- Bonnardot in 1868 (from Perrot 1911)
- Born: 16 February 1808
- Died: 5 January 1884 (aged 75)
- Burial place: Paris: Père-Lachaise Cemetery- Division 28
- Occupations: Essayist; independent historian

Alfred Bonnardot (16 February 1808 – 5 January 1884) was a French essayist, independent historian, and bibliophile. His most notable work is a study on maps of Paris from the 16th-18th centuries, Études archéologiques sur les anciens plans de Paris des XVIe, XVIIe, et XVIIIe siecles (1851). He developed his antiquarian interests under the mentorship of Antoine Gilbert (1784–1858), grand sonneur of Notre-Dame de Paris and Jérôme Pichon (1812–1896), president of the Société des bibliophiles français. Bonnardot also wrote a comprehensive manual on the care and restoration of prints and old books, Essai sur l'art de restaurer les estampes et les livres (1846, 1858 2nd ed.). Bonnardot's name is included among those important to the history of Paris on the exterior wall of the Musee Carnavalet on the rue des Francs Bourgeois, and the museum has holdings from his personal collection, notably Le cimetière et l’église des Saints-Innocents (c. 1570) attributed to the Flemish painter Jacob Grimmer.

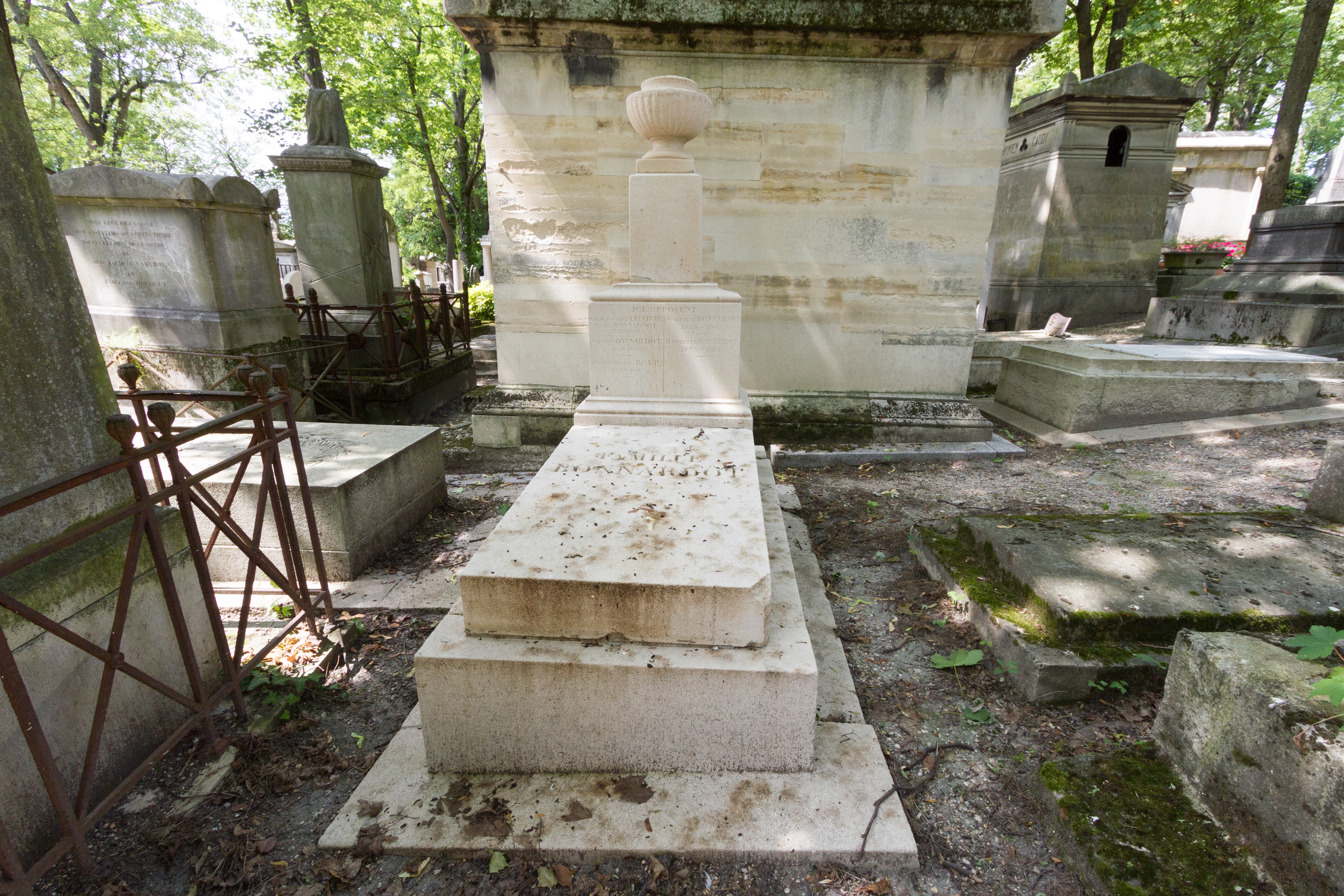
Tomb of Alfred Bonnardot
