= Georges Vicaire =

French bibliographer

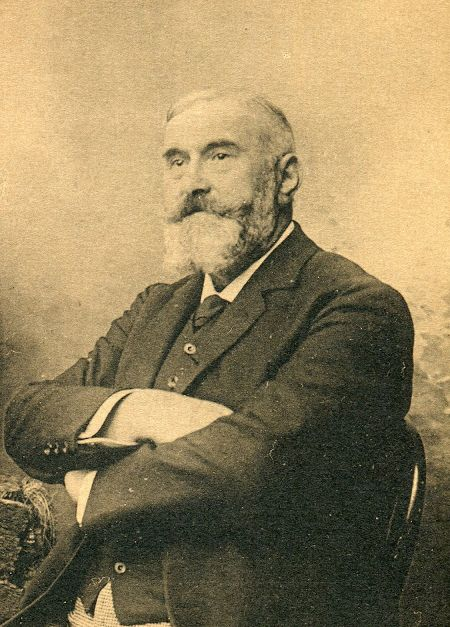
Georges Vicaire

Georges Vicaire (8 December 1853 – 4 November 1921) was a French bibliophile and bibliographer. The son of Henri Vicaire (1802-1865), General Director of forests, and Marthe Vicaire Blais, Georges Vicaire was the father of Jean Vicaire and Marcel Vicaire (1893–1976), an orientalist painter.

== Biography ==
Georges Vicaire was responsible for special work on the preparation of the printed catalogs of the Bibliothèque de l'Arsenal, then was attached to the Bibliothèque Mazarine. In 1909, the Institut de France appointed curator of the Bibliothèque Lovenjoul, created by Charles de Spoelberch de Lovenjoul and located in Chantilly, next to the Musée Condé, which houses the very large Library of Henri d'Orléans, Duke of Aumale. He was also correspondent to the Vatican Library. He had hence access to funds from both institutions.

Vicaire is the author of bibliographies of Honoré de Balzac, José-Maria de Heredia, George Sand, Stendhal, Victor Hugo and gastronomic literature and a very important work in 8 volumes on the literature of the nineteenth century, Le Manuel de l'amateur de livres du XIXe siècle. "This work, which will remain one of the monuments of the bibliography, has among other merits that of fending for the first time the issue long overlooked by first editions of the great romantic" and earned its author in 1906, the Botta prize of the Académie française and twice, in 1900 and 1912, the Brunet prize awarded by the Académie des inscriptions et belles-lettres.

From 1896 until his death, Georges Vicaire was director of the Bulletin du bibliophile with which he worked since 1890. From 1898 to 1902, he was secretary of the "Amis de l'eau forte" and in 1900, a member of the organizing committee of the retrospective section of book at the Exposition Universelle (1900) and a committee member of the International Congress of Libraries. On 27 February 1901, he was elected a member of the "Société des bibliophiles français", established in 1820. At seat XII, he succeeded Jean Hély d'Oissel, Félix-Sébastien Feuillet de Conches, Count Charpin-Feugerolles, Mme Standish-Noailles. In 1890, he had published to her attention, "Rôti-cochon" ("roast-pig") and was preparing for her an important and erudite study which was published in 1901 in the Almanach du bibliophile with which he collaborated since 1898.

In 1903, appeared Jeunesse de Balzac by Gabriel Hanotaux and Georges Vicaire. A new edition, augmented of the correspondence between Balzac and Madame de Berny, published shortly after the death of Georges Vicaire, of which Gabriel Hanotaux could write, in the afterword dated 8 November 1921: "He did not have the satisfaction to see this book published and, after twenty-five years of cordial collaboration, I have the pain of losing at the time of realization, this incomparable friend. This book comes from him, it is him. I send it back to his memory. It will include on each page, the marks of his conscience, his flawless erudition and worship he professed for beautiful literature".

Knowledgeable about food and culinary arts, his copious annotations have generated exceptional interest for both the culinary art and bibliophily. His work Bibliographie gastronomique "should be considered as the most important bibliographic contribution in this area" (André-Louis Simon). Katherine Bitting states "This work is considered the most erudite and valuable existing bibliography on culinary topics."

== Works ==
- 1882: Le Récit du grand-père. Souvenir d'Alsace
- 1890: Bibliographie gastronomique. La cuisine, la table, l'office, les aliments, les vins, les cuisiniers, les gourmands et les gastronomes, l'économie domestique, facéties, dissertations, singulières, pièces de théâtre, etc., preface by Paul Ginisty, Paris, Rouquette et fils, rare work which lists more than 2,500 books on the subject between the fifteenth century and the end of the nineteenth century Read online
- 1892: Bibliographie des publications faites par M. le Baron Jérôme Pichon, président de la Société des bibliophiles françois, de 1833 à 1892
- 1892: Sir Kenelm Digby et les anciens rapports des bibliothèques françaises avec la Grande-Bretagne
- 1893: Les ″Incunabula biblica″ de M. W. A. Copinger and the ″Bibliographical society″
- 1894: Documents pour servir à l'histoire des libraires de Paris, 1486–1600, in collaboration with Jérôme Pichon, Paris, Techener
- 1892:Le Viandier de Taillevent, in collaboration with Jérôme Pichon, 1892
- 1894–1920: Manuel de l'amateur de livres du XIXe siècle (1801–1893), 8 volumes, Paris, Rouquette, "must read" literary bibliography of the nineteenth century with very precise entries. The eighth volume contains the index to works cited. Read online
- 1895: François-Ernest Delaplace, born in Rouen 26 November 1835, died in Paris 6 December 1895
- 1895: Note sur l'Histoire des Grecs et des Troyens de Darès, traduite par Charles de Bourgueville
- 1895: Tiphaigne de La Roche et la première idée de la photographie en 1760
- 1896: Les ″Almanachs français″ by M. John Grand-Carteret
- 1896: Les Éditions d'art de M. Édouard Pelletan
- 1897: Le Baron Jérôme Pichon, président de la Société des bibliophiles françois, 1812-1896. Notice suivie de la bibliographie de ses travaux
- 1897: Catalogue du cabinet de feu M. le baron Lucien Double
- 1897: Catalogue de la bibliothèque de feu M. le baron Jérôme Pichon
- 1899: La Bibliothèque d'Eugène Paillet
- 1903: La jeunesse de Balzac. Balzac Imprimeur. 1825–1828, in collaboration with Gabriel Hanotaux, Paris, A. Ferroud, 1e édition. Librairie des Amateurs, A. Ferroud, F. Ferroud, 1921. (The part Balzac imprimeur lists and describes all the books printed by Balzac in his printing workshop.)
- 1916: Le vicomte de Savigny de Moncorps, La Societé des bibliophiles françois. Read online
