= Dawamesc =

Type of cannabis edible in Algeria

Dawamesc is a cannabis edible found in Algeria and some other Arab countries, made of cannabis tops combined with: "sugar, orange juice, cinnamon, cloves, cardamom, nutmeg, musk, pistachios, and pine nuts."

The edible played a role in popularizing cannabis in Europe, as it was this preparation of the drug which Dr. Jacques-Joseph Moreau observed during his travels in Northern Africa, and that he introduced to Paris' Club des Hashischins.
