= Charles Chamois =

French architect

Charles Chamois (c. 1610 – after 1684) was a 17th-century French architect from Paris.

Without being an innovator as was Louis Le Vau at the same period, Chamois remained adept at a simple but effective architecture, without superfluous ornamentation.

== Biography ==
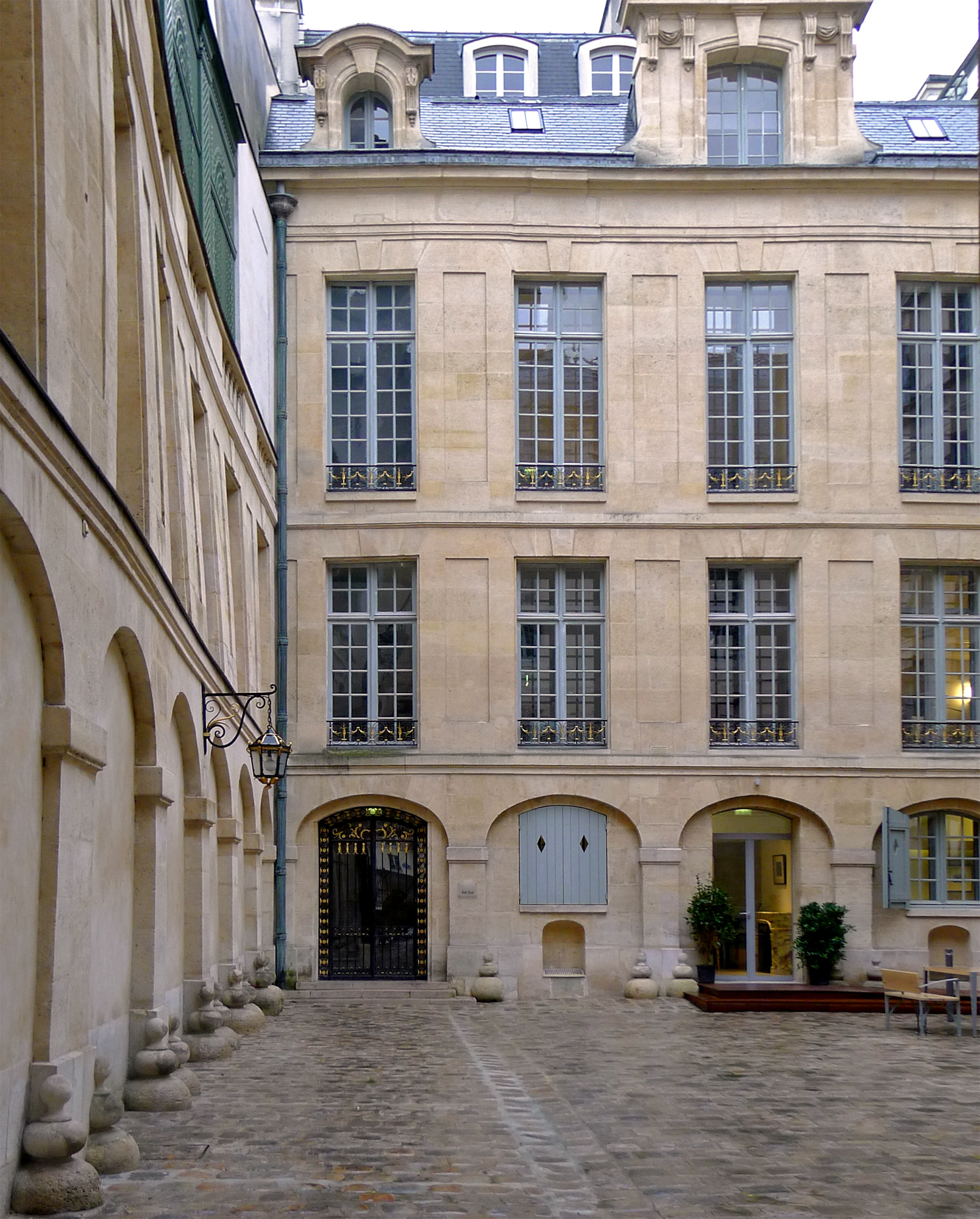
Inner courtyard of the hôtel de Lauzun, circa 1656-1659

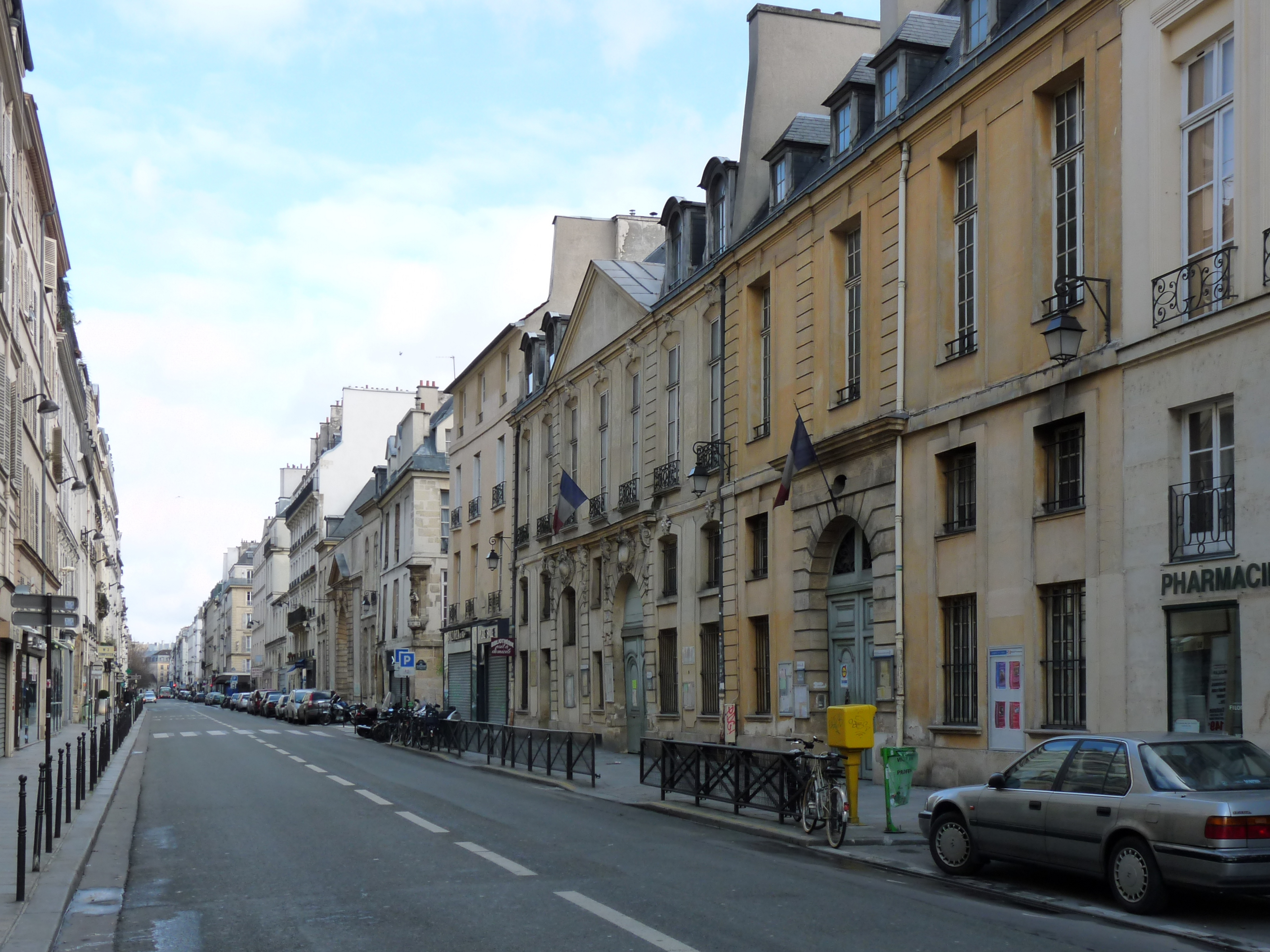
The hôtel particulier at 52 rue de Turenne in Paris is the work of Charles Chamois (right in the foreground)

Around 1630, Chamois built Nicolas Moret's house at 27 rue Saint-Sulpice (Hôtel de Fougères), in Paris.

On 18 June 1633, Chamois rented for 6 years a small house located "rue des Orties, près des Galeries du Louvre", for "100 livres tournois of annual rent". He was then called "Architecte du Roi, bourgeois de Paris", before taking the title "architecte des bâtiments du roi" in 1640.

Around 1640–42, he worked on the house of Sieur Galland, rue des Haudriettes in Paris. In 1641, Chamois had a hotel built for Jacques Mérault at 52 rue de Turenne, Paris.

On 18 July 1642, he concluded an estimate and masonry contract for the construction of a double main building and wing in return on a square "rue du Coulombier" (rue du Colombier), belonging to Marie Ferrant, in return for 19,800 livres.

In 1645, he worked on the hotel of Gaspard de Fieubet, 20 place des Vosges. From those years on, he was a close acquaintance of André Le Nôtre.

In 1647, he could be found on the hôtel particulier of Henri de Guénégaud, rue des Francs-Bourgeois in Paris.

On 23 April 1648, he signed with the mason Jean Savaria, "residing together rue des Galeries du Louvre", a contract and estimate of masonry, modified on following 30 April, for the construction "of a large double main building, in place of a deciduous, on a square having exit on the rue des Deux-Boules and rue des Mauvaises-Paroles", for the benefit of François Roger, King's adviser.

An act of 11 November 1650 mentions a "transport" concerning François Chamois, husband of Marguerite Poisson, an act in which Charles Chamois intervened. Was it about his parents?

In the years 1656–1657, Chamois built the Hôtel de Lauzun, on the île Saint-Louis in Paris, for Charles Gruyn des Bordes, a financier quickly enriched under Cardinal Mazarin.

In 1659, he bore the title of "engineer and architect of the king's buildings" and "councillor".

Meanwhile, from 1650 and practically until the end of his life he worked for the Le Tellier family to the realization of the château de Chaville, located between Meudon and Versailles with the collaboration of André Le Nôtre, whom he had known for many years. The construction of this château for one of the most important ministers of the early reign of Louis XIV can be considered a consecration of his career. For the future chancellor, he also exercised his talents for the hotel Le Tellier in Paris (at 39-45 rue des Francs-Bourgeois), still preserved.

In 1669, he worked on the Hôtel Louvois, rue de Richelieu in Paris, for Louis XIV's minister.

In 1671, he was "intendant des places frontières du royaume".

In 1674, he was finally appointed "contrôleur des fortifications des places conquises".

== Main works ==
=== Civilian architecture ===
- Château of Emery-en-Brie
- House of Jean Galland
- House of Marie Guichard, 7 rue Jacob (formerly rue du Colombier), 6th arrondissement of Paris
- Hôtel Mérault, 52 rue de Turenne, 3rd arrondissement of Paris
- House of Gaspard de Fieubet
- House of the Gonbault family
- House of Sanson Le Page
- House of François Roger
- House of the Monnerot brothers
- House of the Vivien family
- House at Chaville
- Château de Chaville
- Hôtel Louvois (Paris)
- Hôtel de Lauzun (Paris)

=== Religious architecture ===
- Filles-Bleues
- Church of the Pères de la Merci (Paris). (Porch of the old convent preserved).
- Cistercian women of Saint-Saëns in Normandy
- Bénédictines of Ville-l'Evêque
- Nouvelles Catholiques
- Visitandines de la rue du Bac
- Bénédictines de Saint-Louis (Rouen)

== Bibliography ==
- Marie-Agnès Férault, Charles Chamois, architecte parisien du XVIIe siècle, 1981, mémoire de maîtrise soutenu à l'Université Paris IV Sorbonne.
- Marie-Agnès Férault, Charles Chamois : architecte parisien (c. 1610-after 1684), p. 117-153, in Bulletin monumental, 1990, volume 148, No 2 Read online
