= Hôtel de Lauzun =

Coordinates: 48°51′06″N 2°21′33″E

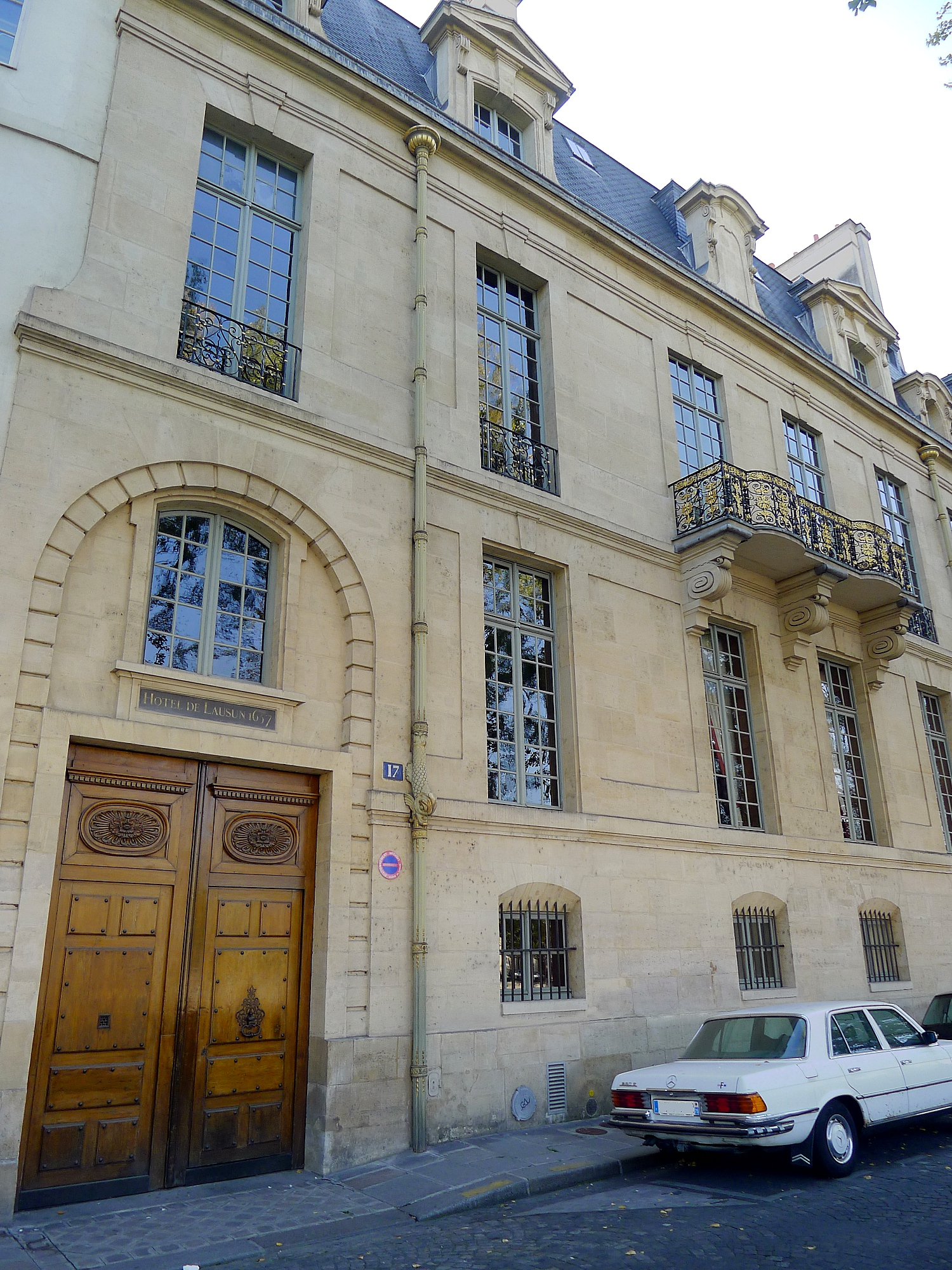
- The north facade, facing the quai d'Anjou and the Seine
- Interactive map of the Hôtel de Lauzun area

General information
- Architectural style: Classicism
- Location: 17, quai d'Anjou, Paris, France
- Construction started: 1657
- Completed: 1658

Design and construction
- Architect: Charles Chamois

The Hôtel de Lauzun (French pronunciation: [otɛl də lozœ̃]) is a 17th-century hôtel particulier, or private mansion, located on the Quai d'Anjou of the île Saint-Louis in the 4th arrondissement of Paris, France. It is among the few Parisian hôtels that retain their rich carved, painted, mirrored and gilded interiors from the time of Louis XIV.

== History ==
The hôtel particulier was not built by the Duc de Lauzun whose name it bears, but by a wealthy financier, Charles Gruyn des Bordes, the son of an inn-keeper grown rich from his trade and richer still, according to at least one pamphleteer, through speculation enabled by his title as general commissioner of cavalry during the civil disorders of the Fronde.

Gruyn des Bordes purchased the lot in 1641, but by the time he was prepared to build, he had new neighbours in the Île Saint-Louis to emulate, namely, the Hôtel Lambert de Thorigny. He married Geneviève de Moÿ by a contract signed on 26 April 1657, and she hastened the construction of the house, which was completed near the end of 1659. The architect was Charles Chamois.

Gruyn's initial 'G' is interlaced with his wife's'M' on chimneybreasts and throughout the decor. Gruyn, however, had Nicolas Fouquet as a patron and shared in Fouquet's disastrous fall. An inquiry into his financial dealings found him guilty of fraud; he was thrown into prison and died there. His widow, having kept her financial affairs separate from his, survived his ruin and left the hotel to her son.

In the meantime, Antoine Nompar de Caumont, Duc de Lauzun, had fallen from Louis XIV's favour and spent a decade in prison. Once he clandestinely wed his lover, La Grande Mademoiselle, she ransomed him from the King and he immediately purchased the building from de Mony's son. Lauzun enriched many of the interiors. The Hôtel de Lauzun passed on to the great-niece of Cardinal Mazarin, who fled from the convent of Chaillot with the Marquis de Richelieu and eloped with him to London. In 1709 the Marquis de Richelieu sold the house to Pierre-François Ogier, Receveur général du Clergé who further enriched its interiors.

In the 18th century, the Hôtel de Lauzun retained its aristocratic owners (now the Marquis de Pimôdan) until the French Revolution. With that event, the estate, like many of its once-grand neighbours, had its upstairs chambers and attics divided into apartments and rented by successful artisans. In the 1840s, when the building (now known as Hôtel Pimodan) belonged to the bibliophile and collector, baron Jérôme Pichon, auditor for the Conseil d'État, the upstairs apartments were rented to Charles Baudelaire (in 1843, for 350 francs) and Théophile Gautier. These two residents formed their Club des Hashischins, where they experimented with hashish. While residing there, Baudelaire wrote the first poems of Les Fleurs du Mal.

The Hôtel de Lauzun, protected as a heritage site in 1906 and owned by the City of Paris since 1928, since 2013 houses the Paris Institute for Advanced Study, a research institute in social science, which hosts symposiums or conferences in the building.

The hôtel was featured in Bruno Dumont's 2009 film Hadewijch, and in Roman Polanski's The Ninth Gate, as the apartment of Baroness Kessler.

== Description ==
The building overlooks the Seine to the north of the island and does not fit the most traditional layout of an hôtel particulier, which usually features a main building entre cour et jardin, separated from the street on the front by a courtyard, and facing a private garden on the back. Fitting the exceptional location of the lot, facing the river, Charles Chamois chose to place the main building on the front, and to raise the ground floor to protect it and ensure an enjoyable view of the river. The high foundations serve as a service space. A richly ornamented balcony extends the main room on the street facade. The courtyard forms the back of the hôtel, which does not feature a garden.

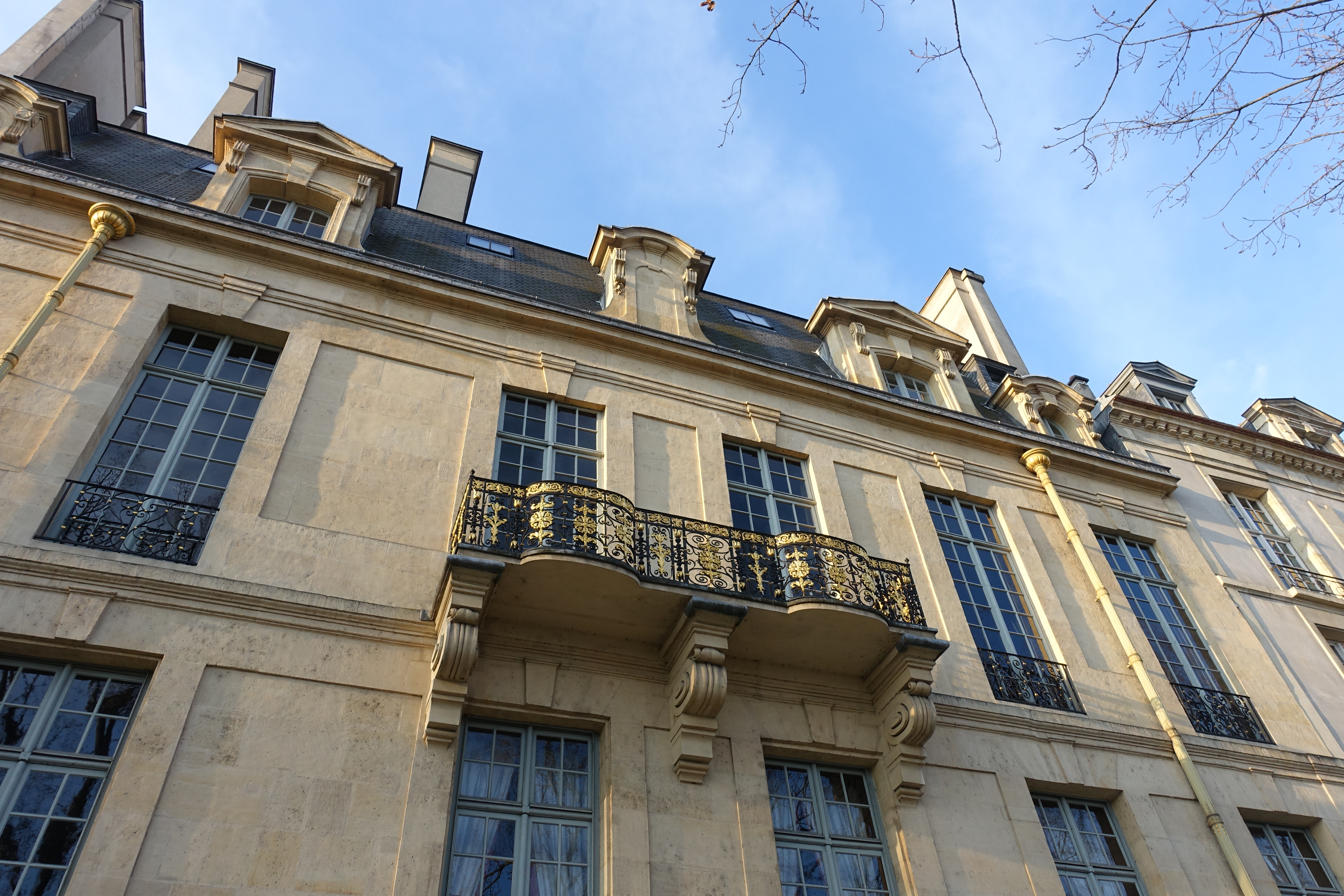
Main facade, on the street

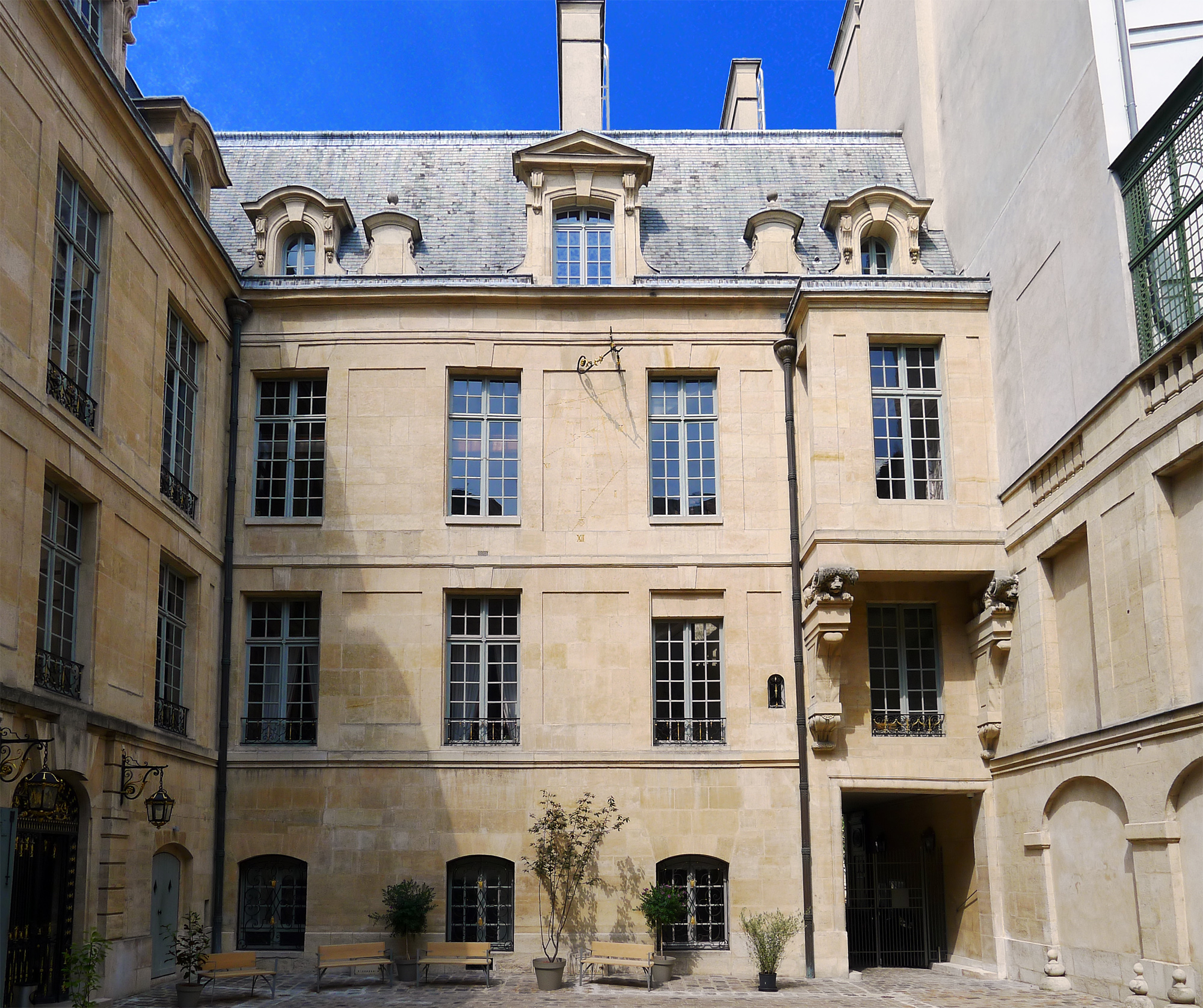
Façade north of the courtyard

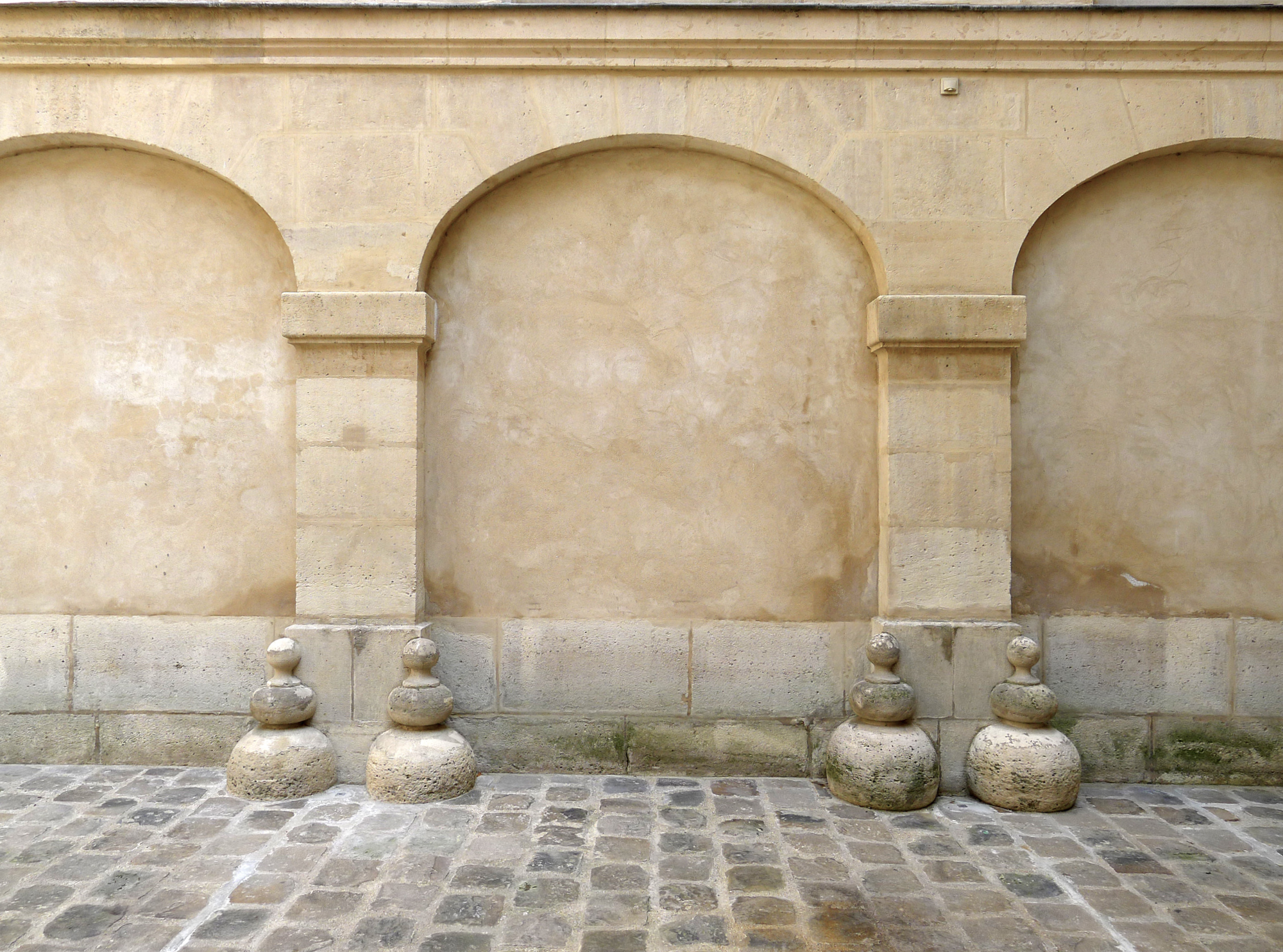
Blind east wall in the courtyard
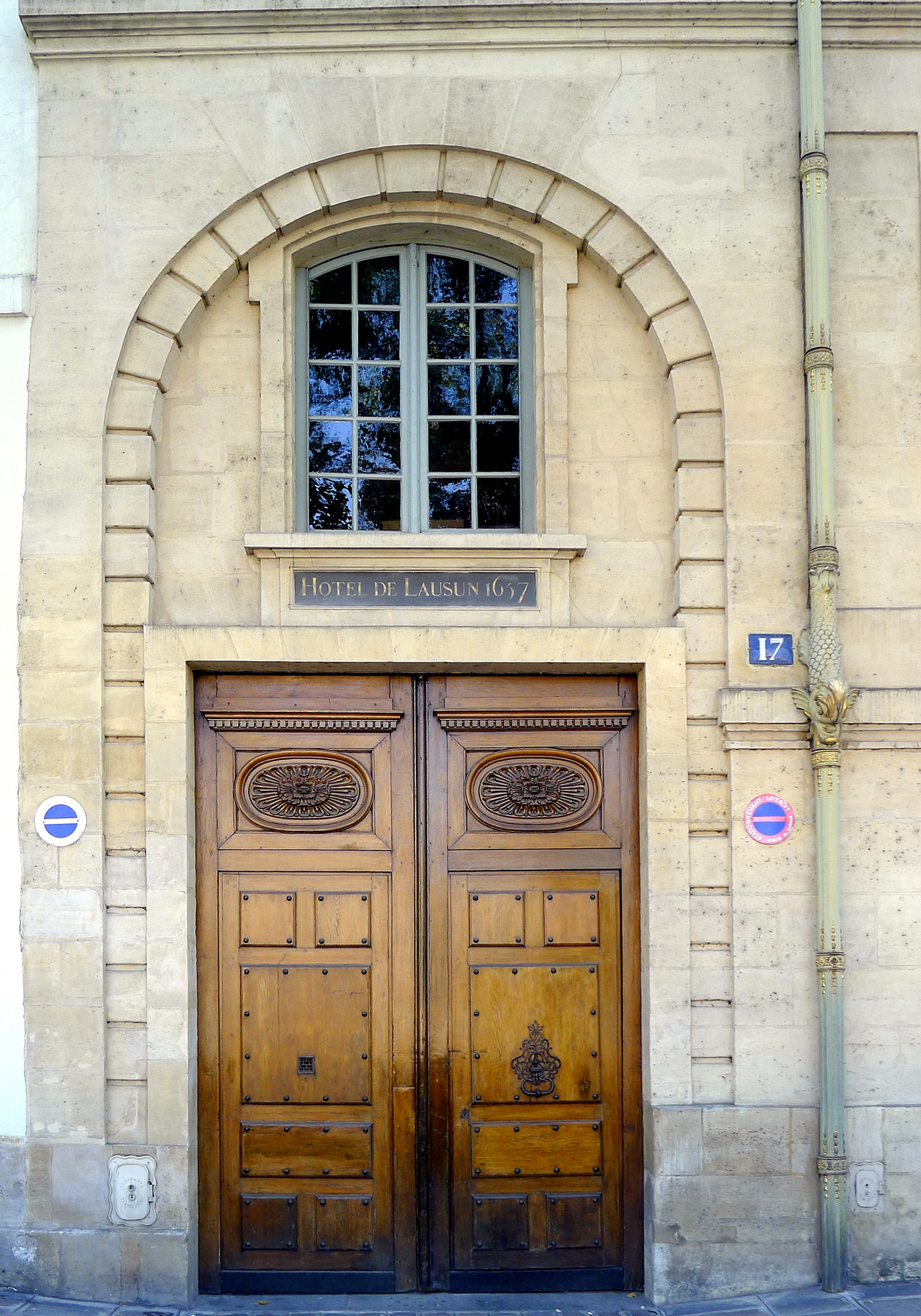
Main portal, with the name and completion date of the hôtel engraved above

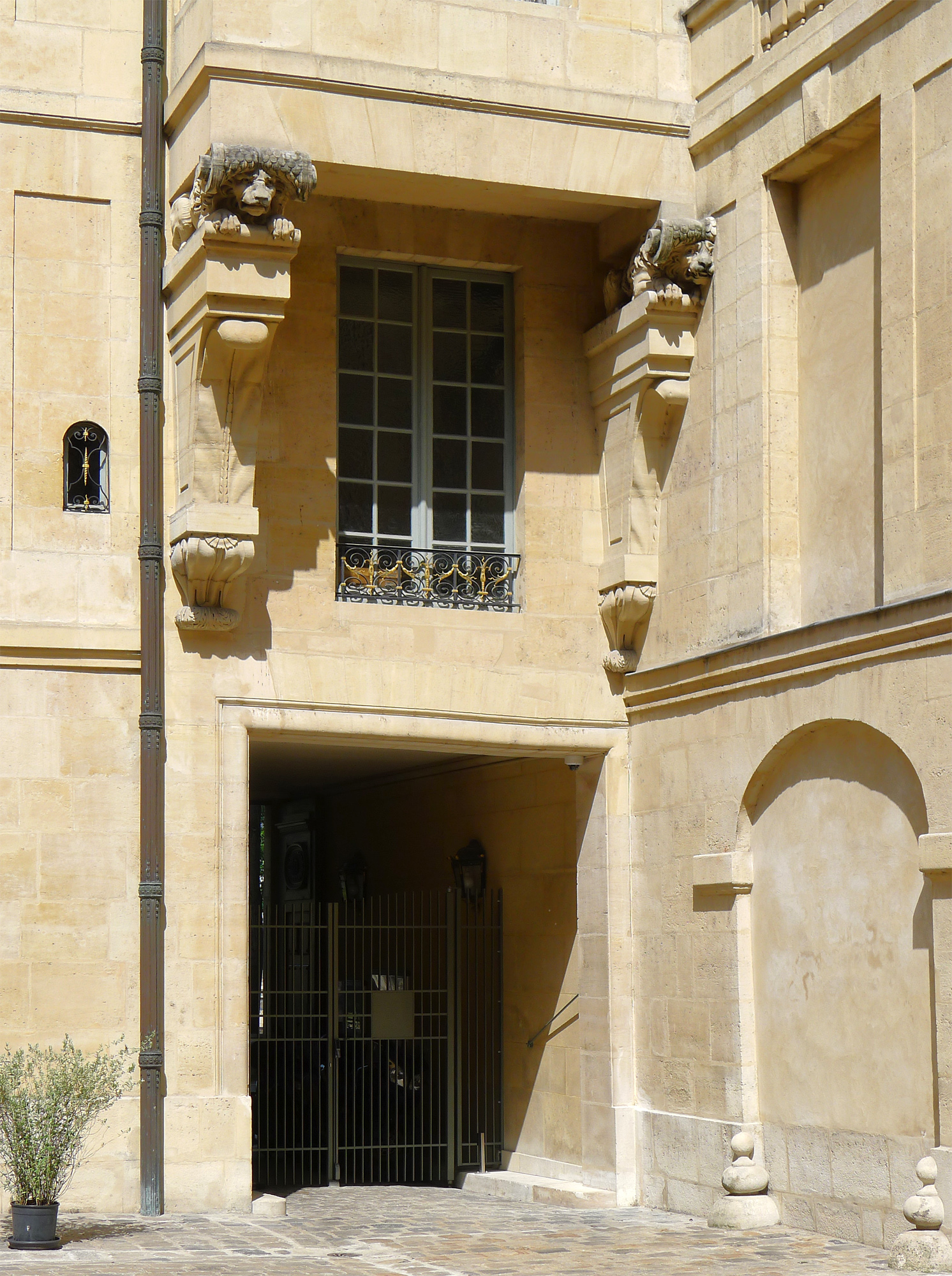
Detail of the north courtyard facade: lion sculptures supporting a small cabinet

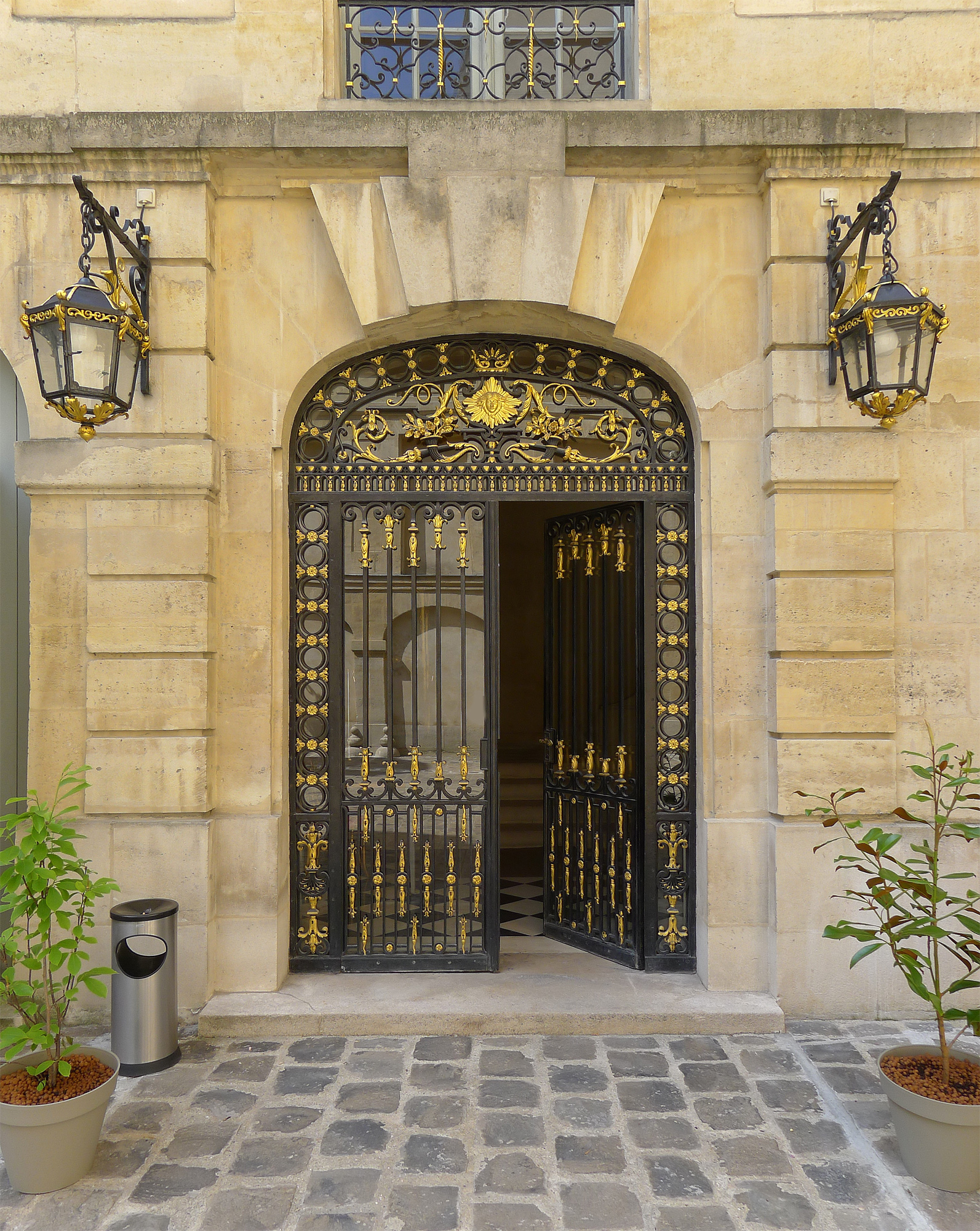
Courtyard door

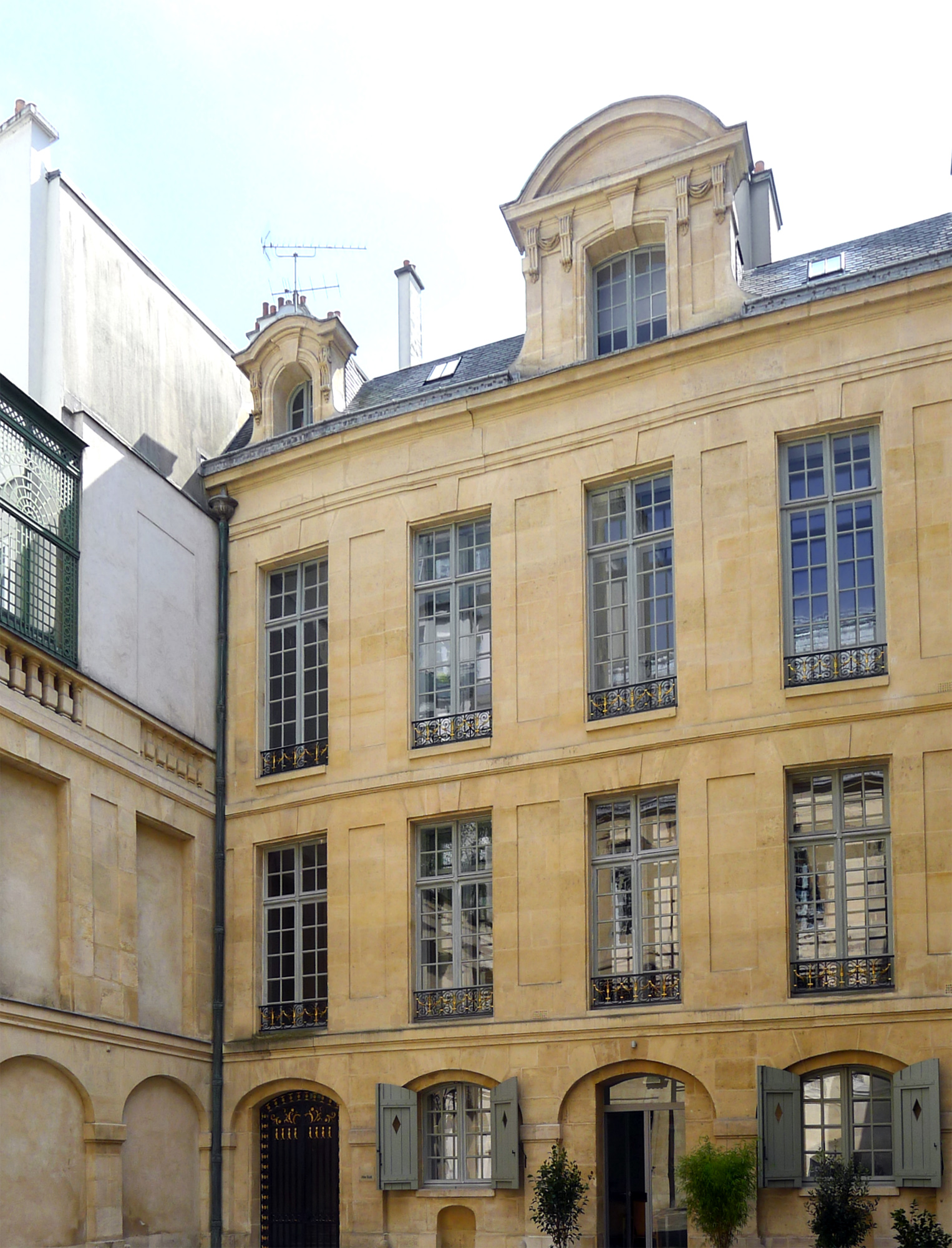
South courtyard facade

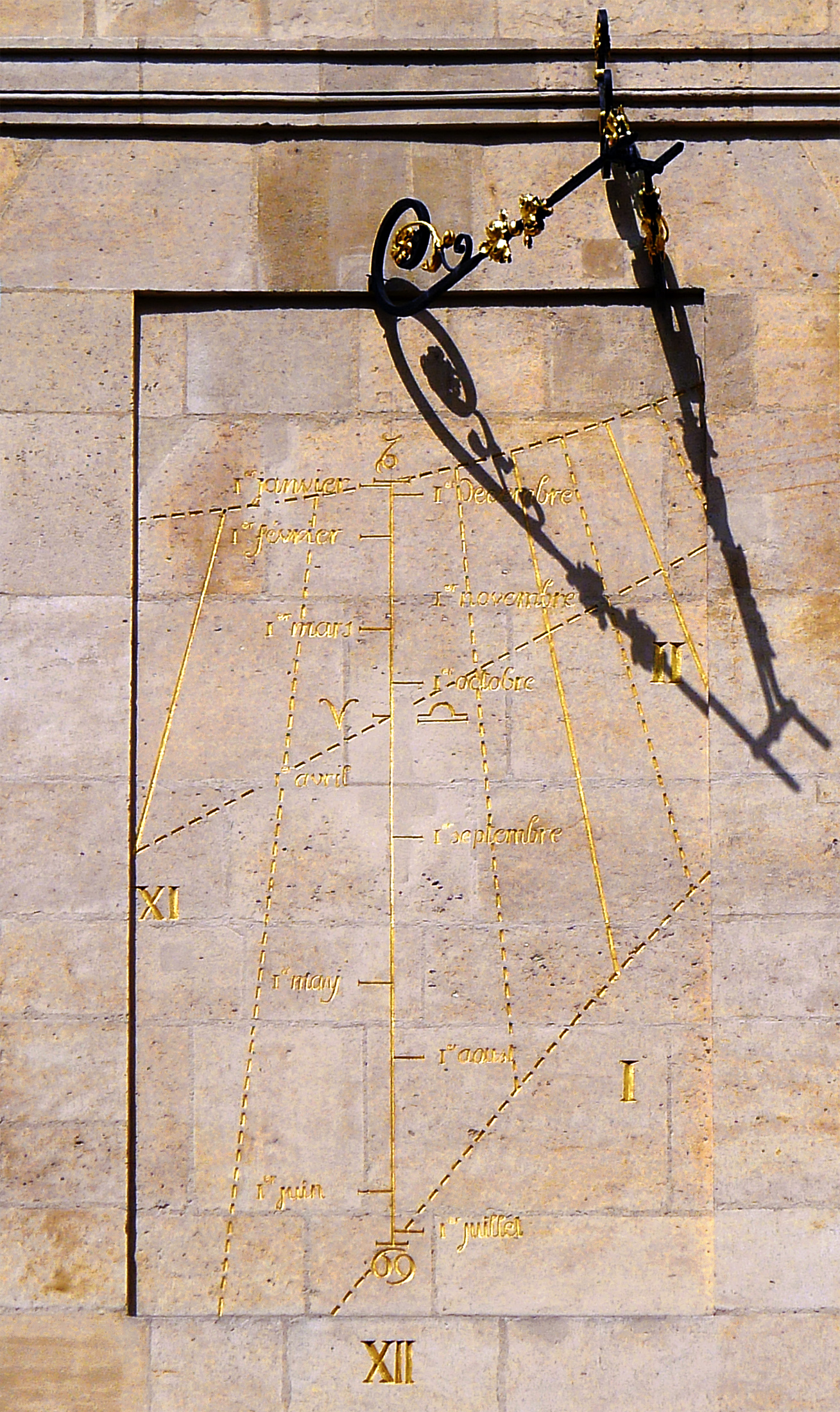
Sundial in the courtyard

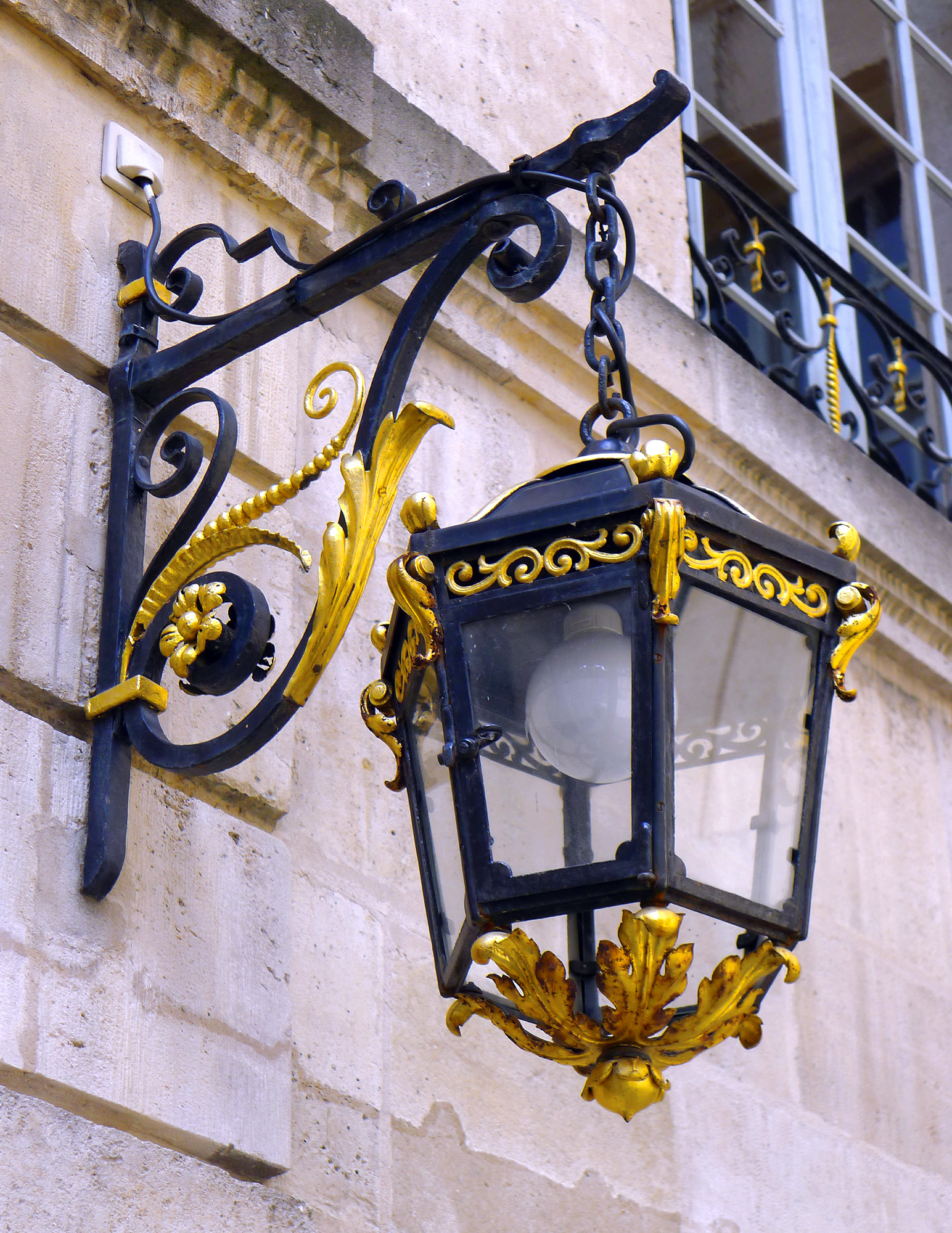
Carved and gilded lantern on the street facade

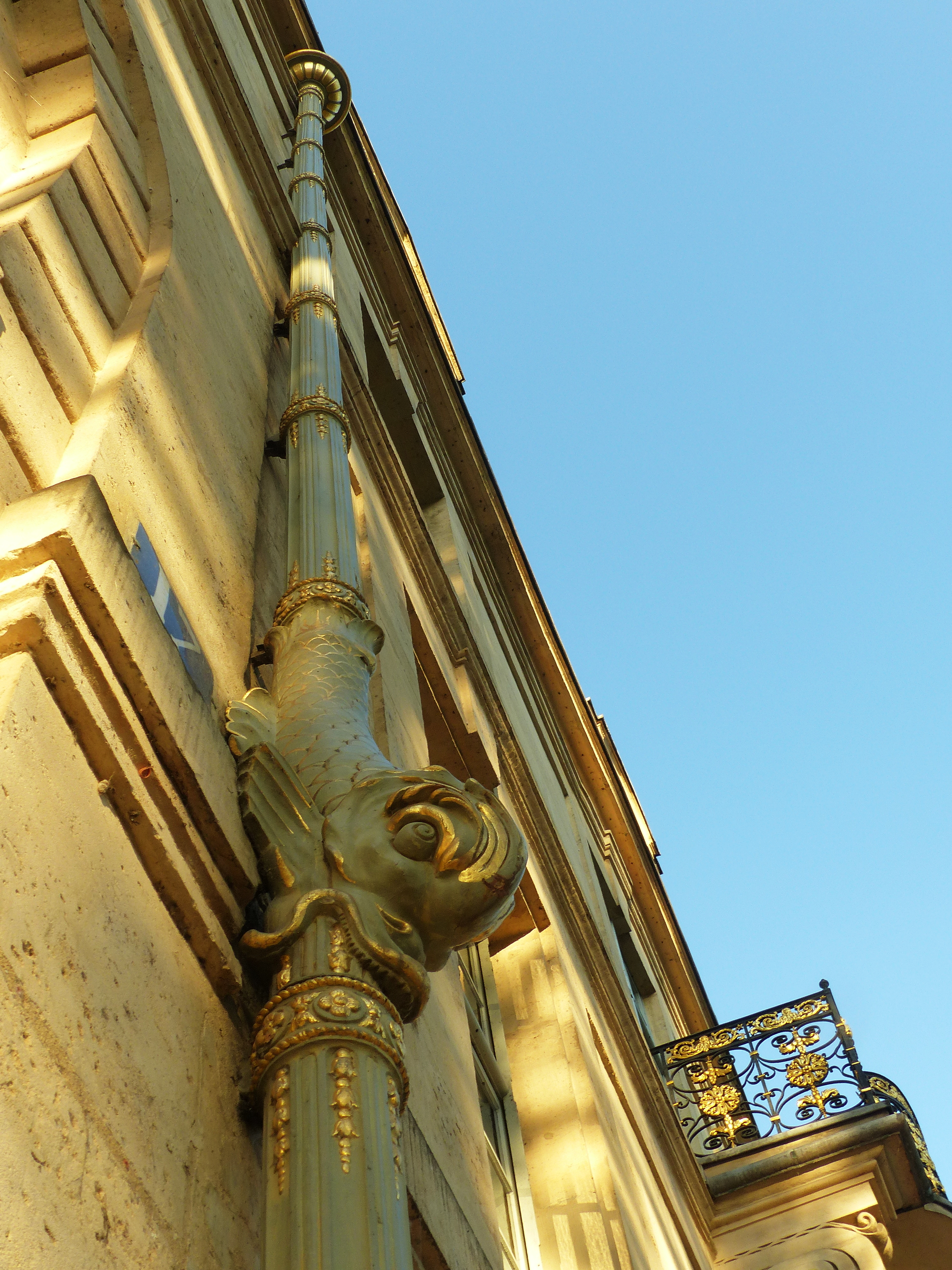
Carved and ornamented 17th century gutter

The hôtel is renowned for its richly decorated interiors, which are among the only ones preserved from the 17th century in Paris. Typical of interiors from the early reign of Louis XIV, it features heavily gilded wall sculptures, and paintings by Michel Dorigny. The main room, or grande chambre, was converted in 1907 into a music salon, topped by a rostrum.

== In popular culture ==
The Hôtel de Lauzun is the Paris home of Jack Rackham and Ann Bonny, aka the Marquis and the Marquise De Belleville, in the fictional pirate romance novels of Alexander De Chastelaine: The Legend of Jack & Ann (2021) ISBN 9798877538955 and Jack & Ann - In the Service of His Majesty (2023) ISBN 9798878990738.

== Bibliography ==
- Boulhares, Raymond and Soleranski, Marc (2015). L'hôtel de Lauzun : trésor de l'île Saint-Louis. Paris: Artélia. ISBN 9782919096022.
- Gady, Alexandre (2008). Les hôtels particuliers de Paris, du Moyen-Âge à la Belle époque. Paris: Parigramme. ISBN 9782840962137.
