= François Achille Longet =

French anatomist and physiologist (1811–1871)

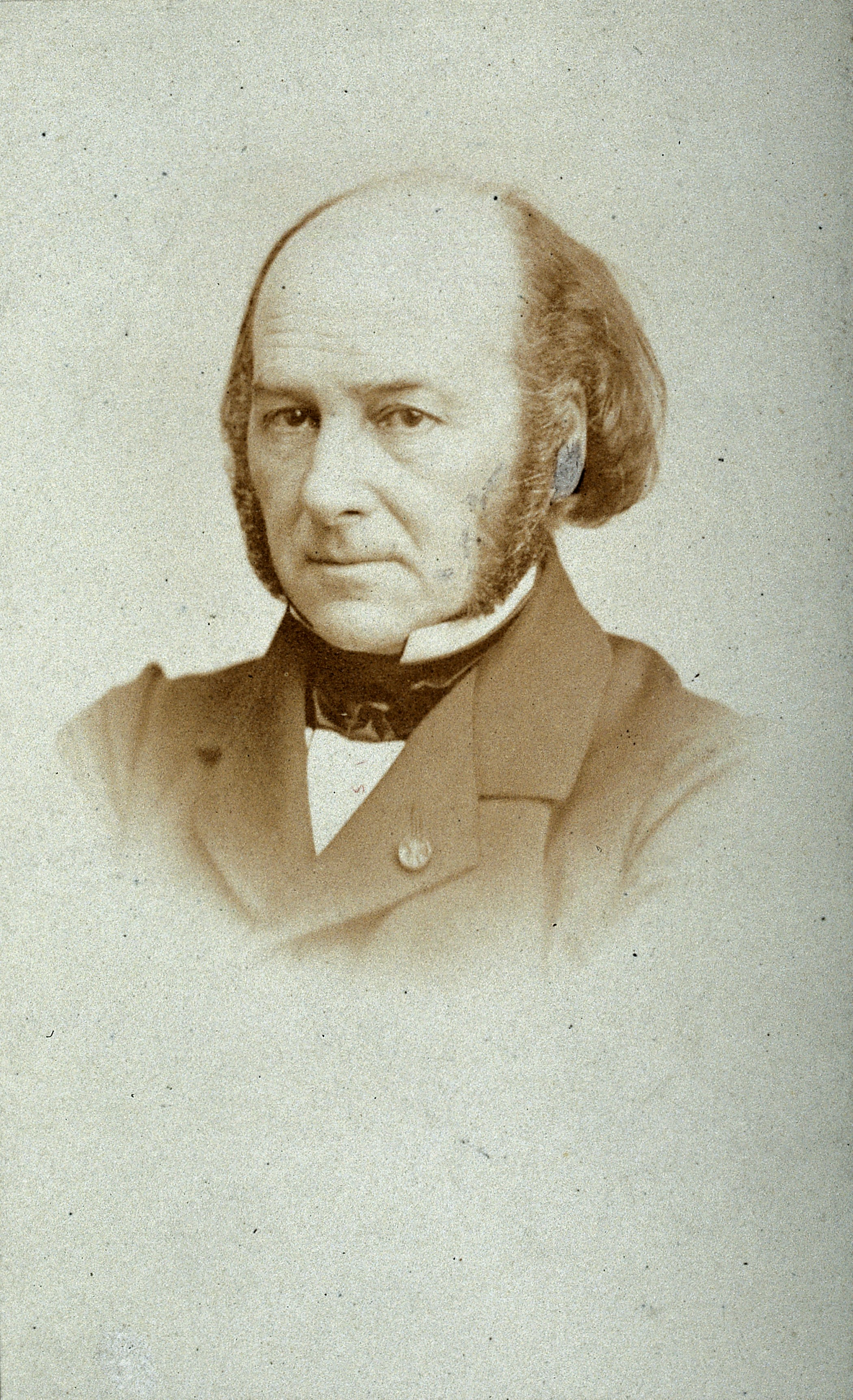
François Achille Longet

François Achille Longet (25 May 1811 – 20 April 1871) was a French anatomist and physiologist who was a native of Saint Germain-en-Laye, Yvelines.

He was a student of François Magendie (1783–1855), and a pioneer in the field of experimental physiology. In 1853 he attained the chair of physiology of the Faculté de Médecine in Paris. One of his better known students was German physiologist Moritz Schiff (1823–1896).

Longet is remembered for extensive research of the autonomic nervous system, and physiological experiments of the anterior and posterior columns of the spinal cord in regards to sensory and motor functionality. Also, he is credited with providing a detailed comprehensive description of nerve innervation of the larynx. With Jean Pierre Flourens (1794–1867), he performed pioneer experiments on the effects of ether and chloroform on the central nervous system in laboratory animals.

== Selected writings ==
In 1843, with Jacques-Joseph Moreau (1804–1884), Jules Baillarger (1809–1890) and Laurent Alexis Philibert Cerise (1807–1869), he founded the Annales médico-psychologiques, a journal of psychiatry that is still in publication today. The following are a few of his notable writings:

- Recherches expérimentales et pathologiques sur les propriétés et les fonctions des faisceaux de la moelle épinière et des racines des nerfs rachidiens (1841) - Pathological and experimental research on the properties and functions of the spinal cord and spinal nerve roots.
- Traité l'Anatomie et Physiologie du Système nerveux de l'Homme et des Animaux vertébrés (1842) - Treatise on the anatomy and physiology of the nervous system in humans and vertebrate animals.
- Traite de physiologie (1850–) - Treatise of physiology.
