= Laurent Cerise =

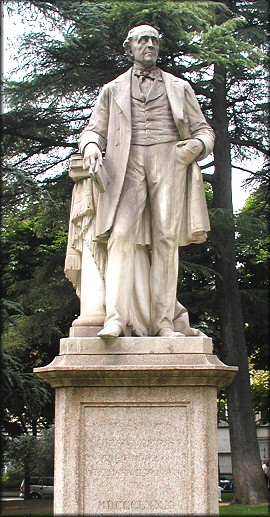
Monument to Laurent Cerise in Aosta

Laurent Alexis Philibert Cerise (27 February 1807 – 5 October 1869) was a French medical doctor born in Aosta (today part of Italy).

He studied medicine at the University of Turin, obtaining his doctorate in 1828. In 1831 he relocated to Paris, where he subsequently drew a large clientele, both rich and poor.

His early written articles appeared in the magazine L'Européen, and due to their social and philosophical content, gained the attention of the learned society in Paris. In 1836 he published "Le Médecin des salles d'asile", a treatise in which he maintains that underprivileged children should have the same access to a physician as do children of the wealthy. The same year he released "L'Exposé et examen critique du système phrénologique de Gall" (Presentation and review of Franz Joseph Gall's phrenological system), where he disparages the limitations of purely "materialistic medicine".

Another noted work of his was "Des fonctions et des maladies nerveuses dans leurs rapports avec l'e´ducation sociale et privee, morale et physique" (Functions and nervous diseases in their dealings with private and social education, moral and physical, 1840). In 1843 with Jacques-Joseph Moreau (1804–1884), Jules Baillarger (1809–1890) and François Achille Longet (1811–1871), he founded the psychiatric journal "Annales médico-psychologiques".

During his career, he maintained close ties with principal figures of the Italian Risorgimento. In 1853 he became a member of the Accademia delle Scienze de Turin, and in 1864 became a member of the Académie de Médecine in Paris.
