= Moritz Schiff =

German physiologist

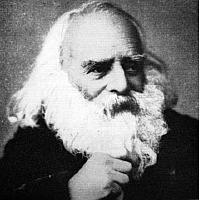
Moritz Schiff

Moritz Schiff (28 January 1823, Frankfurt – 6 October 1896, Geneva) was a German physiologist and the elder brother of the chemist Hugo Schiff (1834-1915), particularly known for his staining technique.

He made major contributions to human physiology, including studies of the circulatory system and the action of the vagus nerve.

Despite his independent and original spirit and being a much-cited author, he never reached the popularity of his contemporaries Emil du Bois-Reymond, Hermann von Helmholtz and Charles-Édouard Brown-Séquard.

== Biography ==
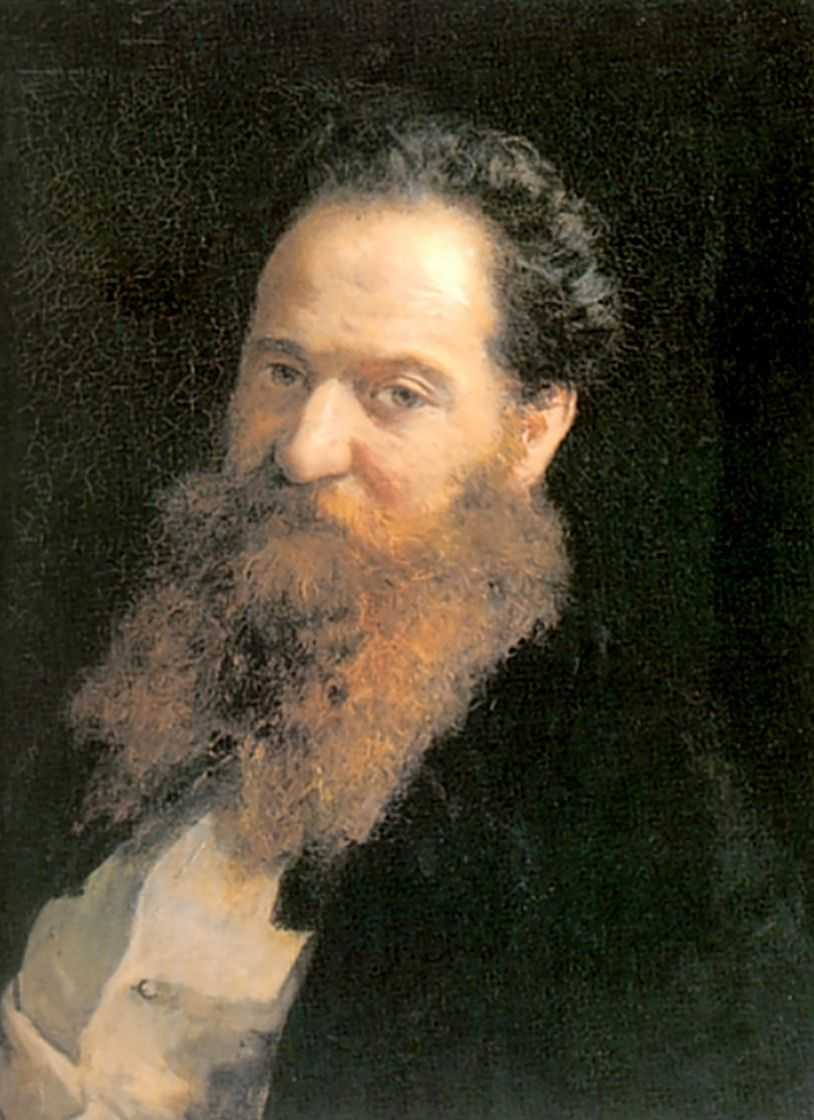
Moritz Schiff, 1876

Born into a family of Jewish merchants, Moritz Schiff can be considered as the archetype of the great nineteenth-century scientist, one of the pioneers of the experimental method in physiology as well as a polyglot, who published his articles in German, French or Italian indifferently. He began his studies in his hometown, at the Senckenberg Institute, from which he then moved to Heidelberg, then to Berlin and finally to Göttingen where he obtained a doctorate in medicine in 1844.

In Heidelberg, he had Adolf Kussmaul as one of his masters and was deeply influenced by Friedrich Tiedemann's anatomy lessons, which instilled in him a passion for biology, zoology and organic life. Schiff then studied zoology with Lichtenberg and morphology with Johannes Müller in Berlin and then with Rudolf Wagner in Göttingen. He also stayed in Paris where he followed the teachings of François Magendie, later professor at the College de France, François Achille Longet and Pierre Flourens. In this period he had the chance to see real life applications of zoology at the Musée du Jardin des Plantes.

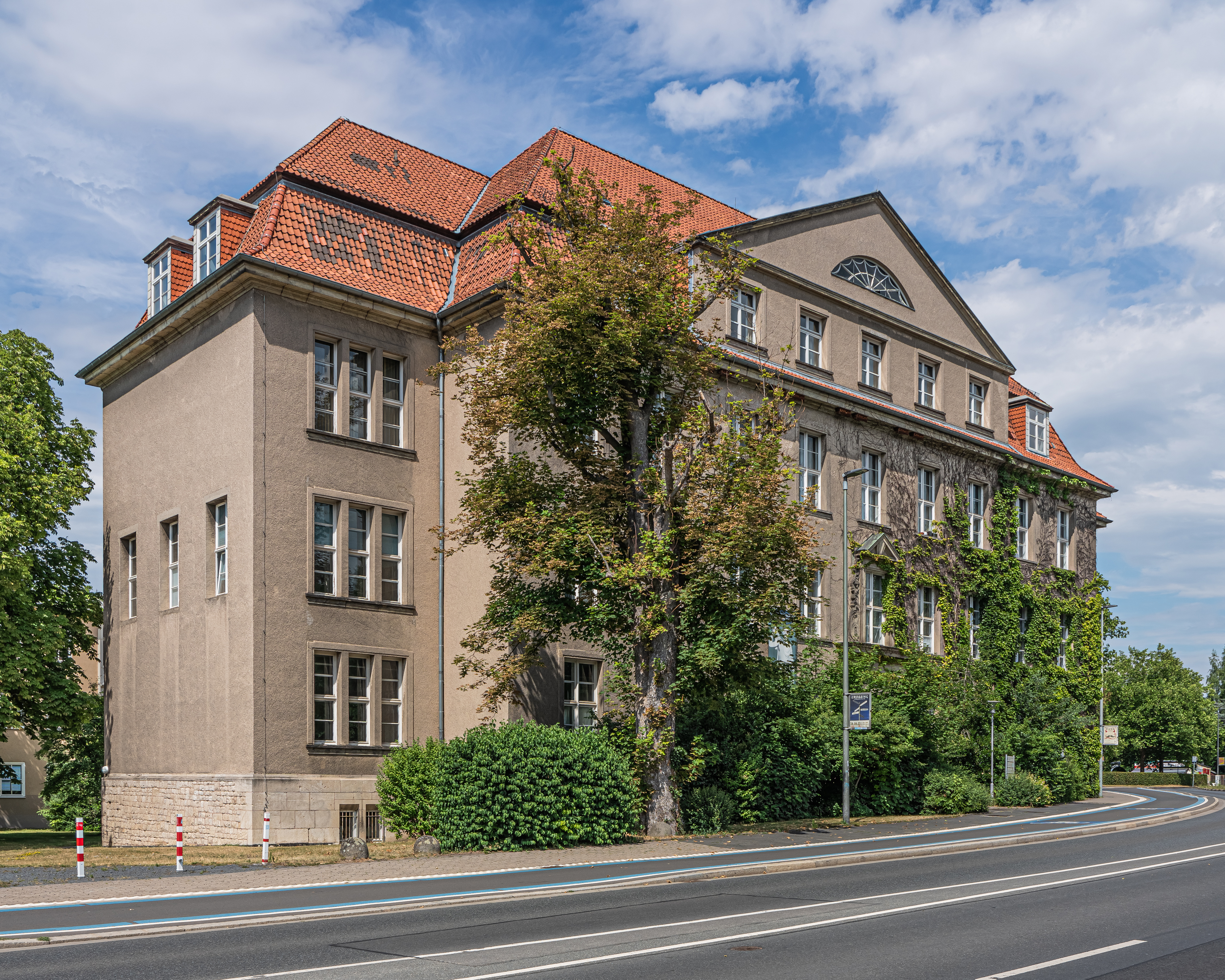
Gőttingen Institute

Back in Frankfurt, he became director of the ornithological section of the Senckenberg Museum and devoted himself to research in a small personal laboratory and in 1848 served in the revolutionary troops of Baden as a surgeon and for this reason will often be criticized for positions "too dangerous for young people". The son of his teacher Friedrich Tiedemann was killed during this revolt.

In the following years Schiff helped Charles-Lucien Bonaparte with the systematics of South American birds in his "Conspectus generum avium" and in his honor the genus Schiffornis was erected.

He then converted to Protestantism to marry Elisabeth Schleuning of Darmstadt in 1860, after his first marriage to Claudia Gitta Trier in 1853.

After moving to Bern for political reason, he was an assistant professor of anatomy and comparative physiology from 1854 to 1862, under the direction of Gabriel Valentin and from 1862 to 1876 professor of physiology and zoology at the Institute of Higher Studies in Florence at the invitation of Carlo Matteucci.

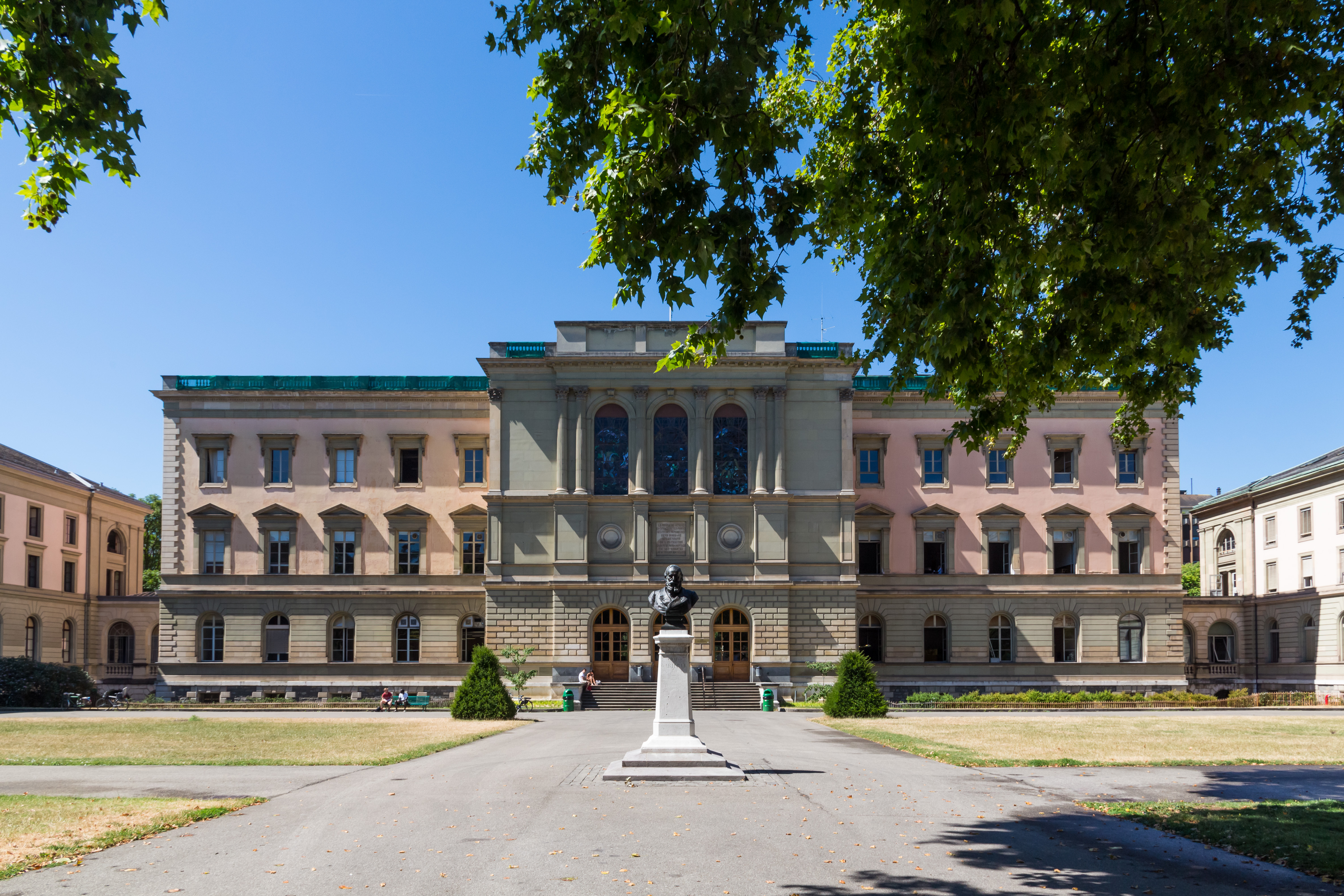
University of Geneva

In 1874, Schiff's laboratory was visited by the Society for the Prevention of Cruelty to Animals. They found many dogs with wide deep wounds under their throats. Schiff admitted the incisions were made to prevent the animals howling and disturbing the neighbourhood. He was then violently criticized and even sued by leagues who opposed vivisection. At the end, however, he was one of the first to use anesthesia (chloroform and ether) in animal experiments. This controversy, as well as his lack of means, forced him to leave Florence.

Thanks to the initiative of Carl Vogt, soon to be Rector of the University of Geneva, he accepted the chair of physiology after the refusal of Charles-Édouard Brown-Séquard and started teaching there. In Geneva he continued his research and teaching activities for nearly twenty years, from 1876 until his death at the age of seventy three. The chair of the physiology department of the Geneva medical faculty was then occupied by the neurologist Jean-Louis Prévost.

Mortiz Schiff is identified, like his correspondents Jakob Moleschott and Carl Vogt, as one of the proponents of materialism and with the help of these latter two and Alexandre A. Herzen tried to found a positivist magazine, focused on anticlerical propaganda.

He will also defend the theses of evolution that were put forward by Charles Darwin with whom he corresponded as well.

Without ever founding a school, he had as pupils, disciples or assistants: Alexandre A. Herzenson), Waldemar Haffkine, Nathan Loewenthal, Hillel Joffé and Angelo Mosso.

He was appointed foreign partner of the Accademia dei Lincei in 1892.

== Works ==
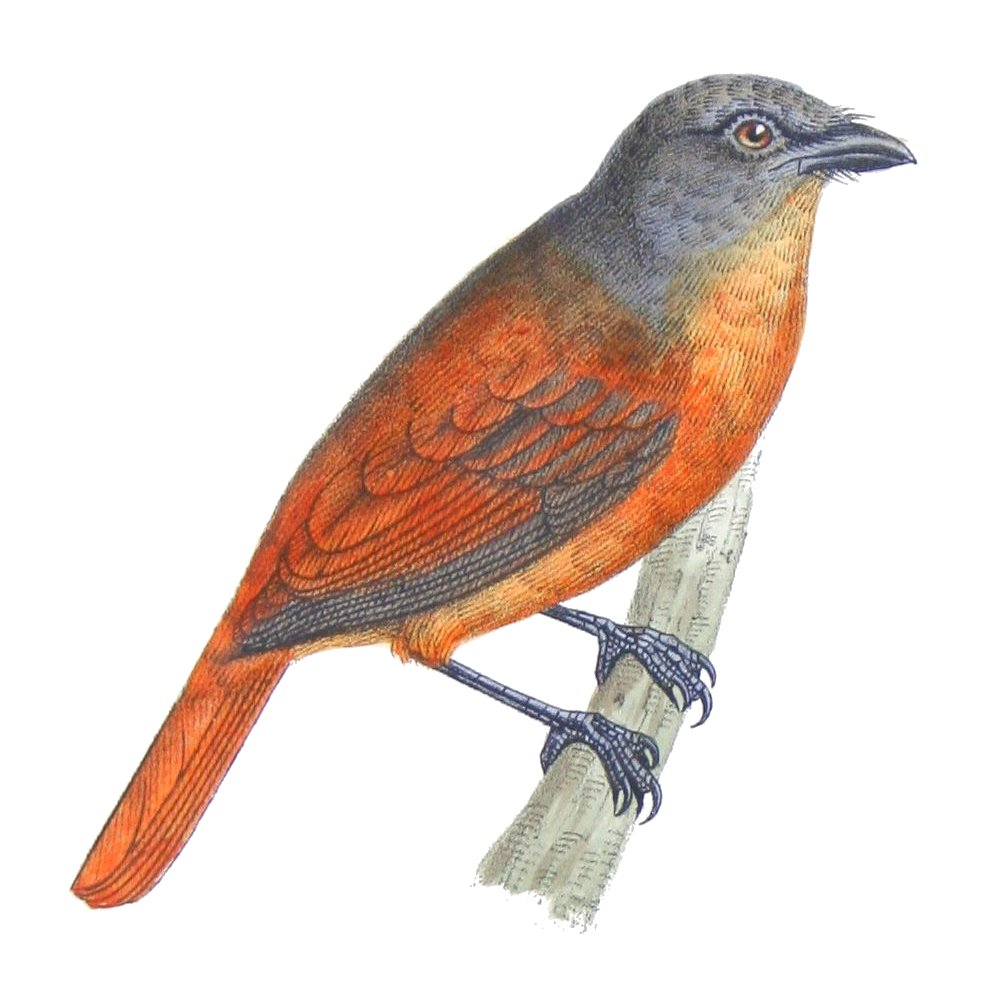
Bird belonging to the genus Schiffornis

Schiff was a tireless researcher and according to various testimonies, he multiplied and repeated his experiments, even after some years to verify their results. At the end, he was the author of nearly two hundred scientific publications which were collected in four volumes between 1894 and 1898 (the last volume posthumous) and covered many areas of human and animal physiology:

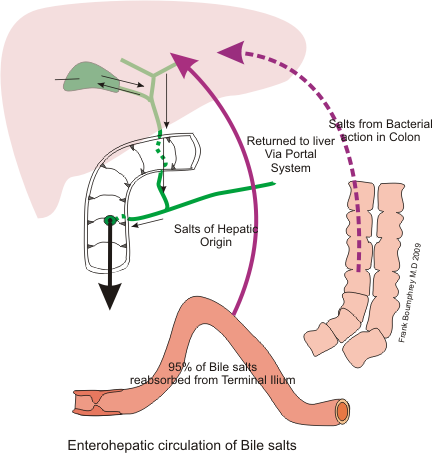
The enterohepatic cycle of bile or Schiff's biliary cycle

- Regarding the nervous system physiology, he studied the functions of the vagus nerve, spinal cord, and cerebellum, as well as the innervation of the heart. He then described what will later be called the Sherrington cross reflex or the Schiff-Sherrington phenomenon, and moreover, contributed to the description of the sensory pathways of the spinal cord by simultaneously performing hemisections, as his colleague Charles-Édouard Brown-Séquard was doing in those years.
- In digestive physiology, he researched the role of pepsin and showed that nutrients are broken down by digestive juices; these studies allowed him to describe the enterohepatic cycle of bile to which he gave his name (Schiff's biliary cycle).
- In circulatory and cardiac physiology, he studied the control of the cardiac and vascular activity by the autonomic nervous system and was the first, in 1850, to demonstrate the existence of a refractory period to the excitability of the heart muscle, and, above all, to give an observation of open-chest heart massage in animals, paving the way for the first cardiac resuscitation manoeuvres in medicine.
- Finally, he was interested in the effects of various anesthetics (chloroform, ether ...) and toxic substances (strychnine, curare, cocaine, Calabar bean) like his colleague Claude Bernard.

During his stay in Bern, he nurtured the project to publish a complete treatise on physiology, of which only the first volume was finally published between 1858 and 1859 dedicated to the physiology of muscles and nerves. In this volume, he clearly showed that the removing of the thyroid gland from dogs was fatal, and later showed that the injection of animal extract or thyroid transplantation can prevent death. Subsequently, he successfully used thyroid extract to treat humans.

== Some writings ==
- Untersuchungen zur Physiologie des Nervensystems mit Berücksichtigung der Pathologie Stahël'sche, Frankfurt-am-Main, 1855
- Ueber die Rolle des pankratischen Saftes und der Galle bei Auf nahme der Fette, Verlag von Meidinger Sohn & Comp. Frankfurt-am-Main, 1857
- Lehrbuch der Physiologie des Menschen - Teil I. Muskel- und Nervenphysiologie, Lahr, Schauenburg & C. 1858-1859
- Zuckerbildund in der Leber und den Einfluss des Nervensystems auf die Diabetes, Stahël'sche, Würzburg, 1859
- Schweizerische Zeitschrift für Heilkunde, J. Dalp'schen, Bern, 1862
- Lezioni di fisiologia sperimentale sul sistema nervoso encefalico, Hermann loescher, Florence, 1865
- Leçons sur la physiologie de la digestion faites au Muséum d'histoire Naturelle de Florence Herman Loescher, Florence & Turin, 1867
- Contribution à la physiologie: De l'inflammation et de la circulation, J.-B. Baillière et fils, Paris,1873
- La pupille considérée comme esthésiomètre, Paris, Baillière, 1875
- Recueil des mémoires physiologiques. Lausanne, B. Benda, libraire- éditeur 1894- 1898, published in four volumes (1, 2, 3, 4)

== Bibliography ==
- Anonymous: Moritz Schiff (1823-1896). Experimental physiologist, JAMA. March 25, 1968 Baltimore, Johns Hopkins Press
- J. J. Dreifuss: Moritz Schiff et la vivisection. Gesnerus, 1985 pag. 289-303.
- J.J. Dreifuss: Moritz Schiff et la transplantation thyroidienne un aspect de début de l'endocrinology expérimatale. Rev. Med. Suisse Romande, Dec.1984 pag.1957-65.
- J.J. Dreifuss: L'arrivée de la physiologie expérimentale à Genève (1876). Rev. Med. Suisse Romande, 2008, pag. 2288-91.
- J.R. Ewald: Schiff, Moritz. Deutsche Biographie (ADB). Band 54, Duncker & Humblot, Leipzig 1908 pag. 8–11.
- M. Feinsod: Moritz Schiff (1823–1896): A Physiologist in Exile. Rambam Maimonides Medical Journal. 2011;2 Integral text
- H. Friedenwald: Notes on Moritz Schiff (1823-1896). Chapter XXXVI: The Jews and medicine.1944.
- P. Guarnieri: Moritz Schiff (1823-1896). Experimental Physiology and Noble Sentiment in Florence.
- W. Haymaker, Schiller F.ed.: The founders of neurology, One hundred and forty-six biographical sketches by eighty-eight authors. Springfield (Ill.),1970.
- Józefa Joteyko: La dualité fonctionnelle du muscle par Melle, Revue internationale d'électrothérapie,1904.
- A. Loucif: Moritz Schiff, la vie et les carnets de laboratoire d'un physiologiste du XIXe siècle. Thèse de Médecine, No 206. Université Louis Pasteur. Strasbourg, 2003, pag 174.
- P. Riedo: Der Physiologe Moritz Schiff (1823-1896) und die Innervation des Herzens., Université de Zürich,1971.
- Nicolaas Adrianus Rupke: Vivisection in Historical Perspective, London and New York: Routledge, 1987 pag 105-24.
- K.E. Rothschuh: History of Physiology, Huntington NY, Krieger, 1973.
- Jean Starobinski: Le Concept de cénesthésie et les Idées neuropsychologiques de Moritz Schiff» Gesnerus, vol. 34, 1977, p. 2-20
- Jean Starobinski: Brève histoire de la conscience du corps, in Revue française de psychanalyse. 1981.
- Georges Surbled: L'influx nerveux et l'électricité, Revue internationale d'électrothérapie.1891.
- F. Vallejo-Manzur, J. Varon, R. Fromm Jr, P. Baskett: Moritz Schiff and the history of open-chest cardiac massage, resuscitation. April 2002.
