= Rue Saint-Sulpice (Paris) =

Street in Paris, France

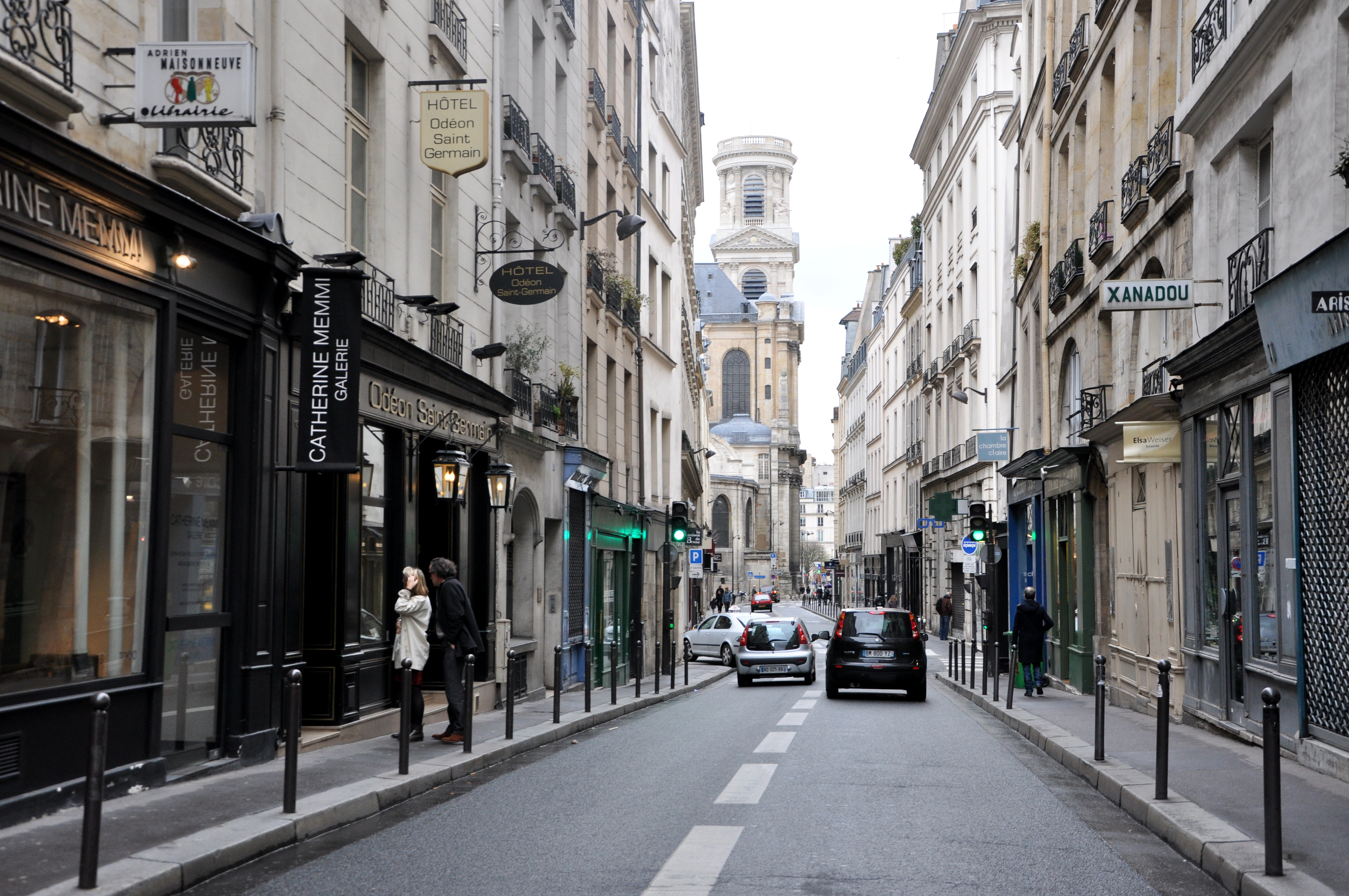
- Rue Saint-Sulpice heading toward the Place Saint-Sulpice; in the background, the north tower of Saint-Sulpice Church
- Interactive map of Rue Saint-Sulpice
- Former names: Between the Rue de Condé and the Rue de Tournon: Rue du Petit-Lion-Saint-Sulpice (1501); Rue de la Foire (1514-1530); Rue Combault (1524); Rue du Petit-Lion (1565); Rue du Clos-Bruneau (1595) Between the Rue de Tournon and the Place Saint-Sulpice: Rue du Petit-Bourbon; Rue Saint-Sulpice (1580); Petite-rue-Saint-Sulpice (1616); Rue du Petit-Bourbon (1628); Rue du 31-Mai (1793); Rue du Petit-Bourbon (1815) Between the Rue Garancière and the Place Saint-Sulpice: Rue de l'Aveugle (1636); Rue des Prêtres (1642-1652); Rue des Aveugles (1697-1815)
- Length: 294 m (965 ft)
- Width: Minimum: 10 m
- Location: 6th arrondissement, Paris, France
- Quarter: Saint-Sulpice, Saint-Germain-des-Prés, Odéon
- Nearest metro station: Line 4 at Saint-Sulpice and Odéon stations, Line 10 at Odéon station
- Coordinates: 48.85137°N 2.336226°E
- From: 4, Rue de Condé
- To: 2, Place Saint-Sulpice

Construction
- Commissioned: 1851

The Rue Saint-Sulpice is a street in Paris, located in the 6th arrondissement.

== Location and access ==
The Rue Saint-Sulpice is a public street situated in the neighborhoods of Saint-Sulpice, Saint-Germain-des-Prés, and the Odéon district. It runs along the northern side of the Saint-Sulpice Church.

The area is served by Line 4 at the Saint-Sulpice and Odéon stations, as well as Line 10 at the Odéon station.

== Origin of the name ==
The street is named after the Saint-Sulpice Church, which it borders.

== History ==
The Rue Saint-Sulpice was formed in 1851 through the merger of the former Rue du Petit-Bourbon and Rue du Petit-Lion.

=== Rue du Petit-Lion ===
The former Rue du Petit-Lion extended from the Rue de Condé to the Rue de Tournon. Opened around 1500, it was initially called "ruelle descendant à la rue neuve de la Foire" or "ruelle allant à la Foire" (referring to the Saint-Germain Market). By the 17th century, it became known as the Rue du Petit-Lion due to a shop sign featuring a lion. It was also referred to as the "Rue du Petit-Lion-Saint-Sulpice" to distinguish it from the Rue du Petit-Lion-Saint-Sauveur (now the Rue Tiquetonne).

=== Rue du Petit-Bourbon ===
The Rue du Petit-Bourbon, connecting to the Saint-Sulpice Church since the 16th century, was formed in 1816 by merging two streets: the Rue du Petit-Bourbon (between the Rue de Tournon and the Rue Garancière) and the Rue des Aveugles (between the Rue Garancière and the Place Saint-Sulpice). Located in the former 11th arrondissement, Luxembourg quarter, the Rue du Petit-Bourbon-Saint-Sulpice began at nos. 1–2 Rue de Tournon and nos. 101–70, ending at nos. 1–2 Rue Garancière and Rue des Aveugles. The street numbers were marked in red, with the highest odd number being 9 and the highest even number 12.

The street was likely named after Louis III de Montpensier, whose mansion was located between the Rue de Tournon and the Rue Garancière. It is cited as the "Rue du Petit Bourbon" in a 1636 manuscript. In 1702, within the Louvre quarter, the street had four houses and four street lanterns. In 1792, it was merged into the Rue du Petit-Lion but renamed the "Rue du 31-Mai" in 1793 to commemorate the fall of the Girondins. It reverted to its original name in 1815.

=== Rue des Aveugles ===
North of the church, between the current Rue Saint-Sulpice and Rue Mabillon, lay the Cimetière des Aveugles. This small cemetery, one of six under the Saint-Sulpice parish, measured 33 by 28 meters, opened in 1664, and closed in 1784. (Note: The 1664 date is questionable, as Jacques Hillairet cites the name "Rue des Aveugles" as early as 1632, suggesting the street may have named the cemetery.) The section between the current Place Saint-Sulpice and Rue Garancière is cited as the "Rue de l'Aveugle" in a 1636 manuscript, later known as the "Rue des Prêtres" (1642), "Rue du Cimetière-Saint-Sulpice," and "Rue des Aveugles" (after 1697). Until the mid-18th century, the Rue des Aveugles extended to the Rue des Canettes, but houses south of this section were demolished to create a small square (part of the current Place Saint-Sulpice). The Rue des Aveugles was incorporated into the Rue du Petit-Bourbon in 1816.

== Notable buildings and places of interest ==
- The Peruvian writer Mario Vargas Llosa (1936–2025) lived on the street.
- No. 15: Former brothel "Chez Alys", now demolished. The name of the establishment remains in a mosaic on the entrance floor.
- No. 21: The writer André Gide lived in the building at the corner of the Rue de Tournon, on the second floor, from the age of six.
- No. 25: A private building where Pierre Guffroy, a film production designer (five-time César winner and 1981 Oscar winner for Tess), and writer Georges Bataille lived. Bataille resided there from 1 March 1962 until his death on 9 July 1962.
- No. 27: Hôtel de Fougères, a private mansion built in 1630 by architect Charles Chamois (1610–1684) for the Countess of Fougères. It is currently owned by the Paris Bar Association.
- No. 28: The young Romanian poetess Julia Hasdeu (1869–1888) lived there, commemorated by a bronze plaque with her likeness in bas-relief.
- No. 29: Former shop of Eulalie Bouasse-Lebel (1809–1898), a publisher of religious images.
- No. 36: Former brothel catering to ecclesiastical clients, still marked by its distinctive gold-on-sky-blue numbering, as mandated by the police.
- Place August-Strindberg, at the intersection with the Rue Garancière, occupies the site of the former Chapelle de la Communion, destroyed by fire in 1799.

== Gallery ==
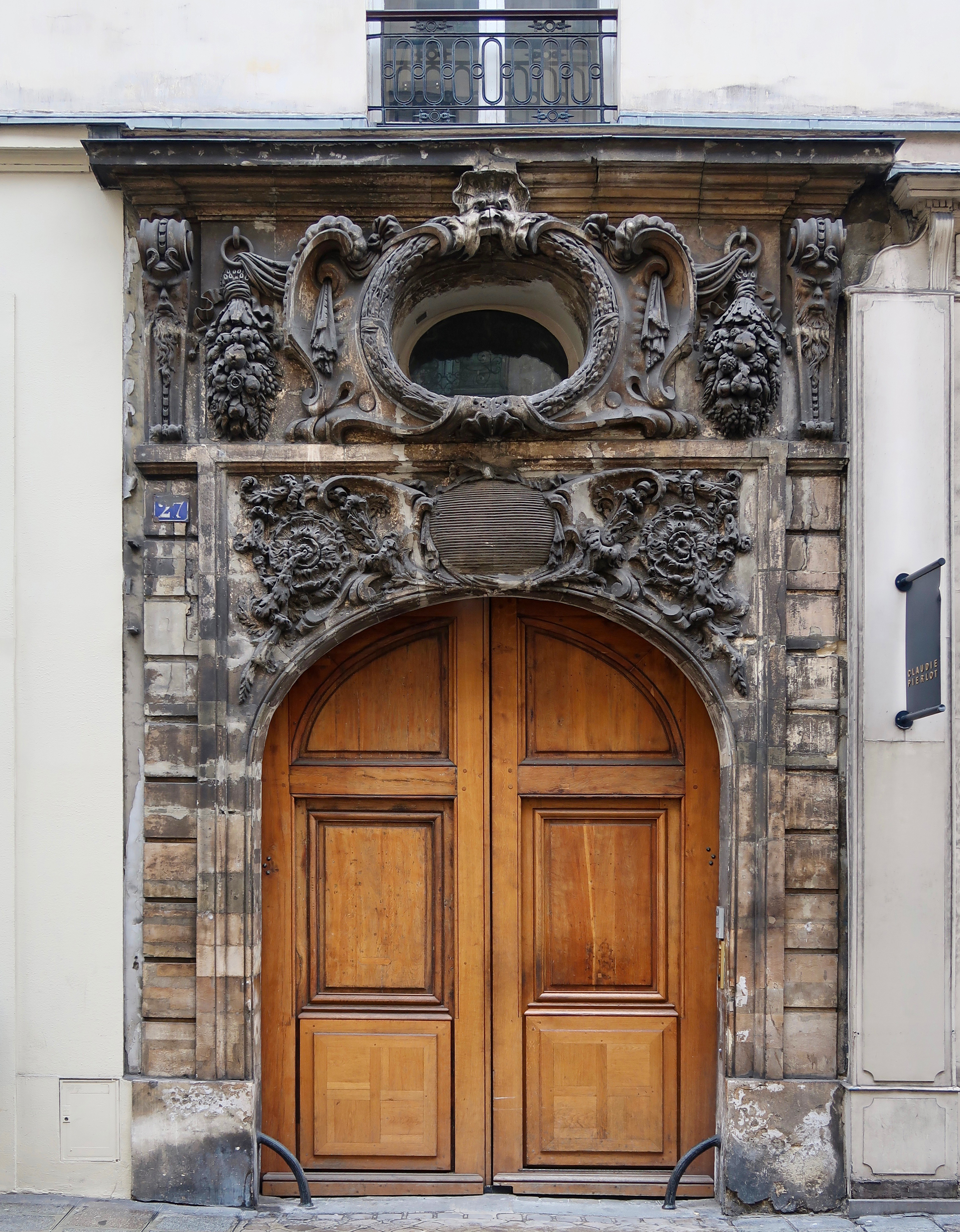
Door at no. 27

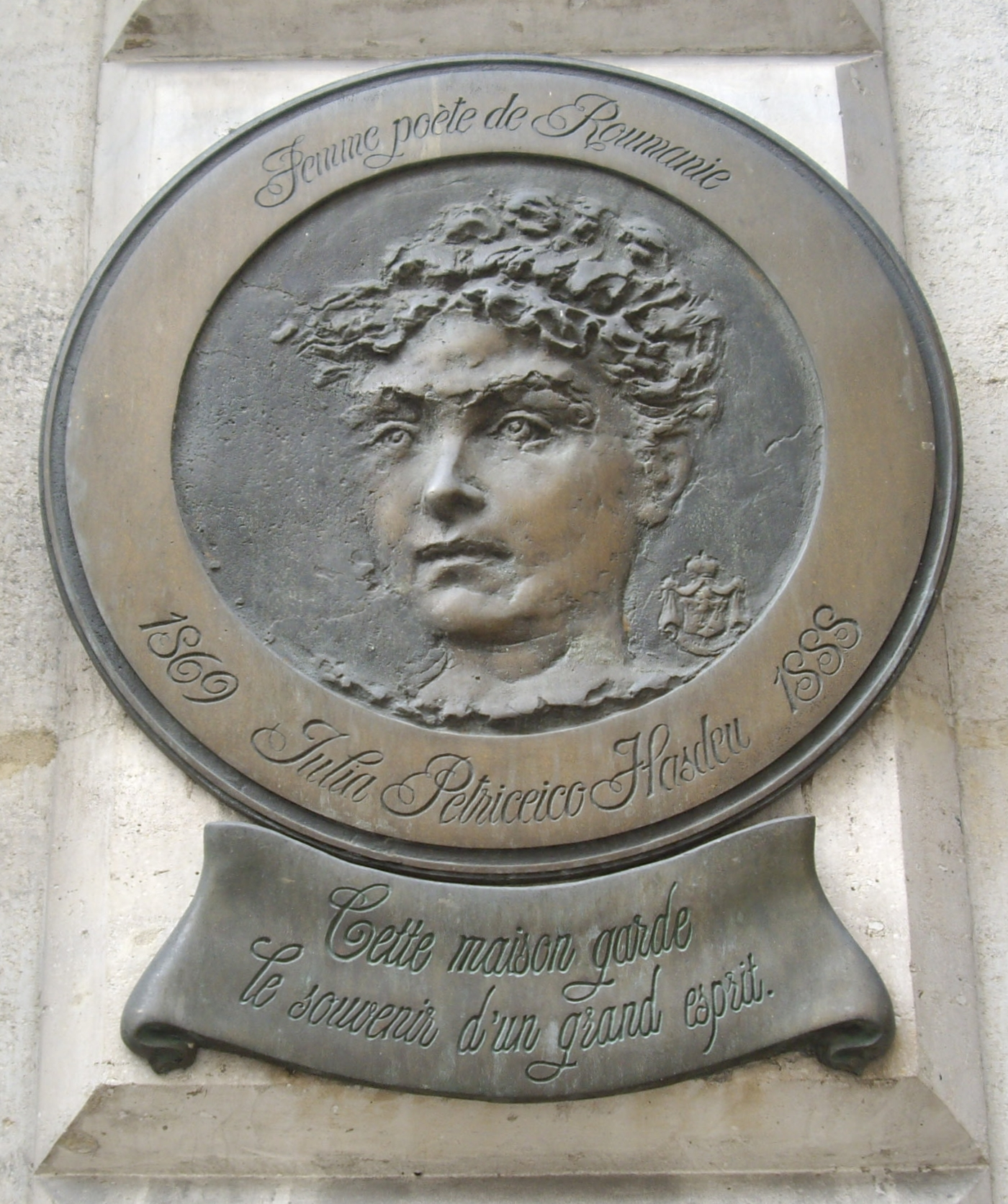
Plaque at no. 28

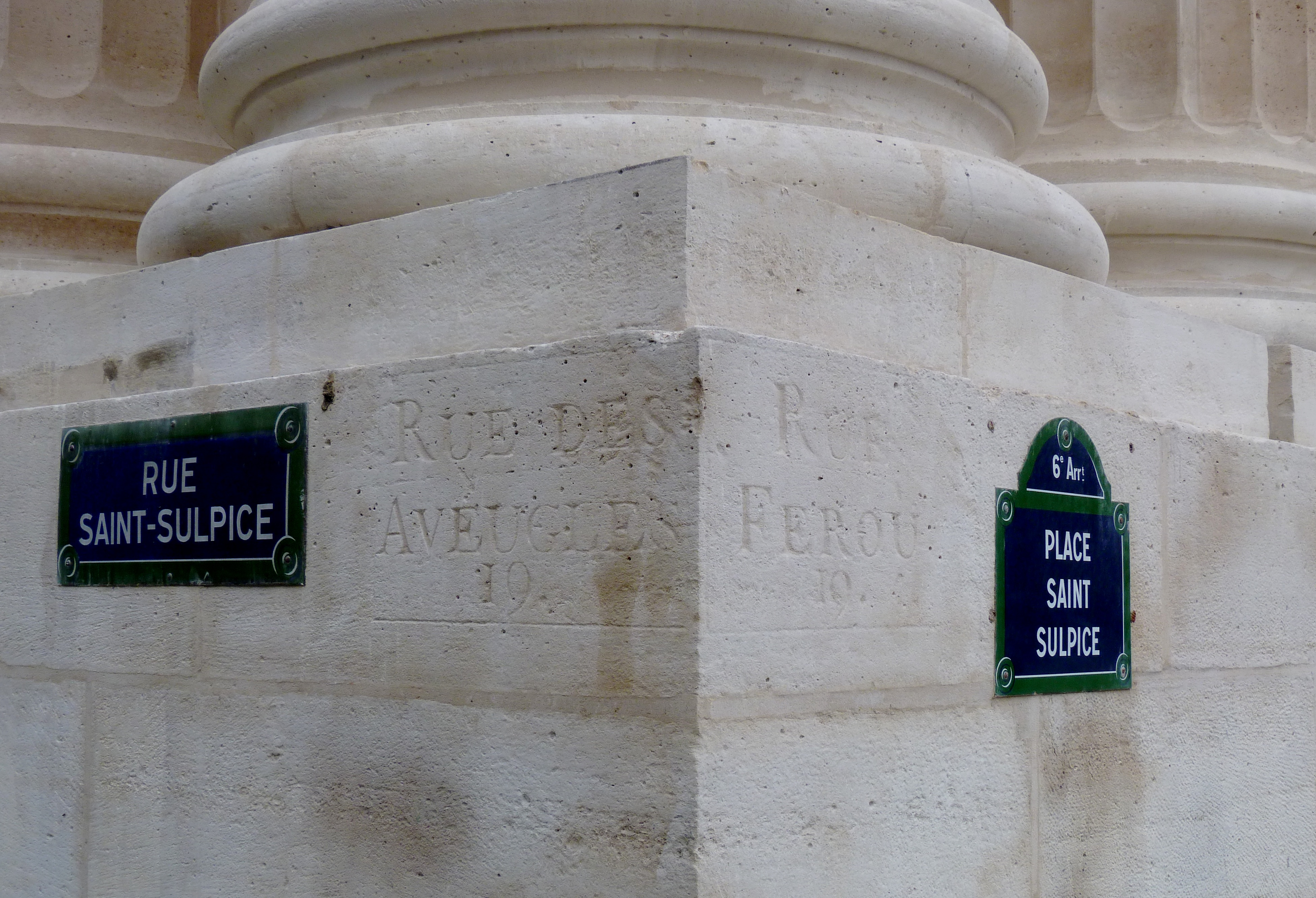
Former "Rue des Aveugles" marking on Saint-Sulpice Church

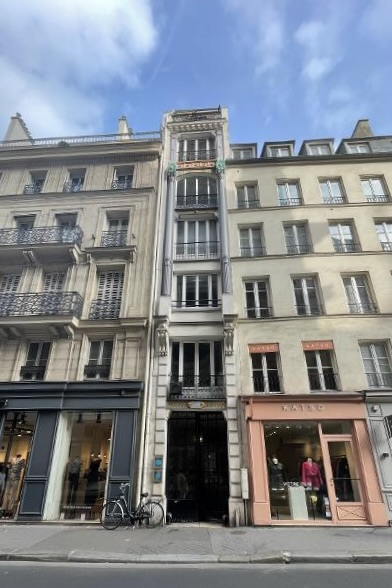
No. 36, former brothel
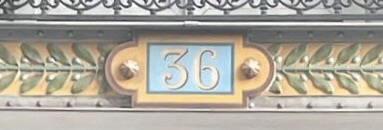
Distinctive brothel numbering at no. 36

== See also ==
- Saint-Sulpice Church
- Saint-Germain-des-Prés
- History of Paris
- Paris Métro
