= Jacques-Joseph Moreau =

French psychiatrist (1804–1884)

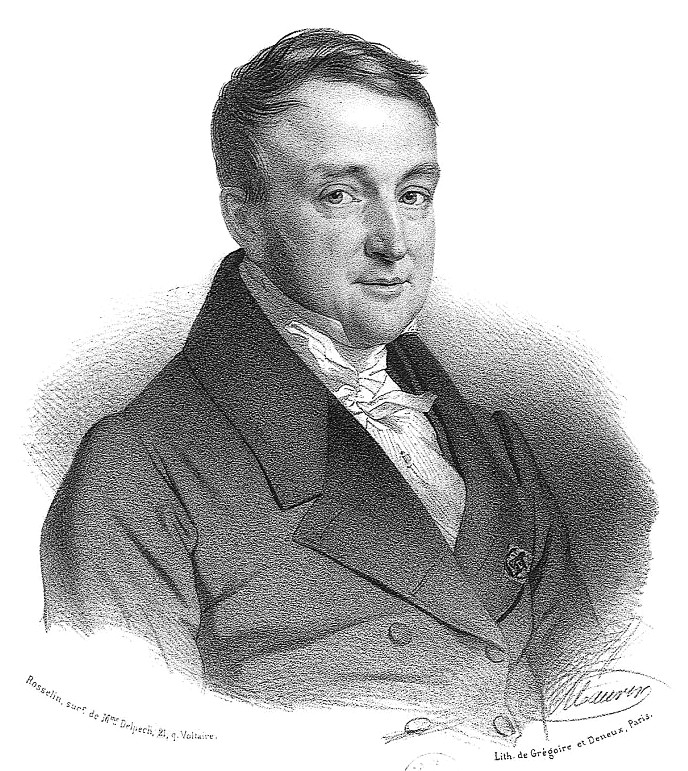
Jacques-Joseph Moreau

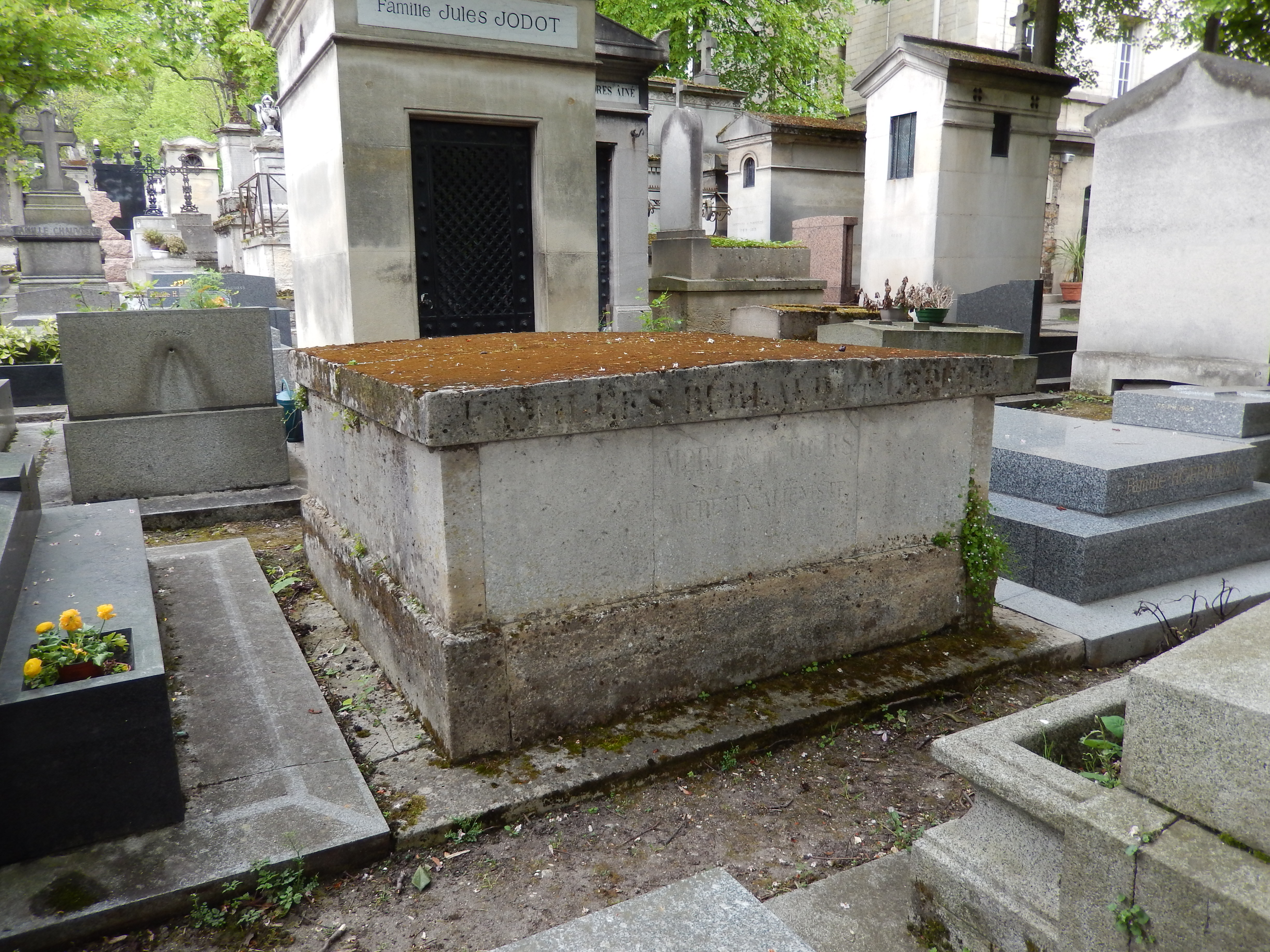
Moreau's grave at Père Lachaise Cemetery

Jacques-Joseph Moreau (3 June 1804 – 26 June 1884), nicknamed "Moreau de Tours", was a French psychiatrist and member of the Club des Hashischins. Moreau was the first physician to do systematic work on drugs' effects on the central nervous system, and to catalogue, analyze, and record his observations.

== Works ==
After a long trip (1836–1840) in the Orient, he discovered the effect of hashish. He studied it in order to understand the relation between madness and dreams, which are similar deliriums, according to Moreau.

He was the author of the 1845 Du Hachisch et de l'aliénation mentale, later translated into English and published as Hashish and Mental Illness. He was the first doctor to publish a work about a drug and its effect on the central nervous system.

"In an era which finally viewed the human psyche in a natural humanist terms rather than as the uncontrollable supernatural domain of demons and angels. Through careful observation of people's reactions, including his own, to hashish—particularly their openness to suggestions and willingness to consider new possibilities—Moreau theorized that psychoactive substances could treat or replicate mental illness in a way to help cure patients. His 1845 studies on datura and hashish were prepared as a treatise that documented both physical and mental benefits, and ultimately led to modern psychopharmacology and the use of numerous psychotomimetic drug treatments." ("Hemp for Health" Chris Conrad p 20)

Pierre Janet identified him as one of his predecessors who had recognized "the pathological role played by grief and emotion" in creating vulnerability to psychological problems.

In 1843 with Jules Baillarger (1809–1890), François Achille Longet (1811–1871) and Laurent Alexis Philibert Cerise (1807–1869), he founded the psychiatric journal Annales médico-psychologiques.
