= Club des Hashischins =

Parisian drug group

Coordinates: 48.8517°N 2.3592°E

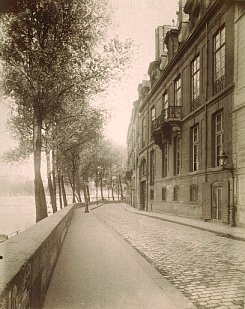
Hôtel de Lauzun, the club's meeting place

The Club des Hashischins (sometimes also spelled Club des Hashishins or Club des Hachichins, "Club of the Hashish-Eaters") was a Parisian group dedicated to the exploration of drug-induced experiences, notably with hashish. Members included Victor Hugo, Alexandre Dumas, Charles Baudelaire, Gérard de Nerval and Honoré de Balzac.

== Background ==
The Club was started as a research experiment. Unknown members included Charles Baudelaire's muse and lover Jeanne Duval (known as, Black Venus), the owner of the Hotel Lauzun (Pimodan) Jerome Pichon, Fernand Broissard who hosted the initial events in his room, and Louis-Remy Aubert Roche who worked with Jacques Joseph Moreau growing cannabis on the grounds of Bicetre Mental Asylum.

Several drugs like hashish and opium were increasingly well known in Europe by the beginning of the nineteenth century. At that time, recreational use of these drugs was widespread among scientific and literary circles.

The Armée d'Orient, along with a contingent of 151 scientists and anthropologists from the Commission des Sciences et des Arts, brought quantities of hashish home with them from Napoleon's expedition to Egypt. The French conquest of Algeria of 1830 to 1847 further increased the popular consumption of hashish.

== Members ==
- Dr. Jacques-Joseph Moreau
- Théophile Gautier
- Charles Baudelaire
- Alexandre Dumas
- Gérard de Nerval
- Eugène Delacroix

Occasional visitors included Honoré de Balzac, Gustave Flaubert and Victor Hugo.

== History ==
The club was active from about 1844 to 1849 and counted the literary and intellectual elite of Paris among its members, including Dr. Jacques-Joseph Moreau, Théophile Gautier, Charles Baudelaire, Gérard de Nerval, Eugène Delacroix and Alexandre Dumas. Monthly "séances" were held at the Hôtel de Lauzun (at that time Hôtel Pimodan) on the Île Saint-Louis.

Gautier wrote about the club in Revue des Deux Mondes in February 1846, where he described his first visit:

"One December evening, obeying a mysterious summons, drafted in enigmatic terms understood by affiliates but unintelligible for others, I arrived in a distant quarter, a sort of oasis of solitude in the middle of Paris that the river, surrounding it with its two arms, seems to defend against the encroachments of civilization. It was in an old house on the island of Saint-Louis, the Hotel Pimodan, built by Lauzun, that the bizarre club of which I was a member recently held its monthly sittings where I was to attend for the first time."

While he is often cited as the founder of the club, in the article Gautier says he was attending their séances for the first time that evening and made clear that others were sharing a familiar experience with him. The club members often consumed Dawamesc, a greenish paste made from cannabis resin mixed with fat, honey, and pistachios.

During this period Jacques-Joseph Moreau, who specialized in the sociological concept of social alienation, studied the effects of regularly consuming hashish. Moreau studied this product according to his travels between 1837 and 1840 in Egypt and Syria, and Asia Minor. Back in France, he continued to experiment on himself and published an 1845 book entitled Hashish and mental alienation in which he establishes an equivalence between dream, hallucination, and hashish delirium. This book was the first written by a scientist about a drug.

Gautier and Baudelaire eventually stopped attending the sessions. Gautier writes: "After a dozen experiments, we gave up forever this intoxicating drug, not that it hurt us physically, but the true writer needs only his natural dreams, and he does not like his thought to be influenced by any agent."
