= Société des bibliophiles français =

French learned society for bibliophiles

Society of French Bibliophiles
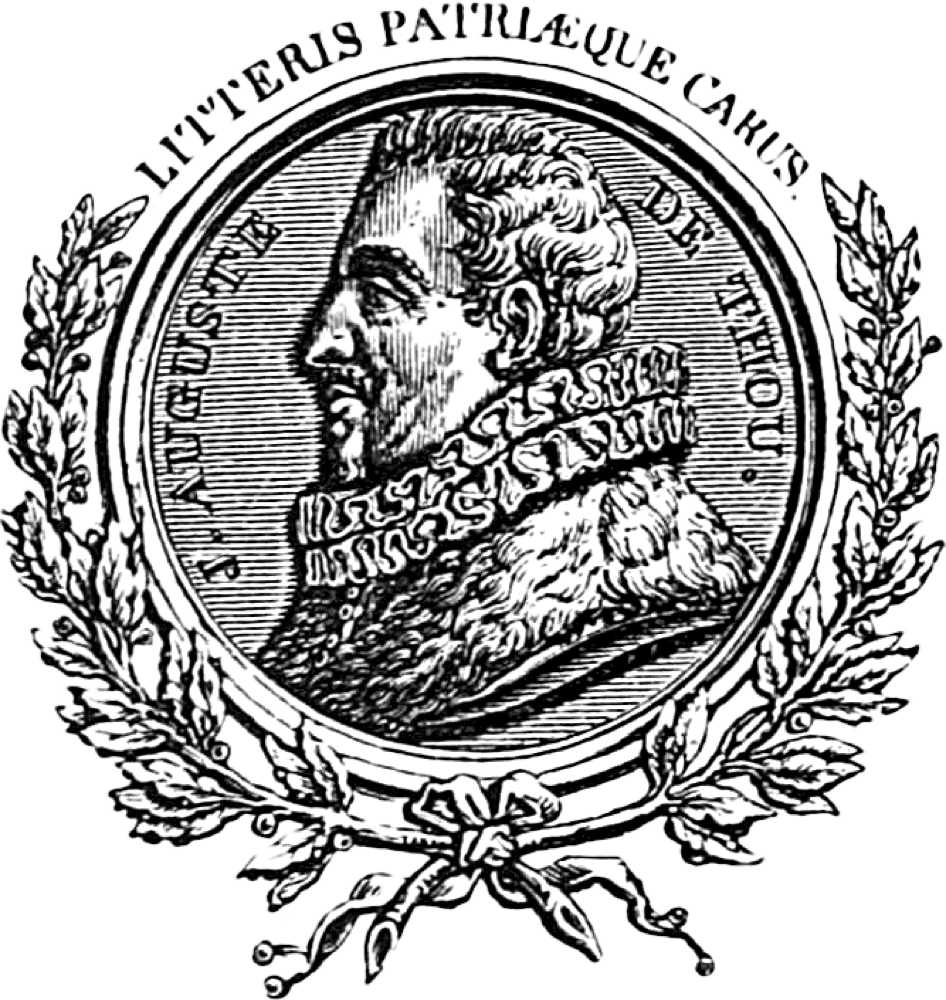
- Seal of the Société des bibliophiles français. (1861)
- Formation: 1 January 1820
- Founded at: France
- Type: Learned society
- Headquarters: Paris
- Members: 24
- Official language: French

The Société des bibliophiles français (English: Society of French Bibliophiles) was a learned society for French bibliophiles formed during the 1820s in Paris, France.

== History ==
The Society of French Bibliophiles was founded on 1 January 1820 in Paris, France. It aimed to publish previously unpublished historical or literary documents or, at the very least, rare works of significance to French history or ancient literature.

The society had an annual election for president and treasurer, with a maximum of 24 members, each paying 100 francs annually. Membership required a passion for books, ownership of a library, and adherence to statutes, including nomination by two members and approval by majority vote. The French Bibliophile Society met twice a month and held two large annual meetings, one in January and the other in May.

French bibliographer Jérôme Pichon, a member since 1843, became the president of the Society of French Bibliophiles in 1844.

== Publications ==
Between 1820 and 1838, the Société des Bibliophiles produced 88 works.
