= Jérôme Pichon =

French bibliographer (1812–1896)

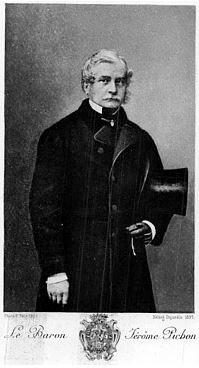
- Born: Jérome-Frédéric Pichon'; 3 December 1812; Paris
- Died: 26 August 1896 (aged 83); Paris
- Occupations: Bibliographer; Bibliophile; Art collector
- Spouse: Rosalie Clarmont

Baron Jérome-Frédéric Pichon (3 December 1812 – 26 August 1896) was a 19th-century French bibliographer and bibliophile. He was one of the most important French art collectors of his time.

== Biography ==
Jérôme Pichon was the second son of Alexandrine Émilie Brongniart (1780–1847), whose father was the architect Alexandre-Théodore Brongniart, and of Baron Louis-André Pichon.

After a brief stay at the École de Saint-Cyr, he studied law and was then appointed an auditor at the Conseil d’État before withdrawing completely from public life in 1846. He was also Consul General to Smyrna.

He began his collection of old books in 1831 and soon became indebted to booksellers for 6,000 francs, a sum that his father reimbursed without difficulty: the young man's love of books had turned into a devouring passion, which was to remain with him.

He also collected numerous antique objects of various natures (archaeology, numismatics, prints, silversmiths, etc.), including a rare collection of horse bits from Galiot de Genouillac, the king's great equerry, donated by his daughter to his successor in 1546 Claude Goufffier, lord of Oiron (Deux-Sèvres) and artefacts belonging to him. For more than 50 years, Pichon acquired one of the rarest books and manuscripts collections of his time, soon becoming president of the Société des bibliophiles français (SBF) in 1844, a society which he arbitrated efficiently, composing a number of bibliographic records intended for reissues, catalogues or publications and to the Bulletin des Bibliophiles.

He used to reside 17 quai d'Anjou in the former hôtel de Charles Gruÿn des Bordes, better known as Hôtel de Lauzun which he restored from collector's period items; moreover, he rented certain rooms to creators such as Baudelaire and Théophile Gautier and it was there that the famous meetings of the Club des Hashischins took place. The SBF had its headquarters there.

He maintained a long correspondence with Charles Nodier and Paul Lacroix.

Among other things, he is responsible for the publication of the Ménagier de Paris in 1846.

Married to Rosalie Clarmont, daughter of banker Jean-Charles Clarmont and Rosalie Favrin, he was the father of Étienne Pichon, who was sub-prefect of Vervins and who died in 1876.

His rich library was the subject of two public auctions, one during his lifetime on 19 April 1869, and the other after his death in 1897.

== Publications (selection) ==
- 1844: La vénerie
- 1846: Le ménagier de Paris : Traité de morale et d'économie domestique composé vers 1393.
- 1880: Vie de Charles-Henry, comte d'Hoym : ambassadeur de Saxe-Pologne en France et celebre amateur de, Livres 1694 à 1736. on Gallica
- 1892: Le viandier de Guillaume Tirel dit Taillevent on Gallica
- 1895: Documents pour servir à l'histoire des libraires de Paris, 1486-1600 on Archive.org

== Bibliography ==
- Vicaire, Georges (1896). Le Baron Jérome Pichon, président honoraire de la Sociétés [sic] des bibliophiles français, 1812-1896: Notice suivie de la bibliographie de ses travaux (PDF) (in French). Paris: Librairie Téchener.
- 1897: Paul Chevallier, Collections de feu M. le baron Jérome Pichon : catalogue des objets antiques, du Moyen Âge, de la renaissance, etc. dont la vente aura lieu a Paris, Hôtel Drouot, 24 avril - 1er mai, 1897
