= Hippocras =

Drink of spiced, sweetened wine

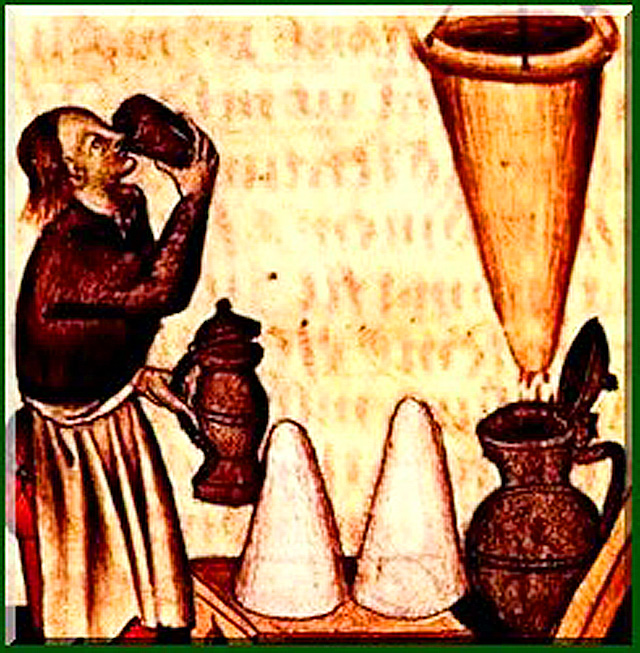
- Hippocrates's sleeve being used to make hippocras wine
- Type: Wine mixed with sugar and spices
- Origin: Roman Empire
- Ingredients: Wine, spices, sugar

Hippocras sometimes spelled hipocras or hypocras, is a drink made from wine mixed with sugar and spices, usually including cinnamon, and possibly heated. After being steeped in the sweetened wine for a day, the spices are strained out through a conical cloth filter bag called a manicum hippocraticum or Hippocratic sleeve (originally devised by the 5th century BC Greek physician Hippocrates to filter water), from which the name of the drink is derived.

== History ==
Spiced wine was popular in the Roman Empire, as recorded in the writings of Pliny the Elder and Apicius. In the 12th century a spiced wine named "pimen" or "piment" was mentioned by Chrétien de Troyes. During the 13th century the city of Montpellier had a reputation for trading spiced wines with England. The first recipes for spiced wine appeared at the end of the 13th century (recipes for red wine and piment found in the Tractatus de Modo) or at the beginning of the 14th century (recipe for piment in the Regimen sanitatis (Regiment de Sanitat) of Arnaldus de Villa Nova). Piment is also mentioned in The Miller's Tale by Geoffrey Chaucer. Since 1390, recipes for piment have also been called ipocras or ypocras (Forme of Cury in England, Ménagier de Paris or Viandier de Taillevent in France), probably with reference and tribute to Hippocrates. In the Catalan cookbook Llibre del Coch (1520) the recipe is given as pimentes de clareya. A honey sweetened variant of hippocras was known as clarry (Anglo-Norman: clarré, claré) and is mentioned in The Customs of London (16th c.) by Richard Arnold.

The drink became extremely popular, with a reputation as having various medicinal or even aphrodisiac properties.

In the 16th century, food was classified along two axes: cold or hot, dry or wet. People at that time believed in pursuing “balance” between these, for instance by stewing dry ingredients (like root vegetables) and roasting wet foods (like suckling pig). Wine was considered to be cold and dry, and so to this warm ingredients like sugar, ginger and cinnamon were added, creating hypocras.

Cookbooks and pharmacological manuals both provide recipes. This traditional recipe goes back to 1631:

Take 10 lb. best Red wine or White wine, 1½ oz. cinnamon, 2 scruples cloves, 4 scruples of each cardamom and grains of paradise (Aframomum melegueta), 3 drams ginger. Crush the spices coarsely and steep in the wine for 3 or 4 hours. Add 1½ lb. whitest sugar. Pass through the sleeve several times, and it is ready.

Since the 16th century, the word has been generally spelled hippocras or hipocras in English and hypocras in French. Original recipes for hippocras were made until the 19th century, when it fell out of favor. This wine is made with sugar and spices. Sugar then was considered to be medicine and the spices varied according to the recipes. The main spices are: cinnamon, ginger, clove, grains of paradise and long pepper. An English manuscript specifies that sugar was uniquely for the lords and honey was for the people. Since the 17th century, spiced wines, in France, have been generally prepared with fruits (apples, oranges, almonds) and with musk or ambergris. In England, in 1732, there was a recipe for red hippocras containing milk and brandy. The drink was well liked during medieval and Elizabethan times. Moreover, doctors prescribed it to aid digestion. It was served at most banquets all over Europe.

The drink was highly prized during the high and late Middle Ages. In France, it has been noted as the favorite drink of notorious baron Gilles de Rais (c. 1405 – 1440), who reportedly drank several bottles every day and had his victims drink it prior to assault. Later, King Louis XIV (r. 1643–1715) was also known to enjoy it. In those times, the drink was a highly valued gift-item, in the same vein as jam and fruit preserves. Hippocras fell out of fashion and was forgotten during the 18th century.

In France, hypocras is still produced in the Ariège and Haute Loire areas, though in very small quantities.

Since 1996 the population of Basel have revived the New Year's morning celebration of the so-called Aadringgede (a drinking cheer). The Dreizack-fountain in Freiestrasse is filled with hippocras, spelled Hypokras in the local Swiss-German dialect. In Basel it is a tradition in winter to drink Hypokras and eat Basler Läggerli (biscuits) with it.

The drink may have eventually inspired the Spaniards in their 18th-century development of sangria. While sweeter than hippocras, sangria is still often made with spices, including cinnamon, ginger, and pepper.

== See also ==
- Ancient Greece and wine
- Conditum
- Mulled wine
- Culinary Heritage of Switzerland
