= List of medieval cookbooks =

This is a list of cookbooks written in the Medieval Period (~5th-15th centuries), a cookbook being a culinary text that compiles recipes and instructions for preparing food.

== By language ==
=== Arabic ===
Name	Native name	Author	Region of origin	Time period of writing	# of recipes compiled	Description
Kitab al-Tabikh	Arabic: كتاب الطبيخ, romanized: Kitāb al-Ṭabīḫ, lit. 'Book of dishes'	Ibrahim ibn al-Mahdi		779-839 (lifetime of the author)	at least 40	No publicly available surviving manuscripts exist, a privately-owned extant manuscript is believed to exist. The book is referenced in Ibn-Sayyar's kitab al-tabikh 40 recipes have survived through references in other texts. Possibly the first Arabic-language cookbook.
Kitab al-Tabikh	Arabic: كتاب الطبيخ, romanized: Kitāb al-Ṭabīḫ, lit. 'Book of dishes'	Ibn Sayyar al-Warraq	Baghdad	10th-century	600+	Earliest surviving Arabic-language cookbook, translated into English in 2007 by Nawal Nasrallah
Kitab al-tabikh	Arabic: كتاب الطبخ في المغرب والأندلس في عصر الموحدين, romanized: Kitāb al-Ṭabikh fī al-Maghrib wa al-Andalus fī ʽAṣr al-Muwaḥḥidīn, lit. 'The book of cooking in Maghreb and Al-Andalus in the era of the Almohads'	Anonymous	Al-Andalus	13th-century	462	Oldest known cookbook from the Iberian Peninsula
Kitab al-Wuslah ila l-habib	Arabic: الوصلة إلى الحبيب في وصف الطيبات والطيب, romanized: al-Wuṣla ilā ‘l-ḥabīb fī Waṣf al-ṭayyibāt wa ‘l-ṭīb, lit. 'Reaching the Beloved through the Description of Delicious Foods and Flavourings'	Anonymous, thought to be Ibn al-Adim	Aleppo	13th-century	635	It was translated to English by Charles Perry.
Kitab fadalat al-khiwan	Arabic: فضالة الخوان في طيبات الطعام والألوان, romanized: Faḍālat al-khiwān fī ṭayyibāt al-ṭaʿām wa ‘l-alwān, lit. 'Best of Delectable Foods and Dishes from al-Andalus and al-Maghrib'	Ibn Razīn al-Tujībī	Al-Andalus	1239–1265	480	An English translation containing 480 recipes was published in 2024 by Daniel Newman
Kanz al-fawa'id fi tanwi' al-mawa'id	Arabic: كنز الفوائد في تنويع الموائد, romanized: Kanz al-fawāʾid fī tanwīʿ al-mawāʾid, lit. 'Treasure Trove of Benefits and Variety at the Table'	Anonymous	Egypt	14th-century	829	It was translated to English by Nawal Nasrallah. Contains 829 recipes organized into 23 chapters Many copies of the initial manuscript exist, some of the contain errors made by scribes. Contains several recipes that were copied verbaitim from Ibn-Sayyar's kitab al-tabikh.
Kitab Wasf	Arabic: كتاب وصف الأطعمة المعتادة, romanized: Kitab Waṣf al-Aṭʿima al-Muʿtada, lit. 'The Book of the Description of Familiar Foods'	Anonymous	Egypt	14th-century	480	Translated to English by Charles Perry in 2001 under the name Medieval Arab Cookery Copied much of Baghdadi's kitab al-Tabikh and adds 240 new recipes.
Kitab al-Tabikh	Arabic: كتاب الطبيخ, romanized: Kitāb al-Ṭabīḫ, lit. 'Book of dishes'	Muhammad bin Hasan al-Baghdadi	Baghdad	1226	160	Translated into English by A.J. Arberry in 1939 and later again by Charles Perry in 2005.
Zahr al-hadiqa fi ' l-at'ima al-aniqa'	Arabic: زهر الحديقة في الأطعمة الأنيقة, romanized: Zahr al-ḥadīqa fi ‘l-aṭʿima al-anīqa, lit. 'flowers in the garden of elegant foods'	Ibn Mubārak Shāh	Egypt	15th-century	332	Translated into English by Daniel Newman in 2020.
Kitab al-tibakha	Arabic: كتاب الطباخة, romanized: Kitāb al-ṭibākha, lit. 'The book of cookery'	Al-Mubarrad	Damascus	15th-century	44	Discovered and edited by Habib Zayyat in 1937.

=== Chinese ===
Name	Author	Region of origin	Time period of writing	Description
Wushi Zhongkuilu	"Mrs. Wu"	Eastern China	1st half of the 13th-century	

=== Danish ===
Name	Author	Region of origin	Time period of writing	Description
Libellus de arte coquinaria	Anonymous		13th-century	

=== English ===
Name	Author	Region of origin	Time period of writing	Description
The Forme of Cury	The master cooks of Richard II of England	England	14th-century	Contains around 205 recipes. Written in middle English. In 2008, it was scanned and made freely available online by the John Rylands Research Institute and Library.
Utilis Coquinario	Anonymous		Late 14th-century	
Diversa Cibaria			14th-century	Translated from Anglo-Norman recipe collections.
Liber Cure Cocorum	Anonymous	Lancashire	~1430	Written in Northern English dialects of the 15th century.

=== French ===
Name	Author	Region of origin	Time period of writing	Description
Le Viandier	Guillaume Tirel		15th-century	

=== German ===
Name	Author	Region of origin	Time period of writing	Description
Das Buoch von guoter Spise	Michael de Leone	Würzburg	1350	Oldest surviving German language-cookbook, contained more than 100 recipes.
Kochbuch	Meister Hans	Württemberg	1460	It is a compilation of older recipes.

=== Latin ===
Name	Author	Region of origin	Time period of writing	Description
Tacuinum Sanitatis	Anonymous		11th-century	Translation of an Arabic medical treatise that contained recipes for medicinal dishes
Liber de Coquina	Anonymous		14th-century	
Liber de ferculis	Jambobinus	Venice	13th-century	The book was a translation of 82 Arabic recipes.
Apicius	Possibly, Marcus Gavius Apicius		1st century	
De honesta voluptate et valetudine	Bartolomeo Platina	Venice	1474	The first ever printed cookbook, many of the recipes were copied from the earlier Libro de Arte Coquinaria by Martino da Como
Libro de Arte Coquinaria	Martino da Como	Lombardy	15th-century	First ever Italian cookbook.

=== Persian ===
Name	Author	Region of origin	Time period of writing	Description
Nimatnama		Malwa Sultanate	Ordered by Ghiyath Shah during his rule (1469 to 1500)	Translated to English by Norah Titley.

=== Turkish ===
Name	Author	Region of origin	Time period of writing	Description
Kitabü t-Tabih	Muhammad bin Mahmud Shirvani	Ottoman Empire	15th century	First Turkish language cookbook, it is a translation of Baghdadi's 13th century Kitab al-Tabikh with 60 added recipes and changes made to some of Baghdadi's recipes.

== See also ==
- Category:Medieval cookbooks
- List of anonymously published works
- Lists of books
- List of cookbook writers
- List of sources of Chinese culinary history
- Glossary of historical culinary terms
- Medieval literature – Literary works of the Middle Ages
