= Dariole =

French culinary mold

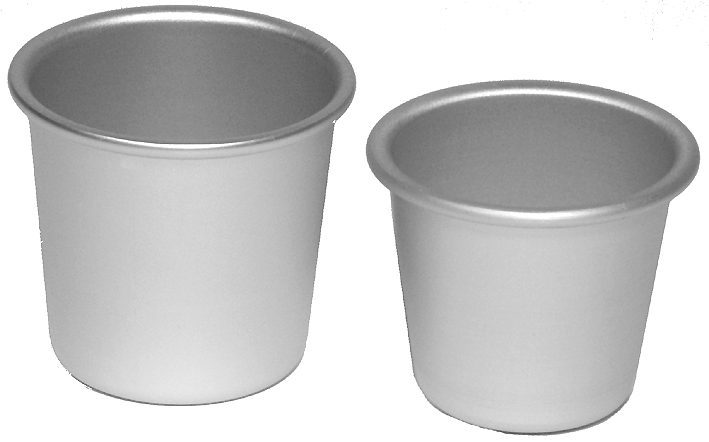
- Two dariole molds
- Course: Dessert
- Place of origin: France
- Region or state: Provence
- Main ingredients: Puff pastry, egg custard
- Variations: Liquor-laced frangipane

Dariole is a French term for a small culinary mold in the shape of a truncated cone. The word also refers to the dessert that is baked in the mold. Classically, the dessert is an egg-custard filled puff pastry. In the Middle Ages, they sometimes included fruit, cheese, bone marrow or fish inside the pastry.

An early 20th century recipe replaced the traditional custard with liquor-laced frangipane. Today there are also savory darioles, usually made with vegetable custards.

== History ==
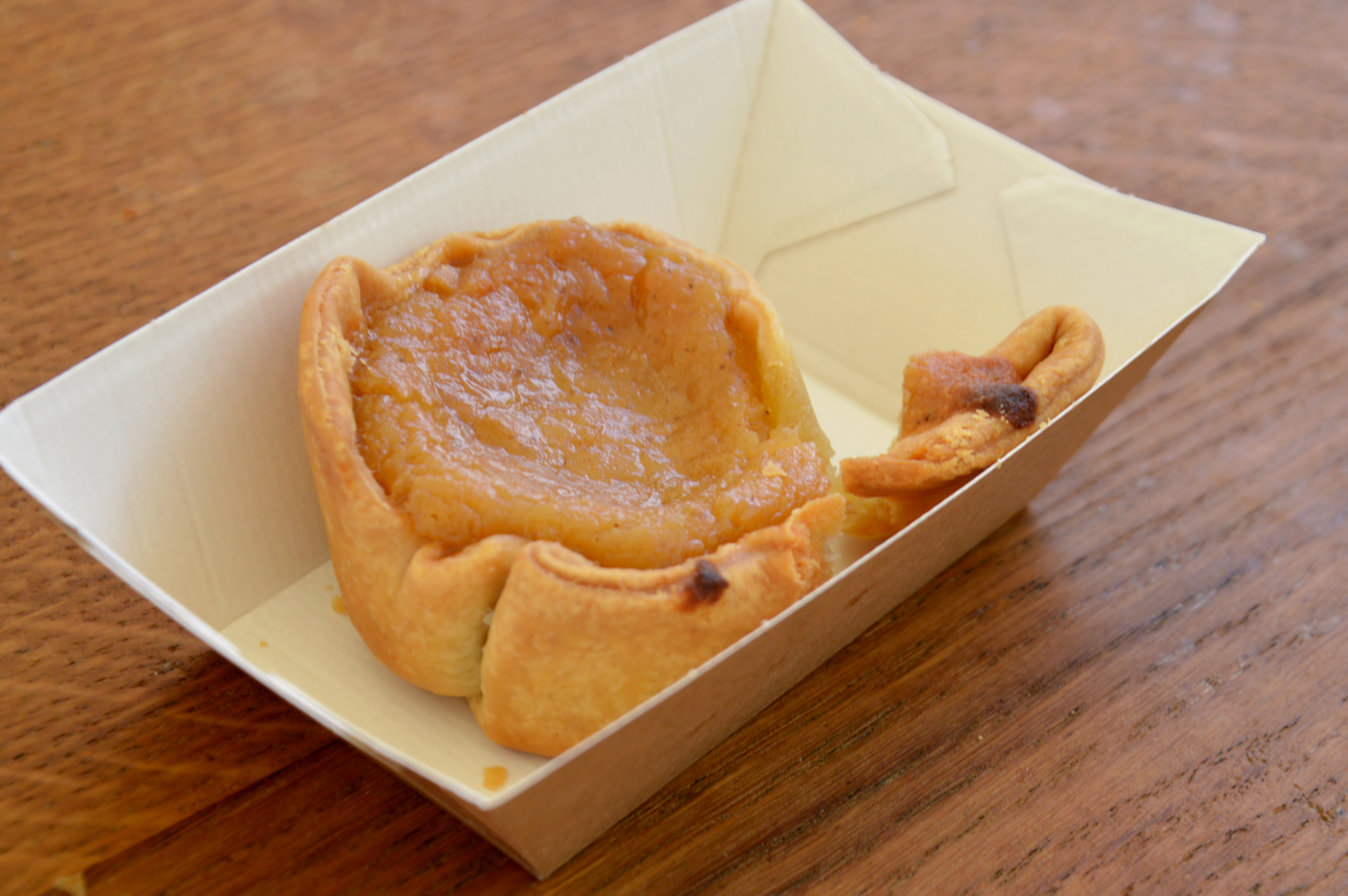
A dariole made according to a 15th-century recipe.

According to the fourteenth-century household book Le Ménagier de Paris, which does not include a recipe for the dessert, darioles were served at weddings. Recipes from later English records and the 1486 edition of Le Viandier are unclear. A 15th century provençal recipe for a large custard tart called dariola is known. By the 18th-century, the dessert had taken the form of a small custard tart with fluted sides. In late 19th-century recipes, the custard is elaborately flavored and scented with citron, orange flower water, and vanilla sugar. The recipe from Larousse gastronomique filled the pastry with liquor-laced frangipane instead of custard.

== See also ==
- Glossary of historical culinary terms
- List of almond dishes
- List of French desserts
