= Chewit =

Chewit may refer to:

- Scratching
- A brand of square fruit-flavoured sweet: Chewits
- A pastry dish eaten in England in the late Middle Ages and Early Modern Period: Chewette
- The northern lapwing
