= Samuel Pegge =

English antiquary and clergyman (1704–1796)

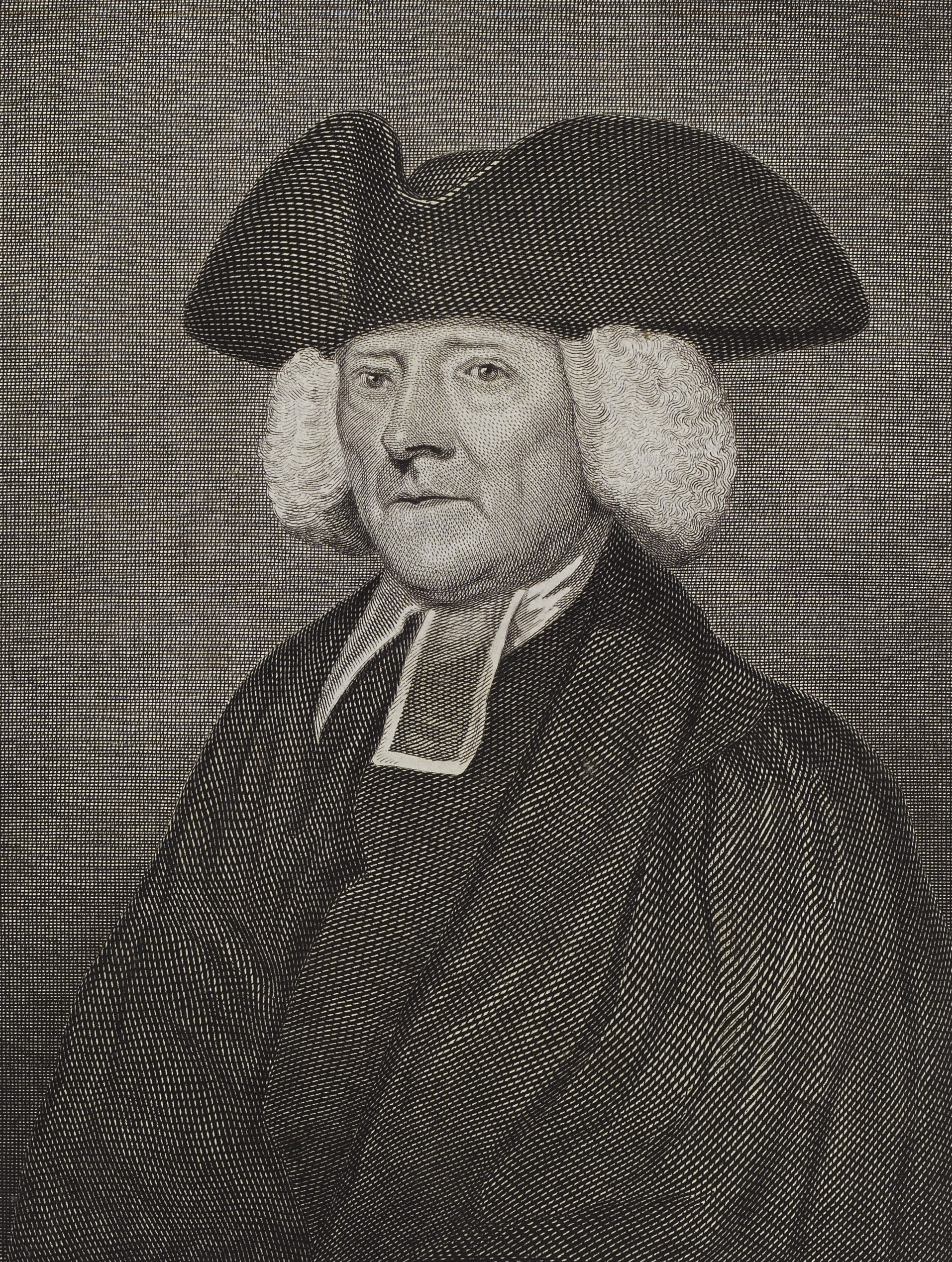
- Born: 5 November 1704; Chesterfield, Derbyshire, England
- Died: 14 February 1796 (aged 91)
- Education: Chesterfield
- Occupations: Vicar and antiquarian
- Spouse: Anne Clarke
- Children: Three
- Parent(s): Christopher and Gertrude Pegge

Samuel Pegge "the Elder" (5 November 1704 – 14 February 1796) was an English antiquary and clergyman.

Born at Chesterfield, Derbyshire, he was the son of Christopher Pegge and his wife Gertrude, daughter of Francis Stephenson of Unstone, near Chesterfield. Christopher Pegge (died 1723) belonged to a family that had lived for several generations at Osmaston, near Ashbourne, Derbyshire, was a woollen dealer in Derby and later a lead merchant in Chesterfield. Samuel's father was Mayor of Chesterfield three times. Samuel published an important study on the Roman roads of Derbyshire as well as notes which his son, also Samuel, continued on the subject of Derbyshire words and phrases.

== Education ==
Samuel Pegge was educated at Chesterfield and he became a pensioner and scholar of St. John's College, Cambridge, in 1722. He graduated B.A. 1725, M.A. 1729. He was elected to a lay fellowship on the Beresford foundation of his college on 21 March 1726, but was removed in favour of Michael Burton (afterwards vice-master of St. John's), who claimed founder's kin. Pegge was then made an honorary fellow, and in 1729 was elected a "Platt" fellow of St. John's. In 1730 he was elected a member of the Spalding Society, to which he contributed some papers, and from 1730 to 1732 belonged to the Zodiac Club, a college literary society consisting of twelve members denominated by the signs of the zodiac. Pegge was the original Mars.

== Vicar and antiquary ==
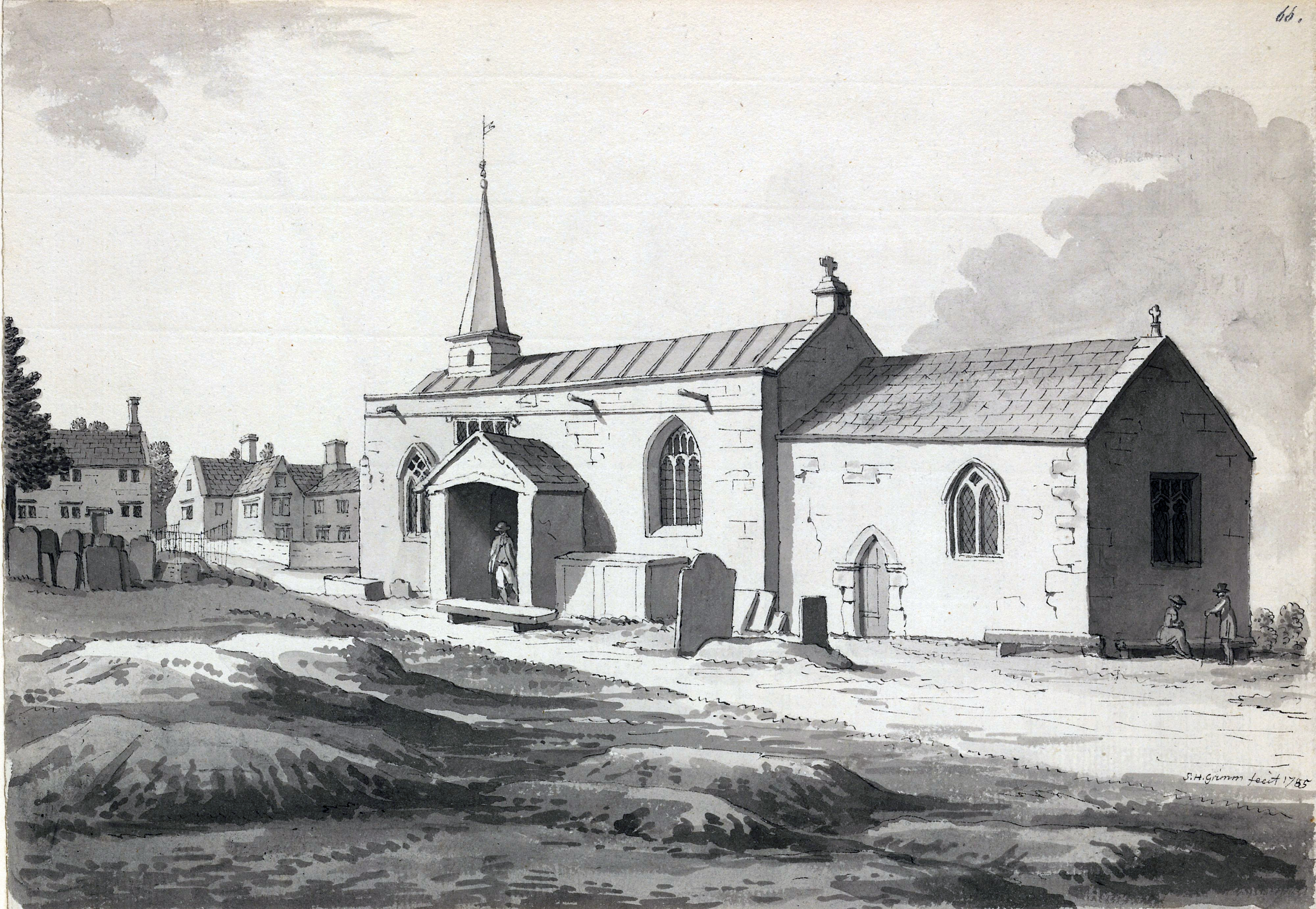
Samuel Pegge's church in Old Whittington, as it was in 1785, and as drawn by Samuel Hieronymus Grimm. This church was destroyed by a fire.

Pegge was ordained in 1729, and in 1730 became curate to Dr. John Lynch at Sundridge in Kent. On 6 December 1731 he became the vicar of Godmersham, Kent, where he lived for about twenty years, writing on antiquities and collecting books and coins. From 1749 to 1751 he lived at Surrenden, again in Kent, as tutor to the son of Sir Edward Dering. In 1751 he was elected fellow of the Society of Antiquaries, and in the same year was inducted into the rectory of Old Whittington, near Chesterfield, exchanging Godmersham for the rectory of Brinhill (or Brindle), Lancashire. On 22 October 1758 he exchanged Brinhill for the vicarage of Heath, near Whittington, holding Heath together with Whittington until his death.

In 1765 he was presented to the perpetual curacy of Wingerworth, near Whittington. He was a prebendary of Lichfield (1757–1796), and in 1772 was collated to a stall in Lincoln Cathedral. In 1791 he was created LL.D. by the University of Oxford. He died, after a fortnight's illness, on 14 February 1796 at the age of 92. He was buried in the chancel at Whittington, where a mural tablet was installed. His small collection of English coins and medals were sold by auction on 23 March 1797.

== Family ==
The Pegge coat of arms. The Pegge family are originally from Shirley, Ashbourne. A distant relative is Catherine Pegge, a mistress of Charles II of England.

On 13 April 1732, Pegge married Anne (d. July 1746), daughter of Benjamin Clarke of Stanley, near Wakefield, Yorkshire, and they had three children: Christopher (died in infancy), Samuel (the younger) and Anna Katharine, wife of the Rev. John Bourne of Spital, near Chesterfield. A portrait of Pegge, drawn by Gustavus Brander, and engraved by James Basire, is prefixed to Pegge's Forme of Cury (see illustration above); however, there was an oil painting of him (reputed a better likeness) by Elias Needham.

== Contributions ==
Pegge contributed to the first ten volumes of the Archaeologia memoirs on a great variety of topics, such as Anglo-Saxon jewellery; the introduction of the vine into Britain; the stylus: King Alfred; the bull-running at Tutbury; the horn as a charter or instrument of conveyance; shoeing horses among the ancients; cock-fighting; the right of sanctuary; the manner of King John's death; Kit's Coty House; the commencement of day among the Saxons and Britons; "the mistaken opinion that Ireland and the Isle of Thanet are void of Serpents and prehistoric remains generally". He wrote seven memoirs in the Bibliotheca Topographica Britannica, including The Story of Guy, Earl of Warwick (1783); The History of Eccleshall Manor (1784); The Roman Roads of Derbyshire (1784); The Textus Roffensis (1784); History of Bolsover and Peak Castles, Derbyshire (1783). He also wrote a large number of articles for The Gentleman's Magazine from 1746 to 1795, signing himself "Paul Gemsege"—an anagram of Samuel Pegge), T. Row ( = The Rector Of Whittington), and "L. E." ( = [Samue]L [Pegg]E). While vicar of Godmersham Pegge made collections relating to Kent, including a Monasticon Cantianum in two folio manuscript volumes, and an account of the antiquities of Wye. He compiled a manuscript Lexicon Xenophonticum, and possessed various lexicons annotated by himself, as well as two volumes of collections in English history.

== Published works ==
1. A Series of Dissertations on some elegant and valuable Anglo-Saxon Remains (chiefly coins), London, 1756.
2. Memoirs of the Life of Roger de Weseham – Bishop of Coventry and Lichfield, London, 1761.
3. An Essay on the Coins of Cunobelin, London, 1766. Evans (Coins of the Ancient Britons, p. 7 t cf. p. 342) approved of Pegge's division of the coins, but not of the descriptions of the types.
4. An Assemblage of Coins fabricated by authority of the Archbishops of Canterbury, London, 1772.
5. FitzStephen's Description of London (translated from the Latin), 1772.
6. Evelyn's Fumifugium, edited by S. P., 1772.
7. Forme of Cury : a Roll of ancient English Cookery, London, 1780; published from a manuscript belonging to Gustavus Brander.
8. Annales Elise de Trickingham, &c., ed. by S. P., 1789.
9. The Life of Robert Grosseteste Bishop of Lincoln, London, 1793 (Pegge's principal work).
10. An Historical Account of Beauchief Abbey (Derbyshire), ed. by J. Nichols, London, 1801, the printing of which was largely supervised by Pegge's son Samuel.
11. Anonymiana, or Ten Centuries of Observations, 1809; also 1818.
12. An Alphabet of Kenticisms, printed in "Cleveland Words" &c. (English Dialect Society), 1876. (Nos. 10-12 were posthumous.)
13. A Disquisition on the Lows or Barrows in the Peak of Derbyshire, Particularly that capital of British Monuments called Arbelows Archaeologia 7: 131-148 1785
14. Illustrations of some Druidical remains from the Peak of Derbyshire drawn by Hayman Rooke Archaeologia 7: 19-24 1785
15. Observations by the Rev. M Pegge on the Stanton Moor Urns and Drudical Temple Archaeologia 8: 58-61 1787
16. Observations on an ancient font at Burnham Deepdale, in Norfolk Society of Antiquaries, 18 November 1790.
