= Kitab al-Wuslah ila l-habib =

13th-century Syrian cookbook

- Author: Unknown, possibly Ibn al-Adim
- Language: Arabic

Kitab al-Wuslah ila l-habib (Arabic: الوصلة إلی الحبیب في وصف الطیّبات و الطیب, lit. 'Winning the Beloved’s Heart With Delectable Dishes and Perfumes') is a Syrian cookbook from the 13th century. It contains 635 recipes and was authored or compiled by an anonymous author who, in some cases, is identified as the historian Ibn al-Adim from Aleppo. The book provides a picture of what people ate in the Middle East over 700 years ago and is one of the earliest known examples of cookbooks.

== Origin ==
Several hand-written copies of the book were found in the Levant and Iraq, one scroll was attributed to Ibn al-Adim, with another in Mosul attributed to "al-Jazzar". Of 5 known cookery manuals from 13th-century Syria, all of which were copied by scribes, Kitab al-Wuslah is believed to have been the most widespread. At least 10 handwritten copies are known to exist. Historian Maxime Rodinson concluded that the author was likely Syrian as evident by the abundance of Syrian dishes in the book.

The book contains a recipe attributed to the authors uncle, Ayyubid Emir Al-Ashraf Musa ibn Adil, which suggests that the author may have been a member of the Ayyubid dynasty. Rodinson commented that the book is more representative of Haute cuisine than Baghdadi's cookbook, as it contained more complex recipes. This can be seen as an indication that the author may have been an aristocrat.

== Contents ==
The book contained many recipes that are believed to have influenced modern-day dishes:

- One of the first known recipes for hummus.
- A recipe for a dish very similar to modern-day Syrian makdous.
- A recipe resembling modern-day Egyptian hawawshi.
- A recipe describing minced meat spread on thin dough and baked in a brick oven (furn), which is identified by historian Nawal Nasrallah as possibly the earliest recipe for lahmacun.
- The oldest mention of kleicha, according to historian Nawal Nasrallah.
- 4 recipes for couscous, 2 of which are possibly adapted to Syrian cuisine, with 2 others being described as "Maghrebi".
- Wusla and the 13th-century kitab al-tabikh contained the earliest known recipes for pilaf.

The book contained 75 recipes containing chicken, most of which instruct the cook to use sugar, the book contains no recipes that require the use of fresh fish, which is attributed to it being written in a landlocked region. Some of the recipes call for salt-preserved lemons, but do not provide a recipe for said lemons as they were considered so common a recipe is not needed.

Some of the recipes in the book overlap with other Arabic cookbooks from the same period as some of the shared recipes may have been copied from Avicenna's The Canon of Medicine and Ibn Jazla's Minhaj al-Bayan, though some of the medicinal advice has been omitted. Aside from cooking recipes, the book also contains recipes for perfumes.

All of the manuscripts found had a section added to the book containing recipes not found in the original text, often for sweets.

== Manuscripts ==
10 known manuscripts exist, which are named and scattered geographically:

1. Al-Ahmadiyya: Located in Aleppo, Syria.
2. Al-Zahiriyah: Located in Damascus, Syria, in the Zahiriyya Library, the library classifies it as written in the 9th or 10th centuries in the Hijri calendar.
3. The British Museum: Located in London, UK.
4. Istanbul: Located in the Ahmed III Library, Turkey.
5. Berlin: Located in Germany, it contains 5 pages and ascribes the book to Ibn al-Adim in the first page. It is thought to have been copied in year 1000 AH (1591/1592 CE).
6. Patna: Located in India.
7. Bankipore: Located in India, stored in the Khuda Bakhsh Oriental Library.
8. Cairo: Located in Egypt.
9. Mosul: Located in Iraq and credited to Abu al-Hussein ibn al-Jazzar (Jamāl al-Dīn Yaḥyā ibn al-ʿAẓīm al-Jazzār); a 13th century Egyptian poet.
10. Hussein Chelebi: Located in Bursa, Turkey.

== Editions ==
- In 1950, Maxime Rodinson published a study titled Récherches sur les manuscrits Arabes relatifs à la cuisine which contained a list of recipes and descriptions of the recipes, but only fully translated 9 recipes.
- In 1986, the University of Aleppo released an Arabic-language edition in print form, which was attributed to Ibn al-Adim. It was edited by Sulaymā Maḥjūb and Durriyya al-Khaṭīb.
- In 2017, the book was translated into English by Charles Perry. Perry noted that the recipes shifted from instructions given in second-person narration to descriptions given in third-person, which suggests that the recipes where read out loud to the cooks.

== See also ==
- Kitāb al-Ṭabīkh, 10th-century Arabic cookbook
- Kitāb al-ṭabīẖ, 13th-century Arabic cookbook
- Muhammad bin Hasan al-Baghdadi, medieval Arabic-language cookbook author
- List of medieval cookbooks
