= Chewette =

Early English pie

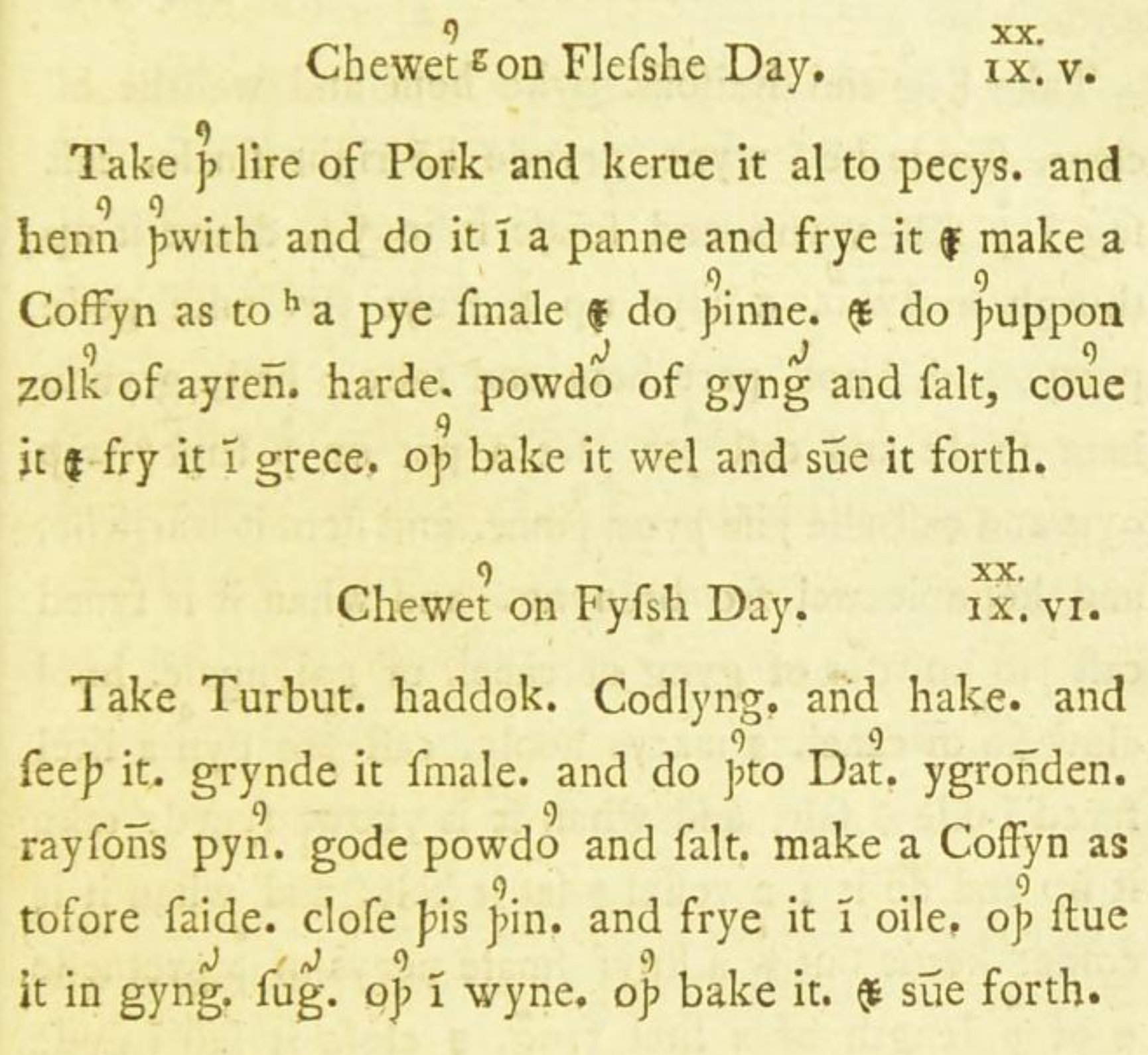
Recipes for chewettes in The Forme of Cury, 1780 edition.

Chewettes were small pastry items that were eaten in England from the late 14th to the beginning of the 17th centuries, described in various sources as pies, pastries and tarts. Contents varied widely, including boiled eggs and ginger, spiced, minced meat on days that did not require fasting, and fish such as hake and haddock on the days that did. At various times, they were baked, boiled and fried—the only element that remained consistent was an external pastry crust.

Chewettes were known under several spellings, including chewete, chewet, chawette, chuette, chuet, chuett, and chewit. The word's etymology is contested, although multiple philologists agree a French origin is likely. Chewettes were one of several similar dishes eaten across the middle of the second millennium, and have been likened to the whist pie of Lancashire which continues to be eaten.

== Preparation and serving ==
Across various sources, chewettes are described as small pies, tarts, and pastries. With contents and methods of cooking varying dramatically across recipes, the only consistent element across preparations was the presence of an external crust.

The contents of chewettes varied with the religious requirements of the day, and with what cooks had at hand. On non-fasting days, chewettes were made by filling pastry with spiced, minced meat, including poultry, pork or veal, while on fasting days, fish such as codling, haddock, hake or turbot were included. Cooks did not limit themselves to the flesh of the animal, using liver and marrow bones in some recipes. Non-meat fillings included ginger and hard-boiled eggs, and in later chewettes, sweet ingredients including dried fruits. In different preparations, chewettes were baked, boiled or fried, and included or excluded a pie crust on top.

The last descriptions of chewettes come from the Stuart Restoration, in the late 17th century. In the last feasts in which they were served, chewettes were filled with bone-marrow, and were set in the gaps between the largest, most valued dishes. Small dishes placed in such a fashion later became known as hors d'oeuvres. As they faded from feasts, the place of chewettes was taken by croquettes.

== Name ==
Chewettes were known under a number of names over the centuries, including chewet, chawette, chuette, chuet, chuett, and chewit. The Oxford English Dictionary describes the name's etymology as unclear, and a derivation from the word chew unlikely; an explanation Ken Albala endorses given the chewette's small size, allowing it to be eaten in a single mouthful.

Ernest Weekley, the British philologist, proposed that chewet may derive from the French chouette, formerly meaning jackdaw, the bird. The basis of this, besides the similar sounds, is ascribed by Weekley to the habit of the jackdaw in collecting odd items, reflecting in the inconsistent, mixed contents of the chewette. Charles H Livingston disregarded this theory, favoring the OED's more uncertain position. What was likely, according to Livingston, was a French origin, given the recurring -et(t)e ending and the role of French chefs in compiling the recipes of the cookbook The Forme of Cury, which gives two early recipes for "chewetes". Livingston proposed the word's origins may reference to shell, via the Old French chever/chaver, meaning "to hollow out", including in a 12th century text in reference to pastry.

The last usage of chewette or its alternate spellings identified by the Oxford English Dictionary came in 1688, in Randle Holme III's text The Academy of Armory, which mentions "chewit, or small Pie: minced or otherwise".

== Recipes ==
Records of chewettes being consumed in England exist from the late 14th century to the beginning of the 17th century. An early mention appears in The Forme of Cury, circa 1390, which gives recipes for "chewetes" on days of non-fasting and fasting:

CHEWETES ON FLESHE DAY
Take there meat of Pork and carve it all to pieces. and hens therewith and do it in a pan and fry it & make a coffin [casing] as to a pie small & do therein. & do thereupon yolks of eggs, hard, powder of ginger and salt, cover it & fry it in grease. Otherwise bake it well and serve it forth.

CHEWETES ON FYSSH DAY
Take turbot, haddock, codling and hake and seethe it. Grind it small and do thereto dates, ground, raisins, pine-nuts, good powder and salt. Make a coffin as before said, close this therein, and fry it in oil. Otherwise stew it in ginger with sugar, or in wine, or bake it, & serve forth.

In the English cookbook Liber Cure Cocorum, published circa 1430, recipes are again listed for "chewetes on fysshe day" and "chewetes on flesshe daye". Unlike those in the Forme of Cury, however, these are given in rhyming verse, with the recipe for "chewetes on flesshe daye" given as follows:

Chewetes on flesshe daye
Take lyver of porke and kerve hit smalle,
For a pye be hewn hit schalle,
And hennes therwith do all in a panne,
And frye hit wele as thou wele kanne;
Make a cofyne as for a smalle pye,
And that therein; and yolks therby
Of harde eggs boiled, and also thou take
Powder of gynger and salt to bake;
Kerve hit and fry hit in greece ful gode,
Wele pynched served on last by tho rode
Here endes oure cookery, that I of spake,
Of potage, hasteletes, and mete I bake
And sawce ther to, with oute lying,
Cryst must our sowles to hevene bryng.

By the early 17th century, Gervase Markham gave a recipe for a late chewette in the 1623 text The English Huswife: (Note: In Merkham's recipe, brawnes refers to muscled leg meat. Comfets, also known as sugar plums, were a method of coating fruit or nuts in a sugar syrup.)

Take the brawnes and the wings of Capons and Chickens after they haue been rosted, and pull away the skin; then shred them with fine Mutten suet very small; then season it with cloues, mace, cinamon, suger and salt; then put to raysins of the Sunne and currants, and slic’t dates, and orange pills, and being well mixt together, put it into small coffins made for the purpose, and strow on the top of them good store of caraway Comfets: then couer them, and bake them with a gentle heate, and these Chewets you may also make of rosted Veale, seasoned as before shewed, and of all parts the loyne is the best.

== Related dishes ==
The chewette is credited by several food historians as a precursor to the mince pie. Chewettes were among several similar dishes in the middle of the second millennium; Livingston draws one such comparison to the pasté of contemporary France. According to the food historian Glyn Hughes, chewettes may be similar to the whist pie of Lancashire, which continues to be eaten.

== See also ==
- Battalia pie
- Glossary of historical culinary terms

== Sources ==
=== Primary ===
- Markham, Gervase (1623). The English Huswife. London: Roger Jackson.
- Morris, Richard, ed. (1862) [c. 1430]. Liber Cure Cocorum. Berlin: A Asher & Co.

=== Secondary ===
- Albala, Ken (2006). Cooking in Europe, 1250-1650. Westport, Connecticut: Greenwood Press. ISBN 0-313-33096-4.
- "chewet". Oxford English Dictionary (online ed.). Oxford University Press. doi:10.1093/OED/4276862048. (Subscription or participating institution membership required.)
- Colquhoun, Kate (2007). Taste: the Story of Britain Through its Cooking. New York: Bloomsbury. ISBN 978-1-5969-1410-0.
- Davidson, Alan (2014). "Mince pie". In Davidson, Alan; Jaine, Tom (eds.). The Oxford Companion to Food (3rd ed.). Oxford: Oxford University Press. ISBN 9780191756276.
- Hughes, Glyn (2017). The Lost Foods of England. Winster, Derbyshire: Lulu Press. ISBN 978-0-244-02963-0.
- Livingston, Charles H (August 1960). "Middle English chewette, chawette". Romance Philology. 14 (1). JSTOR 44939150.
- Staveley, Keith; Fitzgerald, Kathleen (2011). Northern Hospitality: Cooking by the Book in New England. Amherst and Boston: University of Massachusetts. ISBN 978-1-55849-861-7.
- Wilson, C Anne (1976) [1973]. Food & Drink in Britain: From the Stone Age to Recent Times. Harmondsworth, London: Penguin. ISBN 0-14-055-101-8.
