= Rook pie =

Rook meat baked into pie

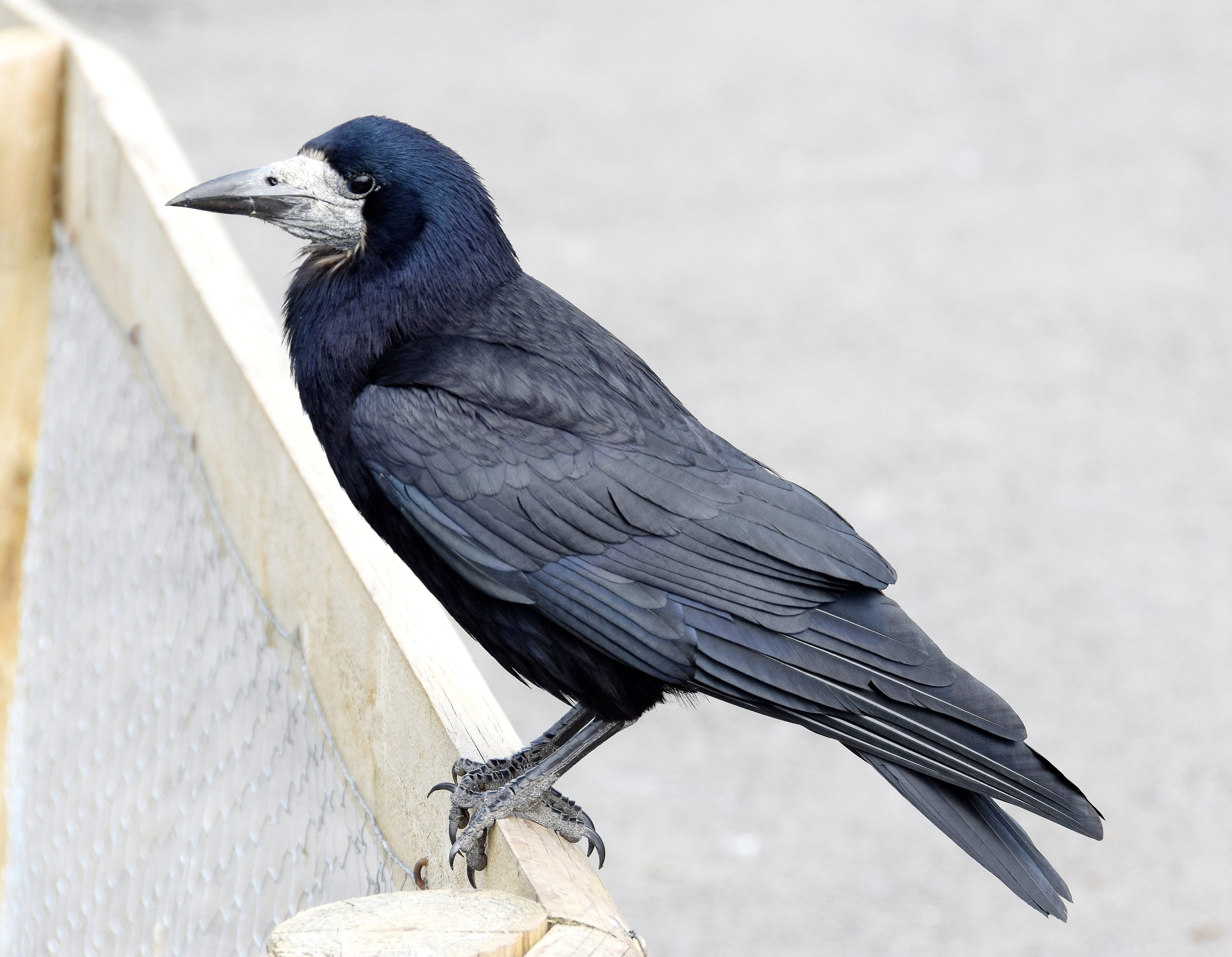
Rook in Gloucestershire, England

Rook pie is a game pie consisting of young rook meat baked into a pie. They generally only use the breast of the bird, with the rest of the bird generally regarded as chewy and bitter. According to the food historian C. Anne Wilson, rook pies have been eaten in the United Kingdom since at least the Tudor era (1485–1603), making their way into cookbooks by the 18th century. These were seasoned simply, and often included hard-boiled eggs. Rook pies experienced a revival in World War II during rationing. Their continued consumption makes them among the last of the crow species consumed in Britain.

== Early history ==
According to the food historian C. Anne Wilson, rook pies have been eaten in the United Kingdom since at least the Tudor era, when physician Thomas Cogan reported "poor folks" were eating rooks, "well baked", though the earliest use of "rook pye" identified by the Oxford English Dictionary would only come in 1738. By the 18th century, recipes were being published in cookbooks, including in Elizabeth Raffald's 1769 The Experienced English Housekeeper:

SKIN and draw six young rooks, and cutout the back bones, season them well with pepper and salt, put them in a deep dish, with a quar-ter of a pint of water, lay over them half a pound of butter, make a good puff paste, and cover the dish, lay a paper over, for it requires a good deal of baking.

The simple seasoning of salt and pepper was typical of the time, which had broken from the elaboratively flavoured avian pies of the previous century. Though Raffald's recipe did not include them, hard-boiled eggs were a common addition in recipes.

An assessment of rook meat and rook pies offered in the 1880 edition of Cassell's Dictionary of Cookery reflected a general sense that rook meat was not to be prized. It reports that "The rook affords a dry and coarse meat. A pie made of young rooks is tolerable; at least, it is the best form for using these birds as food... Rooks require long stewing, or they will not be tender. The breasts are the only parts of the birds which are really worth using."

== 20th century onwards ==
Recipes for rook pies appeared in the Second World War in the United Kingdom, as catching and eating wild foods gained appeal amid rationing. Reflecting on her experiences of the war, the Irish cookery writer Theodora FitzGibbon later recalled "‘I even made a rook pie one day which was eagerly devoured".

Rooks breed in large colonies known as rookeries, in some areas leading to population control measures taking place in the spring. Writing in the 1950s, Dorothy Hartley opined that a rook pie was only worth making when the young rooks killed through such measures would otherwise go to waste. Little of the small bird's meat was considered edible by Hartley; the meat from the skin and back deemed "black and bitter", leaving only small, skinless breast meat and part of the thighs. The final recipe placed the rook meat among several others—steaks, preferably beef, and bacon—and served it with mustard.

By the 1970s, consumption was rare. The few times it was consumed, according to The World Atlas of Food, came because a farmer had shot the birds as they damaged crops. In such preparations, the breasts were sandwiched between steaks with onions and a sherry-based gravy, before being enclosed in pastry. The rest of the bird was disposed of, regarded as too chewy and bitter. In The Oxford Companion to Food, Alan Davidson attested to the rarity of rook pie. The rook's continued, rare consumption means they are among the last, if not the last of the crow species eaten in Britain.

== See also ==
- Eating crow
- List of pies, tarts and flans

== Sources ==
=== Primary ===
- Cogan, Thomas (1612) [1584]. The Haven of Health: Chiefly Made for the Comfort of Students, and Consequently for All Those That Have a Care of Their Health, Amplified Upon Five Works of Hippokrates. London: John Norton.
- Raffald, Elizabeth (1769). The Experienced English Housekeeper. Manchester: J Harrop.
- "rook pie". Oxford English Dictionary (online ed.). Oxford University Press. 2010. doi:10.1093/OED/5574091560. (Subscription or participating institution membership required.)

=== Secondary ===
- Cassell's Dictionary of Cookery: With Numerous Illustrations; Containing About Nine Thousand Recipes. London: Cassel, Petter, Galpin. 1880.
- Davidson, Alan (2014). "Rook". In Davidson, Alan; Jaine, Tom (eds.). The Oxford Companion to Food (3rd ed.). Oxford University Press. ISBN 978-0-19-967733-7.
- Grigson, Jane, ed. (1974). The World Atlas of Food: A Gourmet's Guide to the Great Regional Dishes of the World. London: Mitchell Beazley Publishers Limited. ISBN 0-85533-038-4.
- Hartley, Dorothy (1996) [1954]. Food in England. London: Little, Brown and Company. ISBN 0-316-87900-2.
- Hughes, Glyn (2017). The Lost Foods of England. Winster, Derbyshire: Lulu Press. ISBN 978-0-244-02963-0.
- Spencer, Colin (1993). The Heretic's Feast: A History of Vegetarianism. London: Fourth Estate. ISBN 1-85702-078-2.
- Wilson, C Anne (1976) [1973]. Food & Drink in Britain: From the Stone Age to Recent Times. Harmondsworth, London: Penguin. ISBN 0-14-055-101-8.
