= Eating crow =

English-language idiom

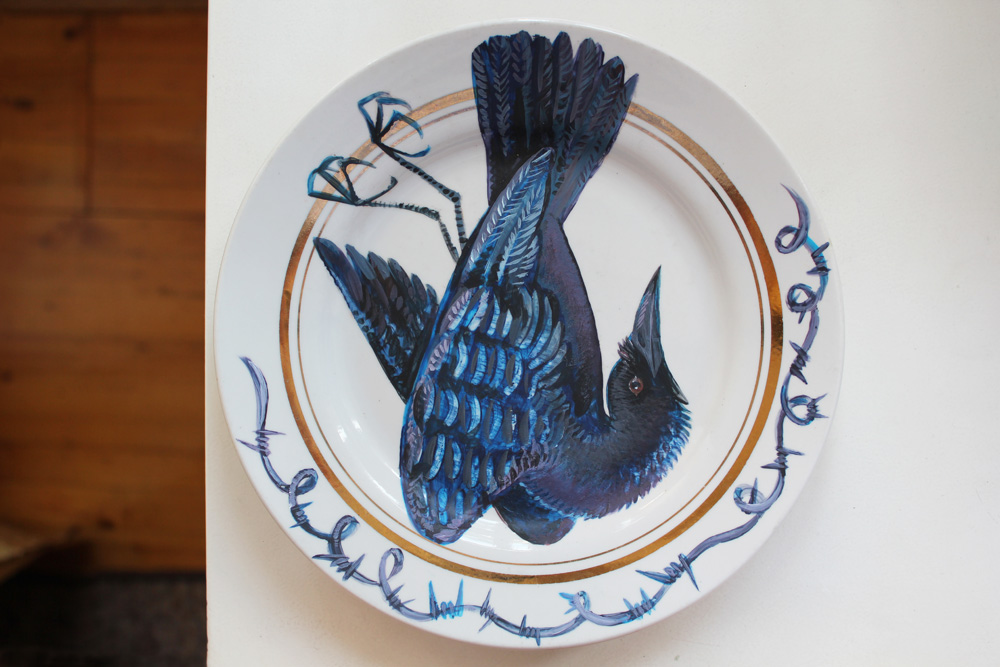
Black crow painted on a plate

Eating crow is a colloquial idiom, used in some English-speaking countries, that means humiliation by admitting having been proven wrong after taking a strong position. The crow is a carrion-eater that is presumably repulsive to eat in the same way that being proven wrong might be emotionally hard to swallow. The exact origin of the idiom is unknown, but it probably began with an American humor story published around 1850 about a smart-aleck New York farmer who is outwitted.

Eating crow is of a family of idioms having to do with eating and being proven incorrect, such as to "eat dirt", to "eat one's hat" (or shoe), or to put one's foot in their mouth; all probably originating from "to eat one's words", which first appears in print in 1571 in one of John Calvin's tracts on Psalm 62: "God eateth not his words when he hath once spoken".

An old Australian demonym for South Australian people is Croweater, though it does not carry the same idiomatic meaning as eating crow.

== Origin theories ==
Literally eating a crow is traditionally seen as being distasteful; the crow, if understood to be a type of raven, is one of the birds listed in Leviticus chapter 11 as being unfit for eating. Scavenging carrion eaters have a long association with the battlefield; "They left the corpses behind for the raven, never was there greater slaughter in this island," says the Anglo-Saxon Chronicle. Along with buzzards, rats, and other carrion-eating scavenging animals, there is a tradition in Western culture going back to at least the Middle Ages of seeing them as distasteful (even illegal at times) to eat, and thus naturally humiliating if forced to consume against one's will.

In the modern figurative sense of being proven wrong, eating crow probably first appeared in print in 1850, as an American humor piece about a rube farmer near Lake Mahopack, New York. The OED V2 says the story was first published as "Eating Crow" in San Francisco's Daily Evening Picayune (3 December 1851), but two other early versions exist, one in The Knickerbocker (date unknown), and one in the Saturday Evening Post (2 November 1850) called "Can You Eat Crow?" All tell a similar story: a slow-witted New York farmer is outfoxed by his (presumed urban) boarders; after they complain about the poor food being served, the farmer discounts the complaint by claiming he "kin eat anything", and the boarders wonder if he can eat a crow. "I kin eat a crow!" the farmer says. The boarders take him up on the challenge but also secretly spike the crow with Scotch snuff. The story ends with the farmer saying: "I kin eat a crow, but I be darned if I hanker after it." Although the humor might produce only a weak smile today, it was probably a knee slapper by 19th-century standards, guaranteeing the story would be often retold in print and word of mouth, thus explaining, in part, the idiom's origin. In 1854, Samuel Putnam Avery published a version called "Crow Eating" in his collection Mrs. Partington's Carpet-Bag of Fun.

A similar British idiom is to eat humble pie. The English phrase is something of a pun—"umbles" were the intestines, offal and other less valued meats of a deer. Pies made of this were said to be served to those of lesser class who did not eat at the king's/lord's/governor's table, possibly following speculation in Brewer's Dictionary of Phrase and Fable but there is little evidence for this. Early references in cookbooks such as Liber Cure Cocorum present a grand dish with exotic spices. Another dish likely to be served with humble pie is rook pie (rooks being closely related to crows). "Pie" is also an antiquated term for the European magpie, another bird species related to crows. There is a similarity with the American version of "umble", since the Oxford English Dictionary defines crow (sb3) as meaning "intestine or mesentery of an animal" and cites usages from the 17th century into the 19th century (e.g., Farley, Lond Art of Cookery: "the harslet, which consists of the liver, crow, kidneys, and skirts)."

== South Australian croweater ==
A popular Australian demonym for South Australian people is "croweater". The earliest known usage dates to 1881 in the book To Mount Browne and Back by J. C. F. Johnson who writes: "I was met with the startling information that all Adelaide men were croweaters… because it was asserted that the early settlers… when short of mutton, made a meal of the unwary crow". According to a newsletter of the Australian National Dictionary Centre, early settlers did in fact eat cockatoo and parrots. How they became known as crow eaters instead is unknown but notably this term appears after the American usage in 1850 but does not carry the same idiomatic or pejorative meaning of being proven wrong.

== Notable examples of use ==
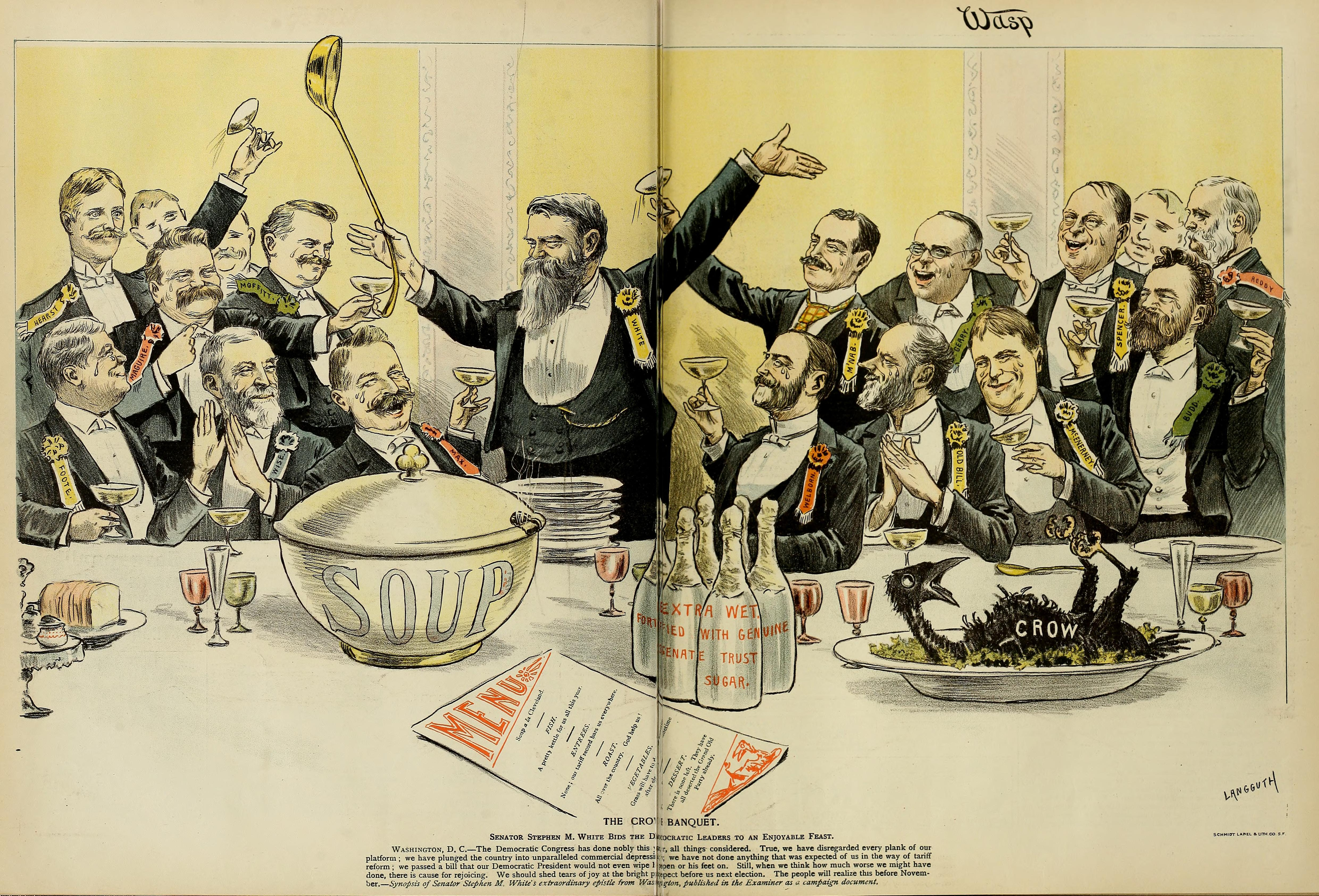
"The Crow Banquet," a political cartoon by Theodore Langguth published in The Wasp mocking U.S. Senator Stephen M. White and fellow California Democrats, September 8, 1894

The following examples illustrate notable uses of the idiom after its origin in the 1850s.

Rudyard Kipling (1865–1936) used this concept in his short story "The Strange Ride of Morrowbie Jukes" (1885). Morrowbie Jukes, a European colonist in India, falls into a sand-pit from which he cannot escape. Another man, a native Indian, is also trapped there who catches wild crows and eats them, saying "Once I was Brahmin and proud man; and now I eat crows." Morrowbie Jukes is also reduced to eating crow.

After incumbent Harry S. Truman defeated Thomas E. Dewey in the 1948 United States presidential election despite many media predictions of a Dewey victory, The Washington Post sent a telegram to the victor:

You Are Hereby Invited To A "Crow Banquet" To Which This Newspaper Proposes To Invite Newspaper Editorial Writers, Political Reporters And Editors, Including Our Own, Along With Pollsters, Radio Commentators And Columnists ... Main Course Will Consist of Breast of Tough Old Crow En Glace. (You Will Eat Turkey.)

On the night of 7 November 2000, after the polls had closed for the 2000 United States presidential election, CNN predicted Al Gore would win Florida and the presidency. Later, CNN retracted the call and cited Florida as being too close to call before finally awarding Florida to George W. Bush. Anchor Jeff Greenfield likened CNN's error to eating crow. Many other American newspapers retracted and were also said to eat crow.

In 2014, broadcaster Wendy Williams ate a gumbo made with crow meat live on The Wendy Williams Show, after losing a bet saying that Kim Kardashian and Kanye West's marriage wouldn't last for more than 72 days.

== See also ==
- Foot in Mouth Award
- Humble pie
