= Utilis Coquinario =

14th century English cookery book

Utilis Coquinario ('Useful for the Kitchen') is an English cookery book written in Middle English in the late fourteenth or very early fifteenth century. The text is contained in the Hans Sloane collection of manuscripts in the British Library and is numbered Sloane MS 468.

== Author ==
The author's name is unknown. It has been theorised that he was "the high-ranking chef of a large kitchen", though not one as large as that of Richard II (for example, compare this text to The Forme of Cury). It is accordingly assumed that he was a man. (Note: Though women of the time were responsible for basic domestic cooking, professional chef work in large kitchens was undertaken by men.) The resemblance of some of the author's recipes to early French recipes indicates the author may have had a reading knowledge of Middle French. The author's references to "fyssh day" and Lent indicate that the author cooked for a Christian household.

== Text ==
=== Contents ===
The manuscript contains recipes for things such as butter of almond milk, roasted duck, a meat pottage and a sweet-and-sour fish preparation. The manuscript is loosely organised and has no real system beyond a basic grouping of recipes for cooking birds, blancmange, and fruits and flowers.

=== Purpose ===
It has been suggested that the text was not intended as a cookbook for the layperson since the level of lay literacy at the time was still relatively low and distribution of manuscripts was a "patchy affair". Several alternative purposes for its creation have been proposed, including: serving as testimony to the author's culinary skill, presenting and influencing trends, securing the status of the chef as a professional, and serving as a tool for professionals (e.g. doctors and lawyers) aspiring to raise their class status by learning about higher-class meals. The latter theory has been proposed in part due to the text's location in the Sloane collection of manuscripts, where it is placed in a selection of medical recipes described as "utilitarian".

=== Modern study ===
The text is notable to both culinary historians and linguists, containing several examples of unique recipes and vocabulary.

==== Historical interest ====
Of historical interest, the work contains the only references to recipes such as pyany (a poultry dish garnished with peonies) and heppee (a rose-hip broth). The text was written in the time of Geoffrey Chaucer and provides insight into the types of food Chaucer may have eaten and written about. As was the case with most late medieval cooking, the author did not associate colours with specific flavours, but he did occasionally use colour to denote contrasts in flavour. For example, one of the included fish recipes uses saffron in part of the dish flavoured with sugar and ginger (giving that part a reddish, saffron colour), and leaves the remaining part of the dish white to denote that it is flavoured with sugar only.

==== Linguistic interest ====
Of linguistic interest, it contains the only known references in fourteenth-century English texts to cormorants and finches. Additionally, it contains the only references to woodcocks, botores (bittern), pluuers (plovers), and teals in fourteenth-century English cookbooks, though all are found elsewhere in menus of that era.

== See also ==
- British Library Foundation Collections
- Cookbook § History
- List of medieval cookbooks

== Bibliography ==
- Carroll, Ruth (1996). "Utilis Coquinario and its Unnamed Author" (PDF). In Walker, Harlan (ed.). Cooks & Other People: Proceedings of the Oxford Symposium on Food and Cookery 1995. Totnes, Devon: Prospect Books. ISBN 978-0-907325-72-7.
- Hieatt, Constance B.; Butler, Sharon, eds. (1985). Curye on Inglysch: English Culinary Manuscripts of the Fourteenth Century (including the Forme of Cury). Early English Text Society Supplementary Series. Vol. 8. Oxford University Press. ISBN 978-0-19-722409-0.
- Kernan, Sarah Peters (2016). "For al them that delight in Cookery": The Production and Use of Cookery Books in England, 1300–1600 (PDF) (PhD thesis). Ohio State University. OCLC 958832793. Archived from the original on 31 July 2018.
- Notaker, Henry (2017). A History of Cookbooks: From Kitchen to Page Over Seven Centuries. Univ. of California Press. ISBN 9780520294004.
- Woolgar, C.M. (21 November 2017). "Medieval Food and Colour" (PDF). Journal of Medieval History. 44 (1): 1–20. doi:10.1080/03044181.2017.1401391. S2CID 165273557.
