= Das Buoch von guoter Spise =

German recipe collection, around 1350

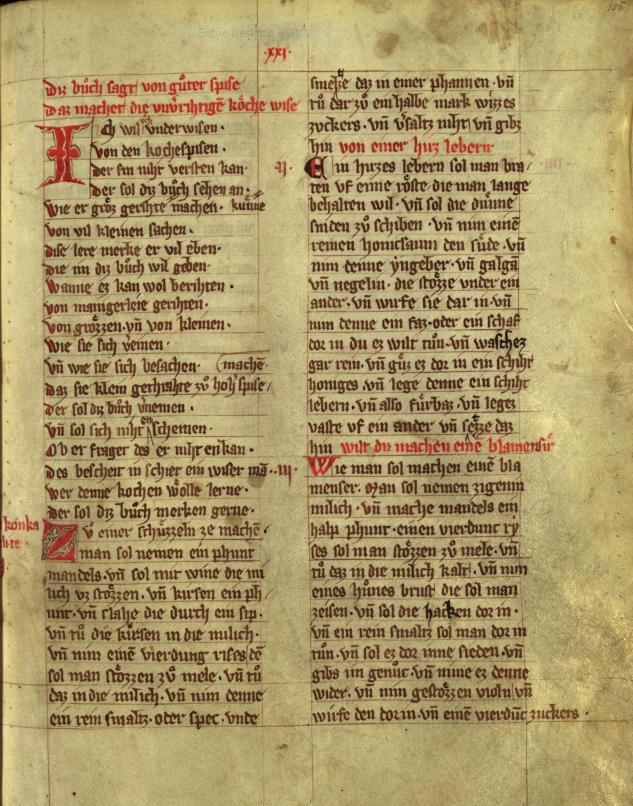
The first page of the Munich manuscript of Das Buoch von guoter Spise

Das Buoch von guoter Spise (English: The book of good cooking), also called Würzburger Kochbuch (English: The Würzburg cookbook), is the first German-language cookbook in the literature of medieval cuisine.

== History of the book ==
The recipe book was compiled in the late 1340s by Prothonotary Michael de Leone, born around 1300 in Würzburg. It appears in several manuscripts, notably in the Würzburger Liederhandschrift, in English the "Würzburg Song Manuscript", part of the Hausbuch des Michael de Leone ("House-Book of Michael de Leone"). The Hausbuch is composed of two volumes, of which only the second is well preserved. In this second volume, a small part (ranging from folios 156^{r} to 165^{v}), ten sheets out of a total of nearly 300, contains the Buoch von guoter Spîse. There is a second manuscript dating from the first half of the 15th century, now held in the Anhaltische Landesbücherei Dessau: MS Georg. 278.2^{o}, ff. 123^{v} to 132^{v}.

== Readership ==
The text makes it easy to identify the target audience: the minor nobility and the wealthy urban bourgeoisie. The urban economy at that time created a new form of mobility, which led to a transfer of cultural elements and culinary customs. Indeed, at that time, cooking served as a sign of social status. As a result, not only local products are consumed, but also exotic products that are very popular. The meal thus becomes one of the most important symbols of social status. This distinction is also evident in the language; we thus distinguish the common food of the lower classes from the good food of the middle and upper classes. One is composed of broth and bread, the other of roasts, poultry and game. The manual must therefore be seen as a collection of recipes for the more affluent.

== Content ==
The manual contains 96 recipes for bourgeois cuisine. These are mainly easy-to-prepare dishes; milk, butter, and common spices and herbs such as ginger, parsley, lovage, pepper, and sage are often mentioned, while condiments used at court such as salt, cinnamon, anise, nutmeg, and saffron are much less often mentioned. The dishes are therefore suitable for cooks with moderate experience and reasonable financial means. Spices are highly valued everywhere, especially in medieval culinary art; more than 80 percent of all recipes include several spices.

== Sample recipe ==
The following recipe appears in Das Buoch von guoter Spise thus:

Nim wintriubele und stoz sur ephele. diz tu zu sammene. menge ez mit wine. und drüches uz. dise salse ist gut zu scheffinem braten und zu hüenren. und zu vischen. und heizzet agraz.

It has been translated into English by Alia Atlas:

Take grapes and pound sour apples. Add this together. Mix it with wine and squeeze it out. This sauce is good for roasting sheep and hens and fish and is called Agraz.

This recipe has been put into a more contemporary form by Trude Ehlert:

250g [9 oz] white or black grapes
2 Boskoop apples (or Granny Smiths)
¼ litre [8 fl oz] red wine
1 pinch of pepper

Preparation: peel and core the apples, cut into strips, blend the apple slices and grapes into a puree, mix with the wine, pass through a chinois and serve cold.

The sauce has a slightly acidic, refreshing taste and is perfect with a leg of lamb, a roast venison in a crust, a baked chicken or a meat pâté.

== See also ==
- List of medieval cookbooks
