= Hawawshi =

Traditional Egyptian dish

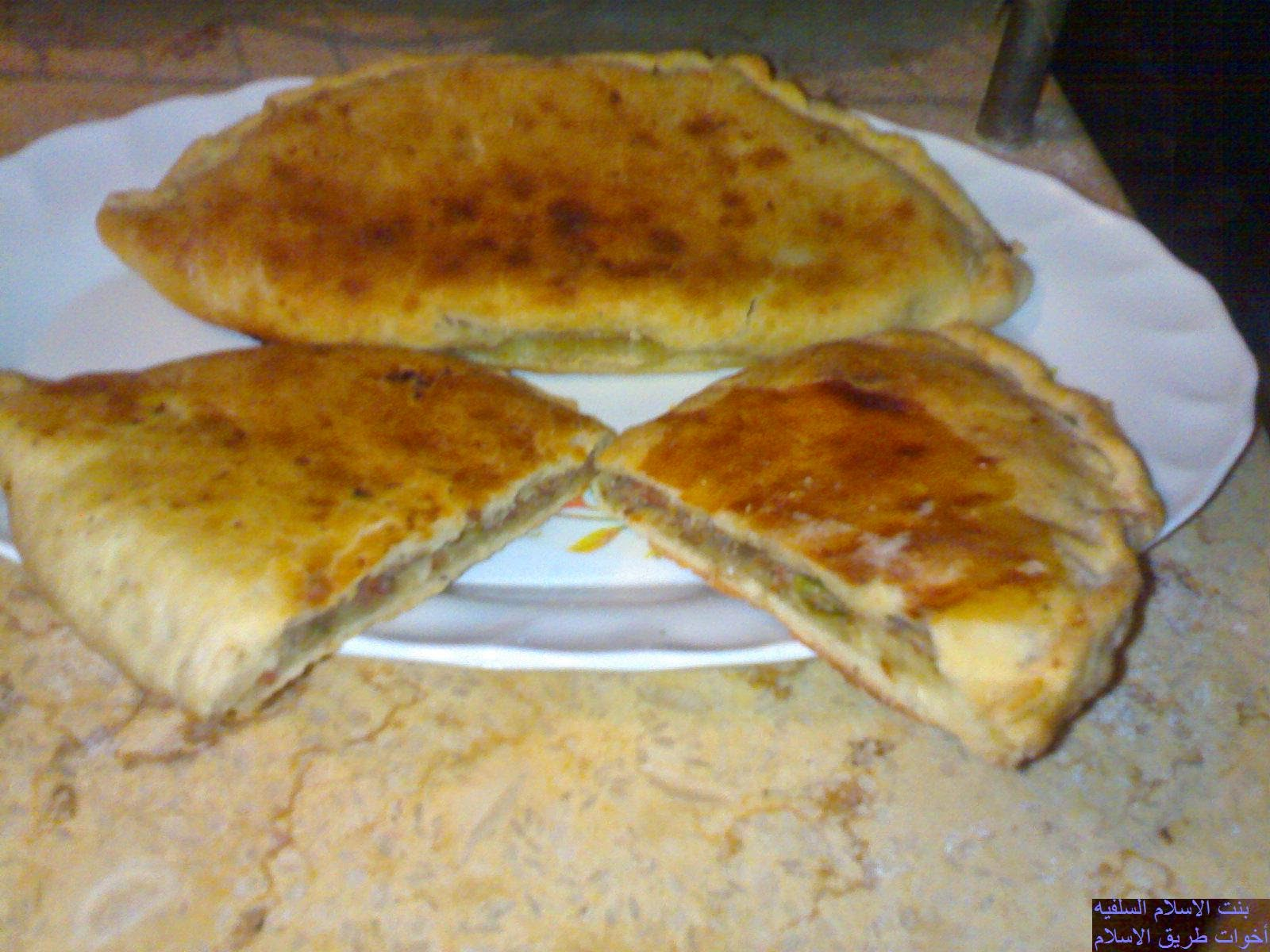
- Alternative names: Hawwaoshi
- Place of origin: Egypt
- Associated cuisine: Egyptian
- Main ingredients: Meat
- Ingredients generally used: Onions, pepper, parsley and sometimes hot peppers or chillies

Hawawshi (sometimes spelled hawwaoshi; Egyptian Arabic: حواوشى, IPA: [ħæˈwæwʃi]) is a traditional Egyptian dish. It is a pita stuffed with minced meat and spiced with onions, pepper, parsley, and occasionally chilies. The major variants of hawawshi are "baladi" (standard) and Alexandrian. In most of Egypt, it is baked by filling the flat Egyptian bread with the meat mix and then baking it in the oven. In Alexandria, the ingredients are placed between two circular layers of dough, then baked in an oven. Alexandrian hawawshi also usually have different spices and seasonings. Hawawshi has spread to other countries in the Middle East and North Africa with some variation. In the Levant, it is made using saj bread and includes hot peppers in the filling. In Algeria, it is known as "muhajib" and is eaten with soup or a yoghurt salad.

Hawawshi is commonly made in Egyptian homes and is also served in some restaurants, usually as a take-away. Prices at restaurants range from £E30 to 100, depending on the size and amount of meat used.

== History ==
According to one story, Hawawshi was invented in 1971 by an Egyptian butcher named Ahmed al-Hawawsh . From his stall in the Souk Al-Tawfik neighborhood in Cairo, hawawshi spread throughout Cairo and then to the rest of Egypt. Since al-Hawawsh's death, hawawshi have become especially popular in Sharqia Governorate in the Nile Delta, where the best hawawshi are reported to be found.

Other stories claim hawawshi is a variation of a 13th-Century recipe mentioned in Ibn al-Adims cookbook, titled Kitab al-Wuslah ila l-habib.

== Variations and similar dishes ==
=== Arayes ===
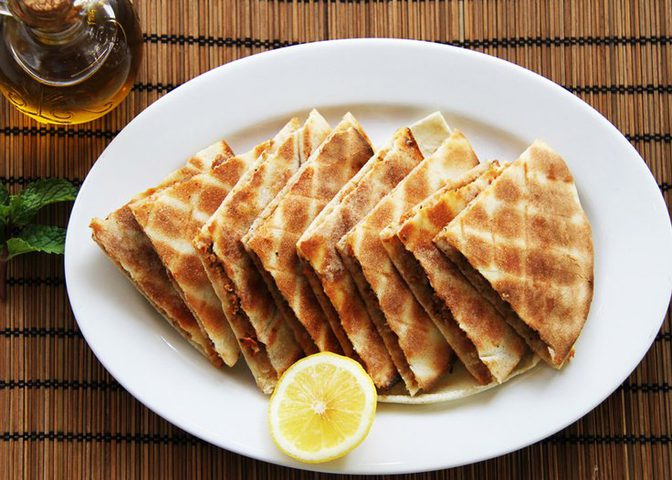
Lebanese Arayes

Arayes (Levantine Arabic: عرايس) is a similar dish popular around the Levant. It is made with Levantine pita rather than Egyptian bread. Arayes are made by stuffing raw kofta into (already baked) pita bread, then cooking the meat while it is in the bread. The meat is typically spiced lamb, beef, or a mix of the two, a variety of vegetables and other ingredients are mixed in with the meat, like bell pepper, cheese, or tomatoes.

==== Etymology ====
Arayes means "brides" in Arabic, it is the plural of aroos (عروس), the origin of the name is up for debate, the word originally referred to roll-ups made from shrak bread, with different fillings.

== See also ==
- Sambusa, the Somali equivalent
- Fatayer
- List of Middle Eastern dishes
- Cornish pasty
