= Henrik Harpestræng =

Danish botanist (1164–1244)

Henrik Harpestræng (1164 – 2 April 1244) was a Danish botanical and medical author. He was a canon at the Roskilde Cathedral. His name literally means harp string. His greatest work was an urtebog (book of herbs), written in Danish. The book consists of 150 chapters dealing with plants and plant parts. The main body of text is probably translations from two Latin works, De Viribus Herbarum by a person who calls himself Aemilius Macer, but is rather Odo Magdunensis, and De gradibus liber by Constantinus Africanus. However, there are a good many sections of which Henrik Harpestræng is undoubtedly the original author. The book is also an invaluable source for Danish medieval plant names. The best preserved copy of this manuscript dates from the 13th century - now kept in Stockholm.

Henrik Harpestræng was probably also the Henricus Dacus or Henricus de Dacia who authored a Latin essay on plants, Liber de simplicibus medicinis laxativis, and to the Maistre Henry de Danemarche, of 1181, whom a manuscript in the National Library in Paris designates as "excellent medecin à Orleans et grant astrologicien". This probably indicates that Henrik studied in France.

== See also ==
- Libellus De Arte Coquinaria
