= Libellus de arte coquinaria =

Cookbook

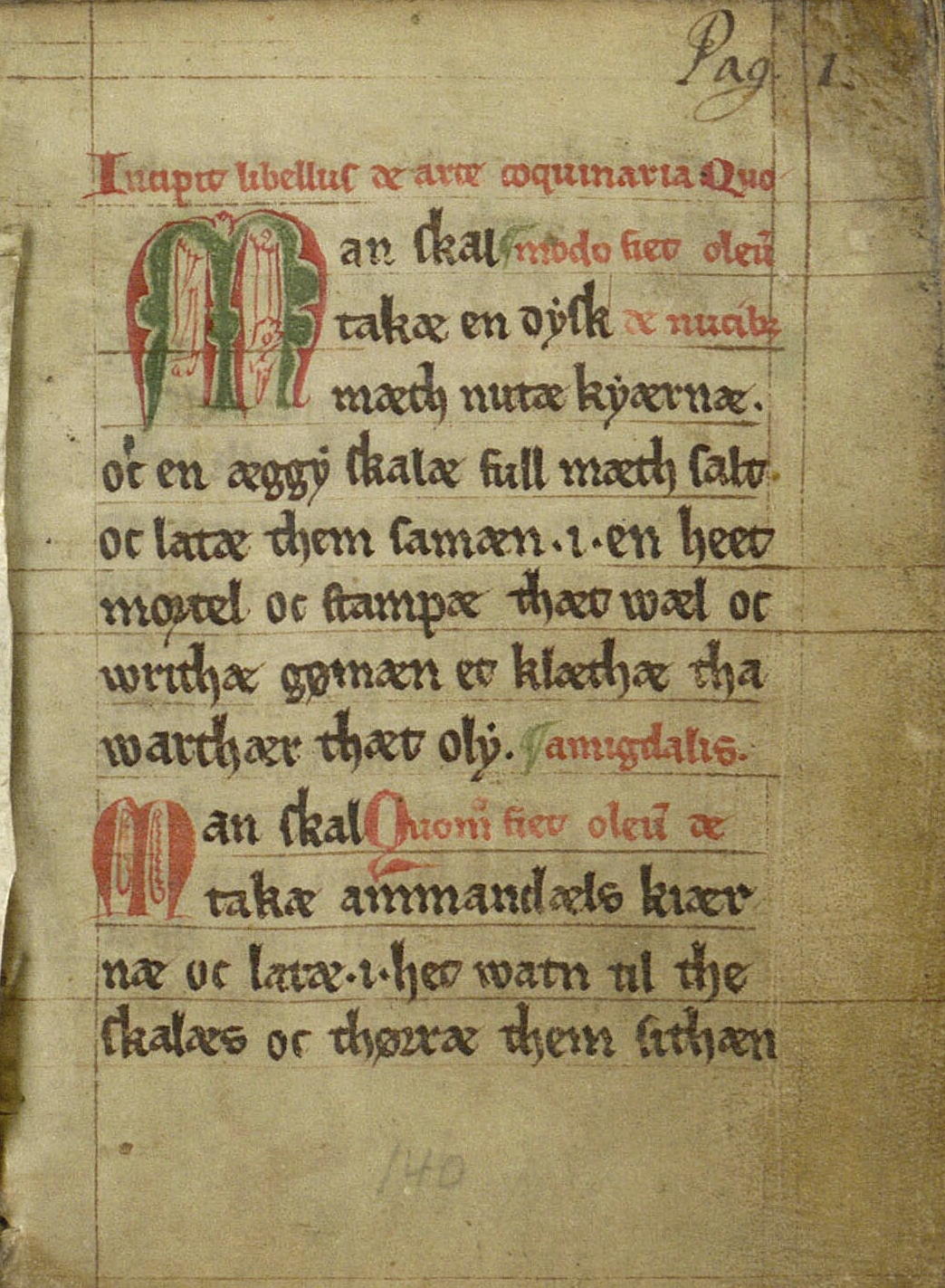
Libellus de arte coquinaria, first page of the Manuscript K with recipes for walnut oil and almond oil, Royal Library of Copenhagen

Libellus de arte coquinaria (The Little Book of Culinary Arts) is a cookbook containing thirty-five early Northern European recipes. The cookbook is preserved today in 4 different manuscripts, of which 2 are written in Danish (manuscripts K and Q kept in Copenhagen), one in Old Norse (manuscript D kept in Dublin), and one in Low German (manuscript W kept in Wolfenbuttel, Germany). Dating from the early thirteenth century, the Libellus is considered to be among the oldest of medieval North-European culinary recipe collections.

== Content ==
The 2 Danish manuscripts K and Q are rough translations of an even earlier cookbook written in Low German, which was the original text that all the four manuscripts are based on. The cookbook consists of many recipes for chicken and egg based dishes, a few desserts (based on almonds, dairy and eggs), many sauce recipes for pickling, preserving and using as marinade rather than for eating directly at dinner, and recipes on how to make almond oil, almond milk, almond butter pie, and walnut oil. The condiments used in the cookbook, especially for the sauces, are salt, vinegar, garlic, onions, parsley, mint leaves, grapes, wine and saffron. The "Salsor Dominorum" sauce for wild game pickling requires the spice mix of cloves, black pepper, cinnamon, nutmeg, ginger and cardamom. The same spice mix is still used today in German and Dutch Spekulatius ginger cookies, traditionally baked for Christmas.

The Danish manuscript K of the Libellus was found in a three-part collection of manuscripts consisting of a book of herbs, a book of stones and minerals used in medieval medicine, and Libellus de arte coquinaria. The two former parts were written or translated by the Danish medic Henrik Harpestræng, who died in 1244.

The Low German manuscript W is the manuscript nr. 1213 of the socalled Helmstedter Manuscripts, preserved in Wolfenbuttel, dated anywhere between 1321 and 1438. This manuscript W also contains several medical and herbal books written by different scribes, much like the Danish manuscript K that was part of the medical Harpenstreng book.

The Danish manuscript Q was found by the Danish historian Christian Molbech some years before 1844 as a part of a medieval, Danish law book, handwritten on 5 parchment leaves (10 pages), where the first page is the last of the law book, and the 9 remaining pages are the cookbook. Molbech personally found this manuscript Q not very fitting as a part of a law book, while he thought Manuscript K was more fitting in the medical book of Harpenstreng.

== Publications ==
The first printed transcription of the Danish manuscript K of "Libellus" was published by Christian Molbech in 1826 in his book Henrik Harpeſtrengs Danske lægebog fra det trettende Aarhundrede: förste Gang udgivet efter et Pergamentshaandskrift i det store Kongelige Bibliothek, med Inledning, Anmærkninger og Glossarium af Christian Molbech.

The first printed transcription of the Danish Manuscript Q of Libellus was published by Christian Molbech in 1844 in his article in Historisk Tidsskrift, volume 5, pages 537-546. He mentioned, how he also published the Harpenstreng medical book in 1826, which the cookbook manuscript K was a part of. In the same article, Molbech thoroughly analysed the language and recipe differences in the Danish Manuscript Q, that he has found as a part of a medieval law book manuscript some years earlier. In this publication, Molbech added footnotes explaining and translating forgotten Danish and Latin terminology.

The Old Norse manuscript of Libellus was published as part of the Collection included in An Old Icelandic Medical Miscellany [Ms. Royal Irish Academy 23D 43] in 1931 by Henning Larsen.

- English translation: Libellus De Arte Coquinaria: An Early Northern Cookery Book (2001, editors: Grewe, Rudolf; Hieatt, Constance B.: Arizona Center for Medieval and Renaissance Studies, ISBN 978-0866982641): combines the four surviving versions.

== Manuscripts ==
- Royal Library of Copenhagen, Denmark Ny samling Nr.66, 8vo, c.1300, and Ny samling Nr.70R, 8vo, 14th century, both in Danish (K and Q respectively)
- Dublin, Royal Irish Academy 23 D43, late 15th century, in Old Norse (D)
- Herzog August Bibliothek of Wolfenbüttel, Germany, Helmst.1213, late 14th - early 15th century, in Low German (W)

== Research ==
- German scientific and literary analysis of manuscript W can be found on Hanschriftencensus

== See also ==
- List of medieval cookbooks
