= Ibn Razīn al-Tujībī =

13th-century Muslim-Andalucían scholar

- Born: 1227; Murcia, Al-Andalus
- Died: 1293 (aged 65–66); Tunis
- Occupation: Scholar
- Notable work: Fiḍālat al-Khiwān fī Ṭayyibāt al-Ṭaʿām wa-l-Alwān

Ibn Razīn al-Tujībī was a 13th-century Muslim Andalusi scholar who wrote "one of only two cookbooks to survive" from that era.

Al-Tujībī was born in 1227 to a wealthy family of scholars living in Murcia. The Reconquista led many Muslim families to flee, including al-Tujībī's. In 1247 the family ended up in Béjaïa. By 1259, al-Tujībī had relocated to Tunis.

While al-Tujībī wrote many books, only his cookbook, Fiḍālat al-Khiwān fī Ṭayyibāt al-Ṭaʿām wa-l-Alwān "Best of Delectable Foods and Dishes from al-Andalus and al-Maghrib", survives. The cookbook was composed in Tunis around 1260.

The cookbook was composed of recipes from al-Tujībī's Andalusi heritage, where dishes had Muslim, Christian, and Jewish influences. Until 2018, it was thought that there was no complete copy of the book remaining, until an accidental discovery at the British Library. Bink Hallum asked for the expertise of the food historian Nawal Nasrallah, who realised the significance of the finding. Nasrallah has since translated a copy version of the book into English, which was published in 2021.

There are three known extant manuscripts of the text:

- Staatsbibliothek zu Berlin, Wetzstein 1207
- British Library, Or5927
- Real Academia de la Historia (Madrid), Gayangos XVI

Daniel Newman translated the cookbook under the title The Exile’s Cookbook: Medieval Gastronomic Treasures from al-Andalus & North Africa, which was published in 2023.

== See also ==
- Nawal Nasrallah
- List of medieval cookbooks
