= Gustavus Brander =

British naturalist

Gustavus Brander, c. 1770

Gustavus Brander FRS (1720 – 21 January 1787), an English naturalist who came from a Swedish family, was born in London in 1720. He was brought up as a merchant, in which capacity he achieved success and became a director of the Bank of England.

His leisure time was occupied in scientific pursuits, and at his country residence at Christchurch in Hampshire he became interested in the fossils so abundant in the clays of Hordwell and Barton. A set of these was presented by him to the British Museum, and they were described by Daniel Solander in the beautifully illustrated work entitled Fossilia Hantoniensia collecta, et in Musaeo Britannico deposita a Gustavo Brander (London, 1766). Brander was elected Fellow of the Royal Society (F.R.S.) in 1754, and he was also a trustee of the British Museum. He was a founder member of the Society for the Encouragement of Arts, Manufactures and Commerce in 1754.

Brander owned a manuscript of The Forme of Cury, one of the oldest medieval cookbooks, which was published by Samuel Pegge and presented to the Queen in 1790.

== Published works ==
- Brander, Gustavo (1766). Fossilia Hantoniensia collecta, et in Musaeo Britannico deposita [Hampshire fossils collected, and deposited in the British Museum] (in Latin and English) (1st ed.). London. 1766Brander.
