= Barm =

Foam on fermenting liquid

Barm, also called ale yeast, is the foam or scum formed on the top of a fermenting liquid, such as beer, wine, or feedstock for spirits or industrial ethanol distillation. It is used to leaven bread, or set up fermentation in a new batch of liquor. Barm, as a leaven, has also been made from ground millet combined with must out of wine-tubs and is sometimes used in English baking as a synonym for a natural leaven (sourdough). Various cultures derived from barm, usually Saccharomyces cerevisiae, are ancestral to most forms of brewer's yeast and baker's yeast currently on the market.

In Britain, barm was one of the original sources of yeast used by British bakers, alongside emptyings (or emptins). Emptyings were a homemade product similar to barm and usually made from hops or potatoes and the dregs of cider or ale casks, was a common leavener for those living in rural areas far from a brewery, distillery, or bakery from which they could source barm or yeast. The use of barm receded in the 19th century, as compressed yeast became widely available.

A barm cake is a soft, round, flattish bread roll from North West England, traditionally leavened with barm. In Ireland, barm is used in the traditional production of barmbrack, a fruited bread.

== See also ==
- Glossary of historical culinary terms
- Kaiser roll
- Sour mash
- Yeast in winemaking
