= Msemmen =

North African traditional flatbread

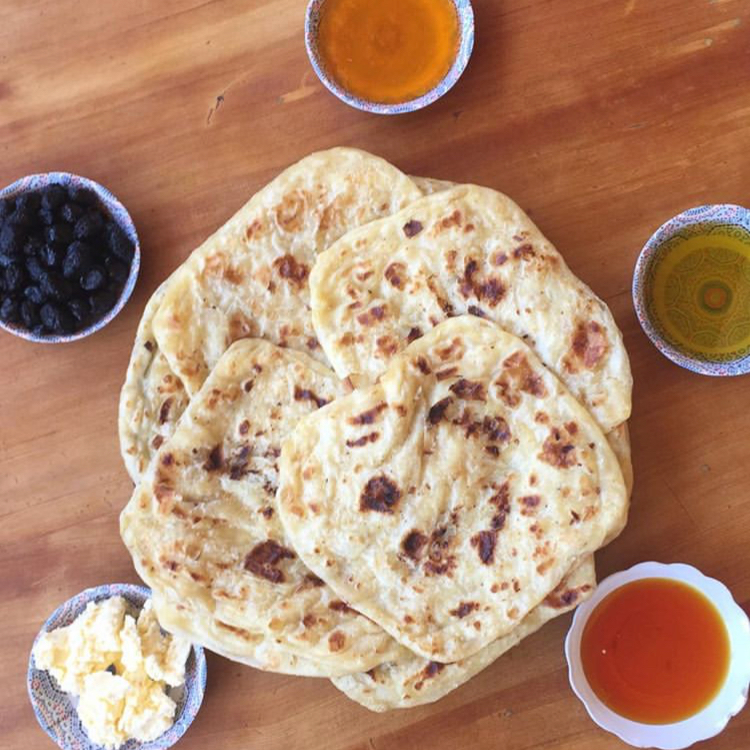
- Type: Bread
- Place of origin: Maghreb
- Main ingredients: Flour, durum wheat semolina, dry yeast, melted butter, salt, sugar and water
- Variations: Mhadjeb

Msemmen (Arabic: مسمن, romanized: musamman, msamman) or rghaif (رغايف), is a traditional flatbread originally from the Maghreb, commonly found in Algeria and Morocco, It is folded into square pancakes with multiple internal layers and cooked on a griddle, usually served with honey or a cup of aromatic morning mint tea or coffee. M'semmen can also be stuffed with meat (khlea) or onion and tomatoes. The small msemmen pancakes are of Berber origin.

== Varieties and similar foods ==
There is a variety that is made from pulling the dough into strands and forming a disk that is also called mlewi in Algeria, Tunisia and Morocco.

== See also ==
- List of breads
- Berber cuisine
