= Mahdjouba =

Algerian food item

Mhadjeb
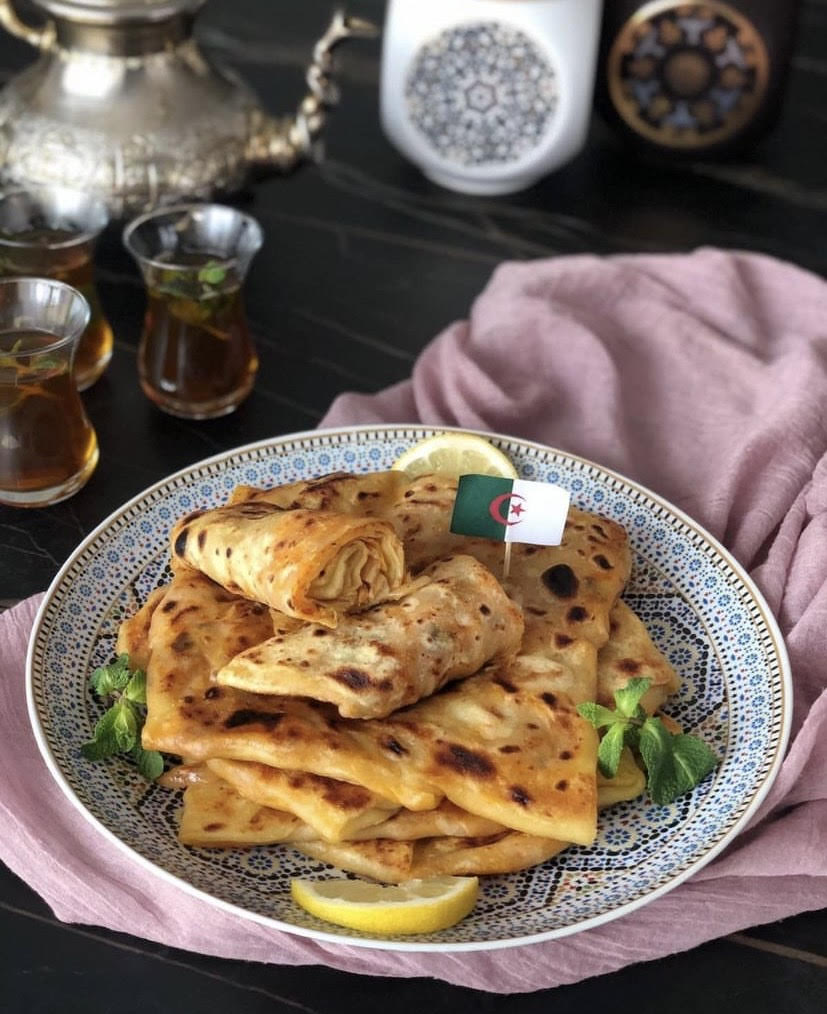
- Algerian mhadjeb served with traditional mint tea
- Alternative names: Mahjouba, Algerian crepes
- Type: Flatbread
- Place of origin: Algeria
- Variations: M'semen

Mahdjouba (Arabic: محجوبة) or mhadjeb is a crepe-like semolina based flatbread originating from Algeria.

A traditional Algerian dish, mhadjeb is a fine crepe-like semolina-based flatbread, typically stuffed with a mixture of onion, garlic, tomato, peppers and spices. It is very popular in all the regions of Algeria, including the southern regions such as Ouargla, Ghardaia, and Tamanrasset. It is one of the essential dishes offered in Algerian street foods. The mahdjouba, which means "covered" or "veiled" in Algerian Darja, originates from southern Algeria: Biskra, Touggourt. It is the vegetable-filled variation of m'semen, a traditional North African flatbread.

Regional variations of mahdjouba exist, in some regions, the filling includes meat or chicken, while in others, cheese and vegetables are used instead.

== Etymology ==
Mahdjouba in Algerian derja means veiled or hidden.

== See also ==
- Algerian cuisine
- Murtabak
- Hawawshi
- Fatayer
- Mughlai paratha
