= Humble pie =

English-language idiom

Propaganda poster using the threat of a "humble pie" to warn against food waste in the British food industry during World War II

The English idiom eat humble pie means to face humiliation and subsequently apologize for a serious mistake. It comes from humble pie, originally umble pie, a dish from medieval cuisine made from the edible internal organs (offal) of animals. This culinary tradition gave rise to the original expression "to eat umble pie".

The "umble" in the original dish name refers to these animal entrails, particularly from deer. During the Middle Ages, these less desirable animal parts, called "umbles", were typically consumed by lower classes. The word derived from numble, after the Middle French nombles, meaning "deer's innards".

The "pie" part refers to the pastry dish common in British cuisine since medieval times (when such pastry vessels were called "coffyns").

== Fossilized word ==
Although "umbles" and the modern word "humble" are not etymologically related, both words appeared with and without the initial "h" after the Middle Ages until the 19th century. Since the sound "h" is dropped in many dialects, the phrase was hypercorrected or changed due to folk etymology to "humble pie".

== See also ==
- Eating crow
