= Liber de Coquina =

Medieval cookbook

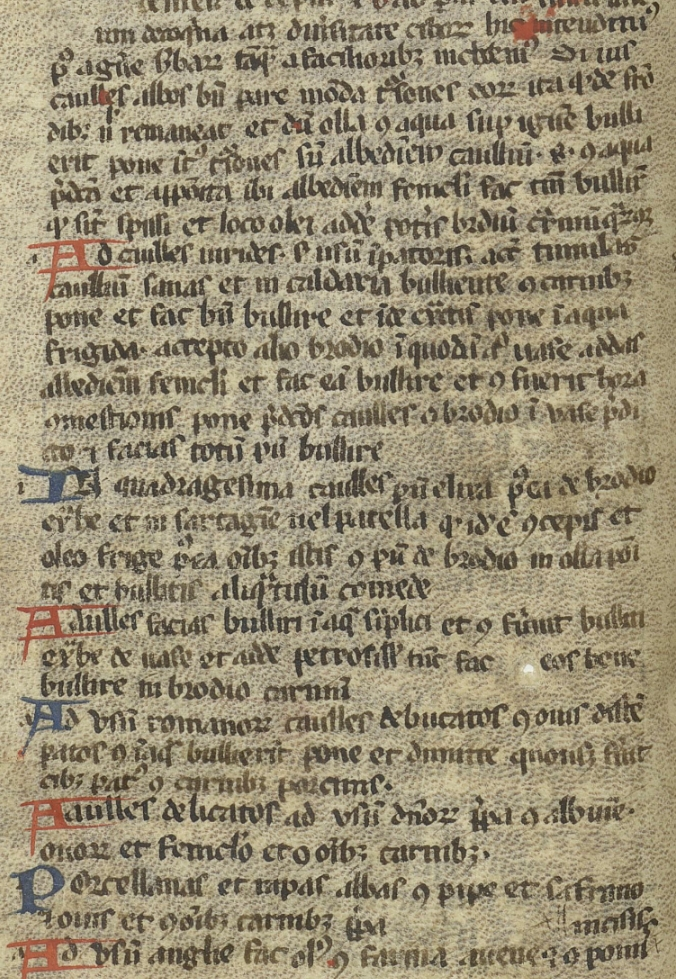
- Liber de Coquina (from Manuscript 7131)
- Author: Unknown
- Publication date: 13th–14th century

The Liber de Coquina ("The book of cooking/cookery") is one of the oldest medieval cookbooks. Two codices that contain the work survive from the beginning of the 14th century. Both are preserved at the Bibliothèque Nationale in Paris, France.

== Description ==
The text consists of two independent parts, mostly cited as Tractatus (part 1) and Liber de Coquina (part 2). The titles are taken from marginal notes by the medieval editor. While the identity of both the authors is unknown, it is believed that the Tractatus was originally written by a French author and the Liber de Coquina by an Italian author from the Naples area.

== Contents ==
=== Tractatus (part 1) ===
- wine compositions
- poultry and meat
- fish
- dishes for the rich
- legumes, eggs, leeks and gravy

=== Liber de Coquina (part 2) ===
- vegetables
- poultry
- pastry
- fish
- compositions of many ingredients

== Text ==
=== Manuscripts ===
- Latin manuscript 7131, fol. 94r-99v, Bibliothèque nationale, Paris (ca. 1304-1314)
- Latin manuscript 9328, fol. 129r-139v, Bibliothèque nationale, Paris (14th century)

=== Text edition ===
- Marianne Mulon: "Deux traités inédits d'art culinaire médiéval", Bull. philol. et hist. année 1968, vol 1, p. 369-435

=== Digital versions ===
The two parts are available at Thomas Gloning's site:

Tractatus de modo preparandi et condiendi omnia cibaria

- https://www.uni-giessen.de/de/fbz/fb05/germanistik/absprache/sprachverwendung/gloning/tx/mul1-tra.htm

Liber de coquina ubi diuersitates ciborum docentur

- https://www.uni-giessen.de/de/fbz/fb05/germanistik/absprache/sprachverwendung/gloning/tx/mul2-lib.htm

=== Translations ===
Complete Latin-German edition:

- Robert Maier (2005). Liber de Coquina: Das Buch der guten Küche. Friedrich. ISBN 978-3-937446-08-0.

Italian translation of the Tractatus:

- Enrico Carnevale Schianca (ed.): "Tractatus de modo preparandi et condiendi omnia cibaria", Appunti di Gastronomia n. 26, Condeco s.r.l. Editore, Milano 1998

== See also ==
- Medieval cuisine
- Apicius – a collection of Roman cookery recipes
- List of medieval cookbooks
  - Le Viandier – a recipe collection generally credited to Guillaume Tirel, c 1300
  - The Forme of Cury – a royal collection of medieval English recipes of the 14th century, influenced by the Liber de Coquina
