= Glossary of historical culinary terms =

A number of culinary terms and historical spellings of ingredients, foods and methods are no longer in common use.

== A ==
- Ale yeast: See barm.
- Amber: Used in the Middle East during the medieval period as an aphrodisiac, influencing later culinary use in Europe. It continued to be used in France into the early 19th century as an addition in hot chocolate.
- Amulet: An archaic spelling of omelette. Hannah Glasse gives an atypical recipe for the time that used only yolks, resembling what is understood today as custard.
- Animalized: A 19th-century term among vegetarians to reference the process of food being fed to animals to become animal protein. An example appears in an 1896 letter from Ellen G. White: "The diet of the animals is vegetables and grains. Must the vegetables be animalized, must they be incorporated into the system of animals, before we get them?"
- Anchovy: The term anchovy in The Art of Cookery Made Plain and Easy (1747) is ambiguous as to whether the fish referred to is an anchovy or a sprat.
- Appulmos: A pottage prepared in medieval Britain by cooking apples, straining them through a sieve, and combining the resulting purée with almond milk. Honey or sugar were sometimes added to provide sweetness.

== B ==
- Barm: A froth that is produced on the surface of beer as it ferments. British bakers used barm as a source of yeast until the 19th century when compressed yeast became widely available.
- Bason: Basin, used to refer to a large cooking pot.

== C ==
- Carowaies: A reference to the spice caraway. In the context of a 1591 recipe for chewettes, carowaies likely refers to biscuits flavored with caraway used as part of a filling.
- Chewette: A small pie filled with fruits, spices, and minced meat or fish. Alternative spellings include chewete, chewet, chawette, chuette, chuet, chuett, and chewit.
- Chocolattexos: Obsolete 18th-century term for chocolate pot.
- Codlin: In Britain historically a name for small, underripe apples, by the Elizabethan period it had become used to refer to small green apples which retained their shape when cooked.
- Comfit: A confection made by repeatedly coating nuts or seeds with a sugar syrup.
- Compost: A chilled preserve of fruit and vegetables, flavored with spices that was eaten in medieval Britain. It was often consumed in winter as a form of salad. In earlier versions, honey was added to provide sweetness, though by the 15th century a syrup of sugar and wine was used.
- Cury- Middle English for "cooking" (from the Old French queuerie, "cookery"), as seen in the historical cookbook The Forme of Cury

== D ==
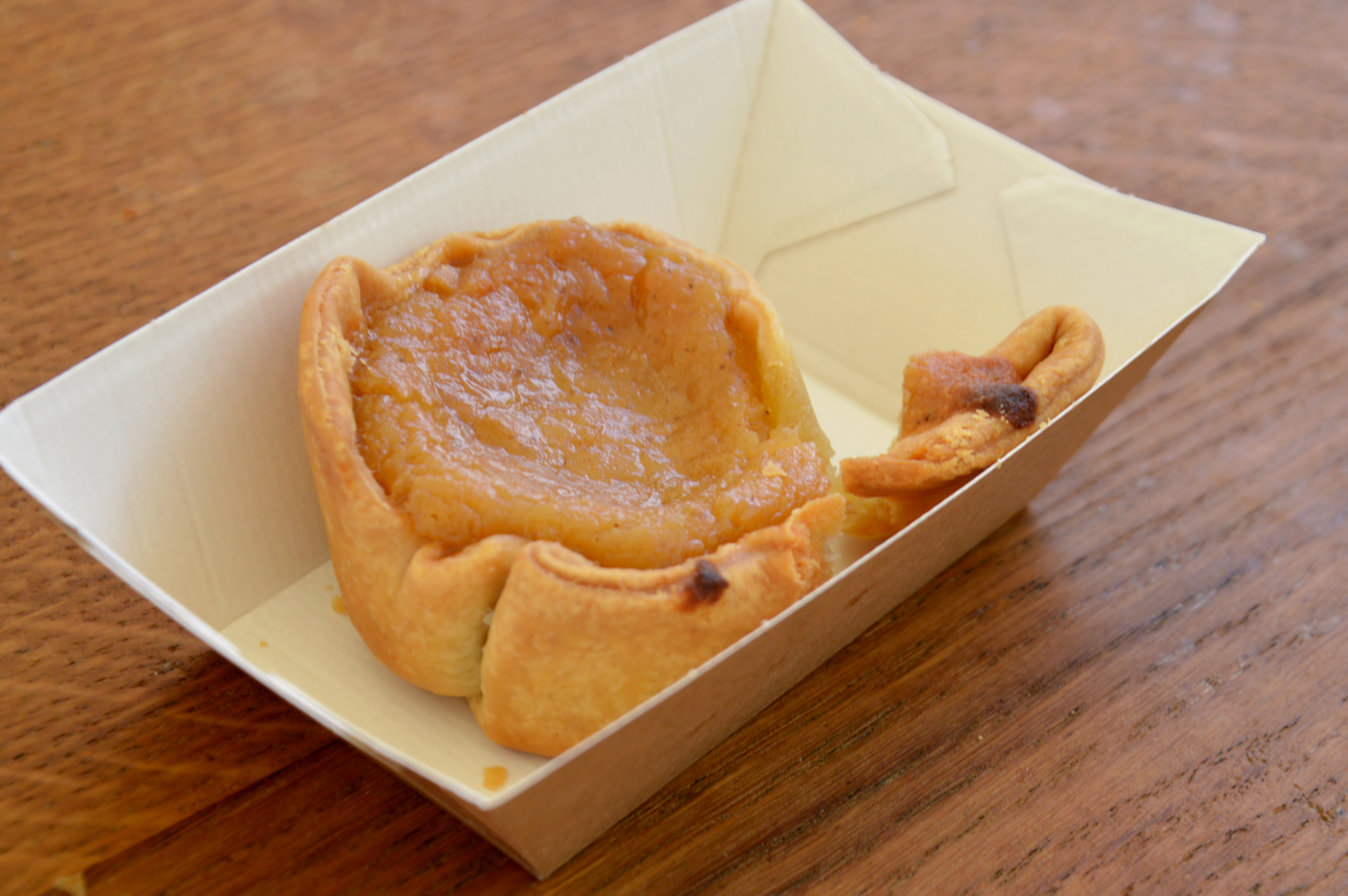
A dariole, prepared according to a 15th recipe.

- Dariole: Formerly a small pie containing a mixture of spices, and finely chopped herbs and meat. Now a culinary mold.
- Drawn: Strained, as in "drawn gravy" or "drawn gruel". "Drawn butter" is melted butter, and appears in the mid-19th century work of the American writer Catharine Beecher.
- Dowlet: A pie with small, carefully selected ingredients.

== E ==
- Emptins: See emptyings.
- Emptyings: The dregs left at the end of the brewing process, historically used in Britain as a source of yeast by bakers alongside barm.

== G ==
- Gigling iron: Pie crimper.

== H ==
- Hebolace: See herbelade.
- Herbelade: A pie filled with a mix of herbs and pork mince.
- Houacaca powder: Obsolete term for cocoa powder from Oaxaca, Mexico.

== L ==
- Leathercoats: Either a general term for russet apples or a name for a specific variety in the Elizabethan period. Alternatively spelled Leather coate.

== M ==
- Maize flower: Maize flour.

== N ==
- Nomblez: See numbles.
- Numbles: A cut of meat, though sources disagree about which animal and part it referred to. Also in French, appears in Le Ménagier de Paris (1393).

== P ==
- Pease: A singular form of the vegetable pea, or a dish made from them.
- Pennet: A pulled sugar confection, likely boiled at a low temperature with a powdery texture.
- Publisher: Entering the American vernacular at the end of the 18th century, it initially meant an American who published texts from Britain.
- Pye: Pie.

== S ==
- Searce: To sieve or sift.
- Seethe: Boil gently.
- Slops: An unappetising soup or other watery food.
- Spinage: Spinach.

== T ==
- Talemouse: A sometimes triangular form of cheesecake.

== V ==
- Vaunt: Type of fruit pie.

== See also ==
- History of food
- List of cooking techniques

== Sources ==
=== Primary ===
- A W (1591). A book of cokrye very necessary for all such as delight therein. London: Edward Allde.

=== Secondary ===
- Adams, Carol (2010) [1990]. The Sexual Politics of Meat. London: Continuum International Publishing Group. ISBN 978-1-4411-7328-7.
- Albala, Ken (2006). Cooking in Europe, 1250-1650. Westport, Connecticut: Greenwood Press. ISBN 0-313-33096-4.
- Campbell Franklin, Linda (1997). 300 Years of Kitchen Collectibles (4th ed.). Iowa, Wisconsin: Krause. ISBN 0-89689-1-12-7.
- Civitello, Linda (2017). Baking Powder Wars: The Cutthroat Food Fight that Revolutionized Cooking. Urbana, Illinois: University of Illinois Press. ISBN 978-0-252-04108-2.
- Clarkson, Janet (2009). Pie: A Global History. The Edible Series. London: Reaktion Books Ltd. ISBN 978-1-86189-425-0.
- Davidson, Alan (1995). "Glossary and Notes". "First Catch Your Hare ... ": The Art of Cookery Made Plain and Easy. Blackawton, Devon: Prospect Books. ISBN 978-1-903018-37-8.
- Eden, Trudy (2006). Cooking in America, 1590–1840. Westport, Connecticut: Greenwood Press. ISBN 0-313-33567-2.
- Greco, Gina L; Rose, Christine M (2009) [1393]. The Good Wife's Guide: Le Ménagies de Paris, A Medieval Household Book. Ithaca and London: Cornell University Press. ISBN 978-0-8014-4738-9.
- Grivetti, Louis Evan; Shapiro, Howard-Yana, eds. (2008). Chocolate: History, Culture, and Heritage. New Jersey: John Wiley & Sons, Inc. ISBN 978-0-470-41131-5.
- Livingston, Charles H (August 1960). "Middle English chewette, chawette". Romance Philology. 14 (1). JSTOR 44939150.
- Mason, Laura (2015). Goldstein, Darra (ed.). The Oxford Companion to Sugar and Sweets. Oxford: Oxford University Press. ISBN 978-0-199-31339-6.
- Stavely, Keith; Fitzgerald, Kathleen (2004). America's Founding Food: The Story of New England Cooking. Chapel Hill, North Carolina & London: The University of North Carolina Press. ISBN 0-8078-2894-7.
- Stavely, Keith; Fitzgerald, Kathleen (2011). Northern Hospitality: Cooking by the Book in New England. Amherst, Massachusetts: University of Massachusetts Press. ISBN 978-1-55849-860-0.
- Stavely, Keith W. F.; Fitzgerald, Kathleen (2011). Northern Hospitality: Cooking by the Book in New England. Amherst, Massachusetts: University of Massachusetts Press. ISBN 978-1-55849-860-0.Stavely, Keith; Fitzgerald, Kathleen (2017). United Tastes: The Making of the First American Cookbook. Amherst & Boston, Massachusetts: University of Massachusetts. ISBN 978-1-62534-322-2.
- Wilson, C Anne (1976) [1973]. Food & Drink in Britain: From the Stone Age to Recent Times. Harmondsworth, London: Penguin. ISBN 0-14-055-101-8.
