= Zodiac Club =

Entertainment venue in the United States

Coordinates: 40°37′30.5″N 75°27′29.4″W

The Zodiac Club was a 13,000-square-foot (1,200 m^{2}) live music venue located at 410 Allentown Drive in Allentown, Pennsylvania. Renamed Starz in April 1994, it was Lehigh Valley's premier venue for local and national bands. Dogged by a shooting outside the club and bankruptcy, the club closed in 1996. Some of the bands that performed at the venue included Green Day, Buddy Guy, Blue Öyster Cult, George Thorogood, Hootie & the Blowfish, Kansas, Joan Jett, Village People and Foghat.
