= Liber Cure Cocorum =

1430 English cookbook

Liber Cure Cocorum is an English cookbook dating from around the year 1430 and originating from County of Lancashire. Unusually for a cookbook, the recipes are written in rhyming verse.

== Text ==
It was first printed from a transcript made by Richard Morris in 1862 from a text in the Sloane Manuscript Collection (No.1986, British Museum, now British Library), found as an appendix to the "Boke of Curtasye". It is written in a Northern English dialect of the 15th century, probably not much earlier than the time of Henry VI. The author titles his work "The Slyghtes of Cure", or, in modern English, "The Art of Cookery".

== Content ==
The poem treats a great variety of dishes under the headings of potages, broths, roasted meats, baked meats, sauces and 'petecure', including the earliest references to several dishes, including haggis and humble pie.

== Sample recipe ==
Lamprayes in browet.

Take lamprayes and scalde hom by kynde,
Sythyn, rost hom on gredyl, and grynde
Peper and safrone; welle hit with alle,
Do þo lampreyes and serve hit in sale.

Translation:
Lampreys in broth.

Take lampreys and scald them by kind,
Then, roast them on griddle, and grind
Pepper and saffron; boil it withal,
Add the lampreys and serve it in hall.

== See also ==
- List of medieval cookbooks
