= Thomas Cogan (Tudor physician) =

English physician

Thomas Cogan (1545?–1607) was an English physician.

== Life ==
Cogan was born about 1546 at Chard, Somersetshire. He was educated at Oxford, graduated B.A. 1562-3, M.A. 1566, and M.B. 1574. He became fellow of Oriel in 1563. In 1574 he resigned his fellowship, and then (or in 1575) was appointed master of the Manchester grammar school. He practised as a physician at Manchester. Before 1586 he married Ellen, daughter of Sir Edmund Trafford, and widow of Thomas Willott, who had property in Manchester. In 1591-3 he was the family physician of Sir Richard Shuttleworth. In 1595 he presented Galen's works and other medical books to the library of Oriel, where they are still preserved. He resigned the schoolmastership before 1602, died in June 1607, and was buried on the 10th of that month in the church at Manchester. His will mentions property both in Somersetshire and Manchester, and bequeaths books to all the fellows and other officers of the college, and 4d. to each boy in the school. His widow died in December 1611.

== Works ==
His works are:

- The Well of Wisedome, containing Chiefe and Chosen Sayinges … gathered out of the Five Bootes of the Olde Testament …, 1577.
- The Haven of Health, made for the comfort of Students …,' 1584 (several later editions). With this was published A Preservative from the Pestilence, with a short censure of the late sickness at Oxford,
- Epistolarum familiarium M. T. Ciceronis epitome … (with an 'Epistle to all Schoolmasters,' the book being intended as an introduction to Latin).

Wood also mentions:

- Epistolæ item aliæ familiares Ciceronis,
- Orationes aliquot faciliores Ciceronis.
