= Nawal Nasrallah =

U.S.-based Iraqi writer, scholar, and translator

- Born: Baghdad, Iraq
- Education: University of Baghdad (MA)
- Occupations: Food writer, food historian, English literature scholar, translator

Nawal Nasrallah is a U.S.-based Iraqi food writer, food historian, English literature scholar, and translator from Arabic into English. She is best known for her cookbook featuring Iraqi cuisine, entitled Delights from the Garden of Eden, and for editions of medieval Arabic cookbooks, including Annals of the Caliphs’ Kitchens, an annotated translation of the tenth-century, Abbasid-era cookbook Kitab al-Tabikh by Ibn Sayyar al-Warraq. She has won numerous awards for her writing and her translations.

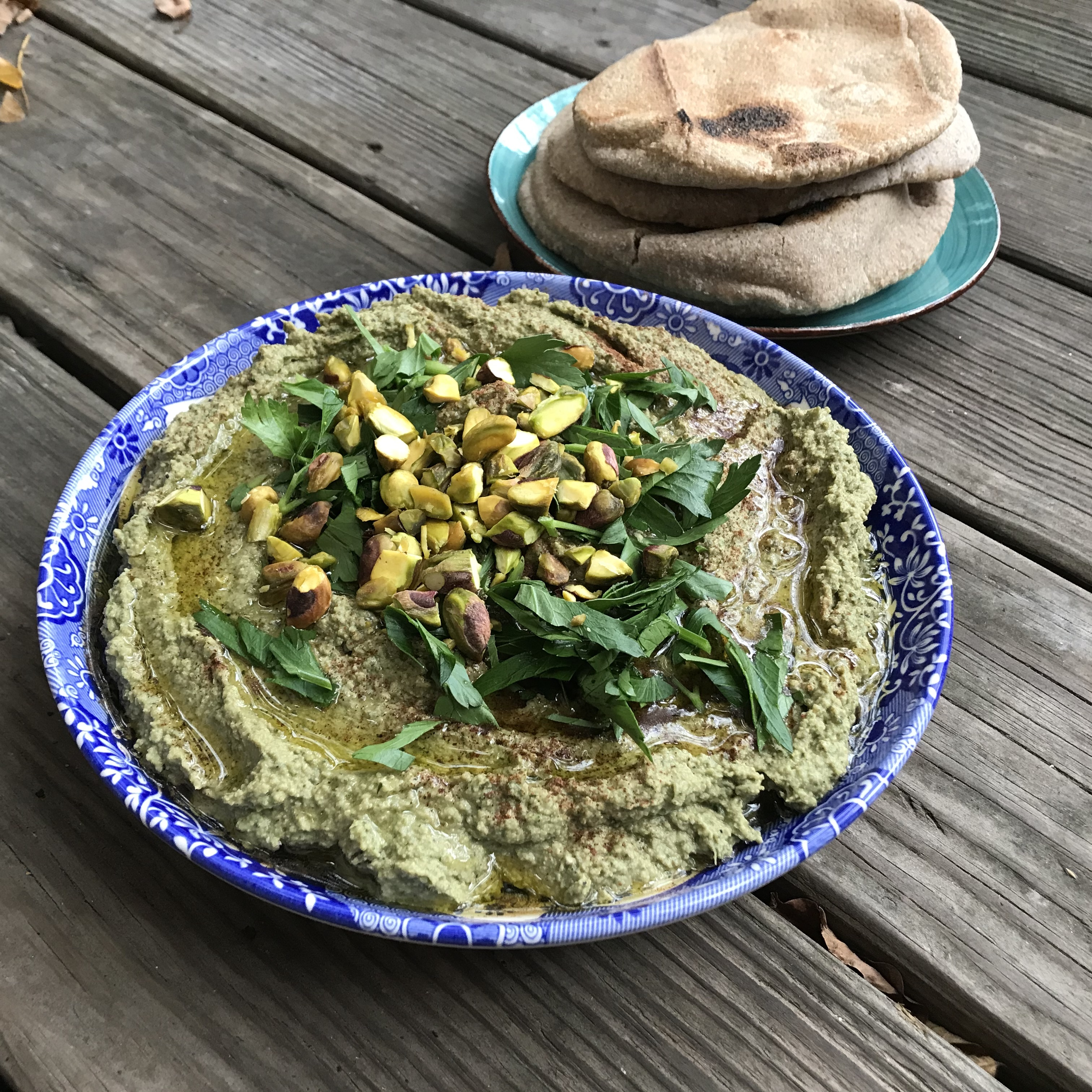
Medieval hummus, prepared according to a recipe from Nawal Nasrallah's blog.

== Life and career ==
Nawal Nasrallah was born in Baghdad. She studied at the University of Baghdad, where she earned her Masters of Arts degree in English and Comparative Literature and wrote a thesis comparing the eighteenth-century novel Robinson Crusoe by Daniel Defoe with the twelfth-century philosophical novel Hayy bin Yaqzan by the Andalusian philosopher and physician Ibn Tufail, showing how Ibn Tufail influenced Defoe’s work. The thesis was published in 1980.

Nasrallah taught English language, literature, and composition at the University of Baghdad and later the University of Mosul. In 1990 she moved to Bloomington, Indiana.

She became an avid baker and “culinary connoisseur” in Iraq, having taught herself to cook American foods while living in Mosul.

She released a cookbook of Iraqi cuisine, Delights from the Garden of Eden, in 2003 during the U.S. invasion of Iraq. At this time, there was increased American interest in Iraqi affairs. At the time, she reflected that, “as a wife, a mother, a woman, and a human being, I find in food and in memories of food my refuge, my comfort, and consolation when things are not looking good.”

Working with Harvard professor Gojko Barjamovic in 2015, Nasrallah compiled recipes based on what is known of the ancient Mesopotamian diet and cuisine and organized a banquet for scholars at Harvard's Semitic Museum. She also taught a seminar on Iraqi cuisine at the University of Gastronomic Sciences in Italy in 2016.

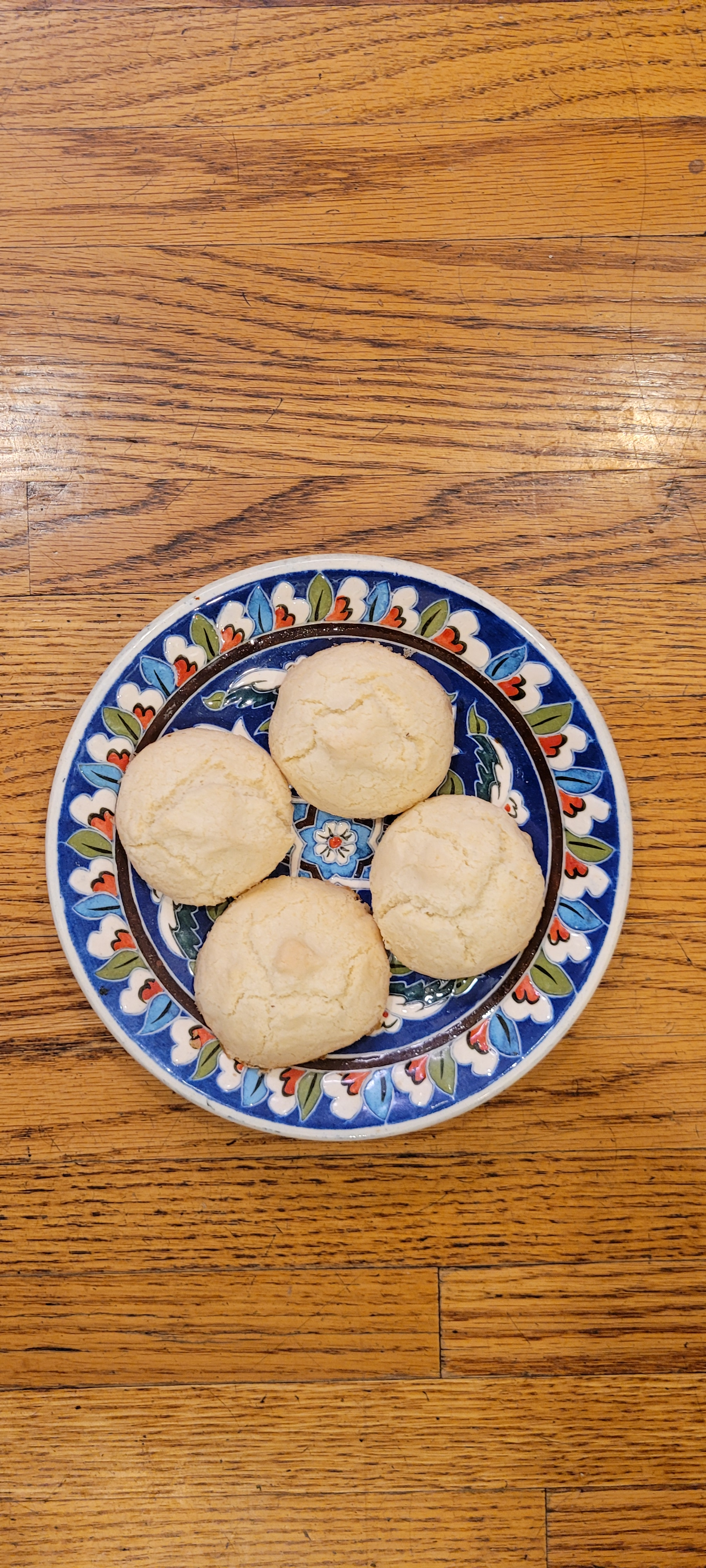
Almond cookies, made according to a 14th-century recipe from Mamluk Egypt presented on Nawal Nasrallah's blog

Nasrallah also published recipes for perfumes, spices, and oils. In her book Treasure Trove of Benefits and Variety at the Table, she translated over 750 fourteenth-century, Mamluk-era recipes from Egypt, with commentary and analysis, including Mamluk-era views about food's curative and regenerative powers based on Galenic theory.

== Cooking ==
Nasrallah published her Iraqi cookbook, Delights from the Garden of Eden, in 2003. It contains more than four hundred recipes, and won the Gourmand World Cookbook Awards in 2007. She also offers historical insights on Iraqi food, and stories and information about the regions of Iraq from which the recipes come. The book received positive reviews. Nasrallah described one of her motivations for writing the cookbook as filling an academic gap in literature on Iraqi food and food history, at a time when U.S. media representations of Iraq were primarily negative.

An abridged version of Delights from the Garden of Eden was published in 2013. Saveur magazine ranked it as one of the top ten best cookbooks of 2013.

Nasrallah has participated in multiple interviews and panels on food and history on YouTube, and regularly updates her blog on medieval Arabic recipes. The New York Times featured her thirteenth-century recipe for "Medieval Hummus" in 2023.

== Scholarly works ==
Nasrallah is an expert on medieval Arab cuisine, on the literary culture of Arabic cookbooks, and on the cuisines of modern Iraq and its historical precursors, including ancient Mesopotamia. She has also prepared language learning materials for Iraqi colloquial Arabic.

In 2007, Nasrallah translated the earliest surviving Arabic cookbook, Kitab al-tabikh (“The Book of Cooking”) attributed to the tenth-century writer variously known as Ibn al-Warraq or as Ibn Sayyar al-Warraq. Her edition draws upon versions of the manuscript that survive in Oxford, Helsinki, and Istanbul. In 2008, she won an honorable mention in adult non-fiction from the Arab American National Museum for it. The cookbook combines recipes that its author, a courtier in the Abbasid Caliphate centered in Baghdad, drew from more than twenty other cookbooks to which he had access. Scholars have drawn upon this edition not only for insights into what elites may have eaten, but also for how cooks may have prepared and served the food in terms of utensils and ceramics, with implications for Islamic-era archaeological research.

In 2011, Nasrallah published Dates: A Global History, which explores the historical, nutritional, cultural, and symbolic value of dates in the Middle East and beyond, while also describing its anatomy, nomenclature, cultivation, and cultural associations. The book illuminates the various legends associated with dates throughout history, such as the Greek myth of the date palm’s connection to the phoenix, which influenced the botanical naming of the date palm as Phoenix dactylifera.

In 2017, Nasrallah translated and published an edition of a fourteenth-century Mamluk-era cookbook from Egypt. Known in Arabic as Kanz al-fawāʾid fī tanwīʿ al-mawāʾid, the book appeared in her English edition as Treasure Trove of Benefits and Variety at the Table. In this volume, Nasrallah also included adaptations of some of these fourteenth-century recipes for modern kitchens.

More recently, in 2019, Nawal Nasrallah contributed to a volume about ancient Mesopotamian texts in Yale University’s Babylonian collection, while citing recipes recorded on cuneiform tablets.

Nasrallah's 2021 translation into English of Best of Delectable Foods and Dishes from al-Andalus and al-Maghrib: A Cookbook by Thirteenth-Century Andalusi Scholar Ibn Razīn al-Tujībī (1227–1293) was shortlisted for the 2022 Sheikh Zayed Book Award in the Translation category. She won the award in 2026 for her translation of a 13th century Arabic text into English.
