= The Forme of Cury =

14th century English guide to cooking

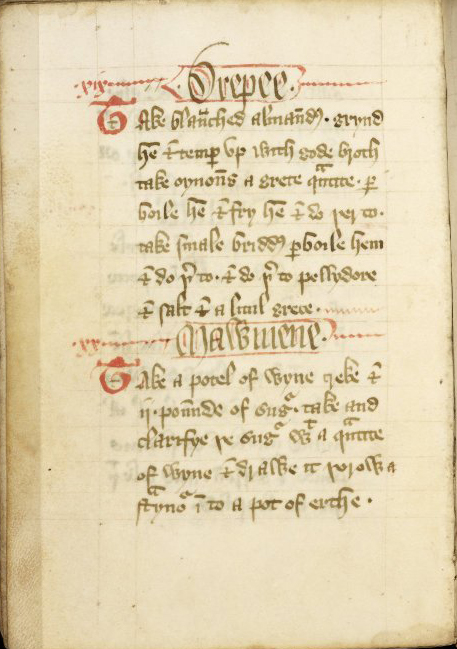
- A page from a late 14th-century manuscript with recipes for "drepee", parboiled birds with almonds and fried onions, and "mawmenee", a sweet stew of capon or pheasant with spices, dates, and pine nuts, coloured with sandalwood (Note: The page offers recipes for "Drepee": Take blanched Almandes grynde hem and temper hem up with gode broth take Oynouns a grete quantite parboyle hem and frye hem and do þerto. take smale bryddes parboyle hem and do þerto Pellydore and salt. and a lytel grece. and "Mawmenee": Take a pottel of wyne greke. and ii. pounde of sugur take and clarifye the sugur with a qantite of wyne an drawe it thurgh a straynour in to a pot of erthe take flour of Canell. and medle with sum of the wyne an cast to gydre. take pynes with Dates and frye hem a litell in grece oþer in oyle and cast hem to gydre. take clowes an flour of canel hool and cast þerto. take powdour gyngur. canel. clower, colour it with saundres a lytel yf hit be nede cast salt þerto. and lat it seeþ; warly with a slowe fyre and not to thyk, take brawn of Capouns yteysed. oþer of Fesauntes teysed small and cast þerto.)
- Author: The master cooks of King Richard II
- Translator: Samuel Pegge
- Language: Middle English
- Subject: Cookery
- Publisher: Richard II of England
- Publication date: c. 1390
- Publication place: England

The Forme of Cury (The Method of Cooking, cury from Old French queuerie, "cookery") is an extensive 14th-century collection of medieval English recipes, written in Middle English. Although the original manuscript is lost, the text appears in nine manuscripts, the most famous in the form of a scroll with a headnote citing it as the work of "the chief Master Cooks of King Richard II". The name The Forme of Cury is generally used for the family of recipes rather than any single manuscript text. It is among the oldest extant English cookery books. The book contains the earliest known recipe for macaroni and cheese.

== Context ==
The collection was named The Forme of Cury by Samuel Pegge, who published an edition of one of the manuscripts in 1780 for a trustee of the British Museum, Gustavus Brander. It is one of the best-known medieval guides to cooking. The Forme of Cury may have been written partly to compete with Le Viandier of Taillevent, a French cookery book created at about the same time.

== Approach ==
In the preamble, the authors explain that the recipes are meant to teach a cook how to make common dishes and unusual or extravagant banquet dishes. They note that the recipes were written with the advice of the best experts in medicine and philosophy.

Spices were included to impart rich colouring to the finished dishes for the purpose of, as Pegge says, "gratifying the sight". There is a particular emphasis on yellows, reds and greens, but gilding and silvering were used in several of the recipes. Yellow was achieved with saffron or egg yolk, red with "sanders" (sandalwood) or alkanet, and green often with minced parsley. There are recipes for preparing many types of meat, including from birds such as crane, curlew, and heron, and marine mammals such as porpoise, seal, and whale. There are about ten vegetable recipes, including one for a vinaigrette salad, which indicates influence from Europe. Pasta dishes imply influence from Italy.

Some recipes in The Forme of Cury appear to have been influenced by the Liber de Coquina, which had contributions from Arabic cuisine. For example, the recipe for mawmenee corresponds to the Arabic mamuniyya (a rich semolina pudding). Sicilian influence appears in the confectionery-like payn ragoun, involving the Arab-influenced technique of cooking soft balls in syrup.

== Sample recipes ==
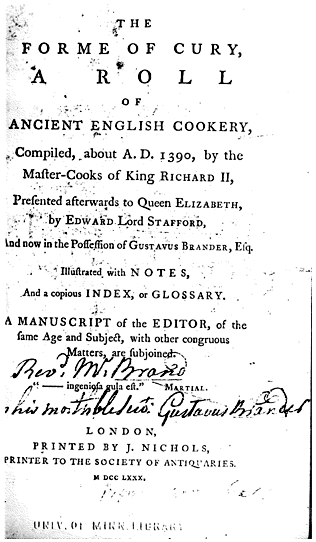
Title page of Samuel Pegge's 1780 version, the first printed edition

=== Sawse madame ===
Sawse madame. Take sawge, persel, ysope and saueray, quinces and peeres, garlek and grapes, and fylle the gees þerwith; and sowe the hole þat no grece come out, and roost hem wel, and kepe the grece þat fallith þerof. Take galytyne and grece and do in a possynet. Whan the gees buth rosted ynouh, take hem of & smyte hem on pecys, and take þat þat is withinne and do it in a possynet and put þerinne wyne, if it be to thyk; do þerto powdour of galyngale, powdour douce, and salt and boyle the sawse, and dresse þe gees in disshes & lay þe sowe onoward.

In modern English:

Sauce Madame. Take sage, parsley, hyssop and savory, quinces and pears, garlic and grapes, and stuff the geese with them, and sew the hole so that no dripping comes out, and roast them well and keep the dripping that falls from them. Take bread sauce and dripping and place in a cooking-pot. When the geese are roasted enough, take them off and chop them in pieces, and take what is within and put it in a cooking-pot and put in wine if it is too thick. Add to it powder of galangal, powder-douce and salt, and boil the sauce and dress the geese in dishes and lay the sauce on.

=== Makerouns ===
The Forme of Cury contains a cheese and pasta casserole known as makerouns, the earliest recipe for what is now known as macaroni and cheese. It was made with fresh, hand-cut pasta which was sandwiched between a mixture of melted butter and cheese. The recipe given (in Middle English) was:

Take and make a thynne foyle of dowh. and kerve it on pieces, and cast hem on boiling water & seeþ it well. take chese and grate it and butter cast bynethen and above as losyns. and serue forth.

In modern English:

Make a thin sheet of dough and cut it in pieces. Place them in boiling water and boil them well. Take cheese and grate it and add it and place butter beneath and above as with losyns [a dish similar to lasagne], and serve.

== Influences ==
The book is influenced by the cuisine of several different countries. The book's relatively few vegetable and salad recipes indicate influence from the era's Spanish cuisine and Portuguese cuisine. Its pasta recipes are influenced by Italian cuisine. Some of the book's recipes and the syrup cooking techniques are based on Arabic cuisine, probably via Sicily.

== Modern recreations ==
The Café at the Rylands, in Manchester's John Rylands Library where the manuscript is kept, cooked Tart in Ymber Day, Compast, Payn Puff, Frumenty and Gingerbrede, accompanied by Piment (spiced wine), for invited guests in 2009.

== See also ==
- Apicius – a collection of Roman cookery recipes
- Le Viandier – a 14th-century French cookbook
- Liber de Coquina – a 14th-century cookbook of Italian and French origin
- List of medieval cookbooks
- Utilis Coquinario – a 14th-century Middle English cookbook

== Bibliography ==
- Hieatt, Constance B.; Butler, Sharon, eds. (1985). Curye on Inglysch: English culinary manuscripts of the fourteenth century (including the Forme of cury). Early English Text Society. London: Oxford University Press. ISBN 978-0-19-722409-0. (modern critical edition)
- Hieatt, Constance B. (1988). "Further notes on The Forme of Cury et al.: additions and corrections". Bulletin of the John Rylands Library. 70 (1): 45–52. doi:10.7227/BJRL.70.1.4. Archived from the original on 29 September 2020.
