= Han Hui-sun =

Last Joseon kitchen court lady (1889–1972)

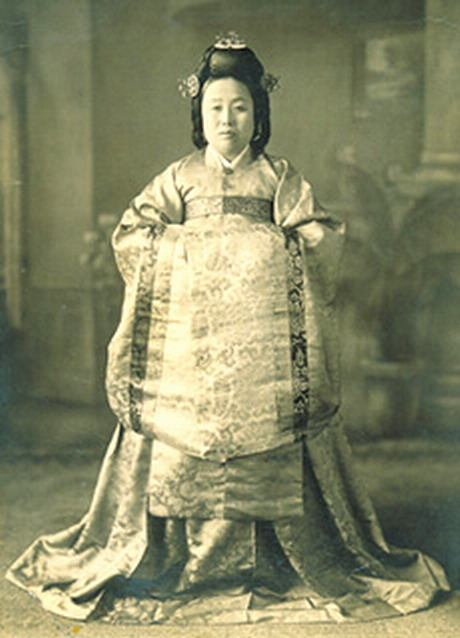

Han Hui-sun (Korean: 한희순; Hanja: 韓熙順; 1889 – January 5, 1972) was the last kitchen court lady in the Joseon period. She played an important role in reviving Korean royal court cuisine, which had been dying out and which she also modernized. She was designated as Important Intangible Cultural Asset No.38: Korean Royal Court Cuisine First Artisan by the government of South Korea in 1971.

== Biography ==
Han Hui-sun was born in Seoul in 1889 (also referred to as the 26th year of Gojong of the Korean Empire). She became Gungnyeo of Deoksugung kitchen at the age of 13 in 1901. After that, she held positions at the palaces Gyeongbokgung and Changdeokgung, and as a kitchen court lady, she was in charge of cuisine of Gojong and Sunjong. She held that position until 1965, serving Sunjong's Empress Sunjeong.

In 1957, she published the House of Yi Court Cuisine Notice (이조궁정요리통고; 李朝宮廷料理通攷; Ijo gungjeongyori tonggo), a joint work written with Hwang Hye-seong. She gave lectures for teaching how to cook at Sookmyung Women's University from 1955 to 1967. Hwang Hye-seong and Yeom Cho-ae were her disciples.

== Works ==
=== House of Yi Court Cuisine Notice ===
House of Yi Court Cuisine Notice (이조궁정요리통고; 李朝宮廷料理通攷; Ijo gungjeongyori tonggo) was a book that comprehensively discussed different court cuisine recipes. The book contained 49 dishes made from beef, 8 dishes made from pork or Siberian roe deer (called noru in Korean), 14 dishes made from chicken or raw common pheasant (called kkwong in Korean), 39 dishes made from clams or fish, 88 dishes made from vegetables or seafood, 52 dishes from grains, and 49 dishes for dessert, and it also included how to make tofu, and basic seasoning. The book was influential in listing court cuisines as a National intangible heritage.

== See also ==
- Hwang Hye-seong
- Han Bok-ryeo
- Yoon Sook-ja
- Suunjapbang
- Domundaejak
