= Cookbook =

Book of recipes with instructions

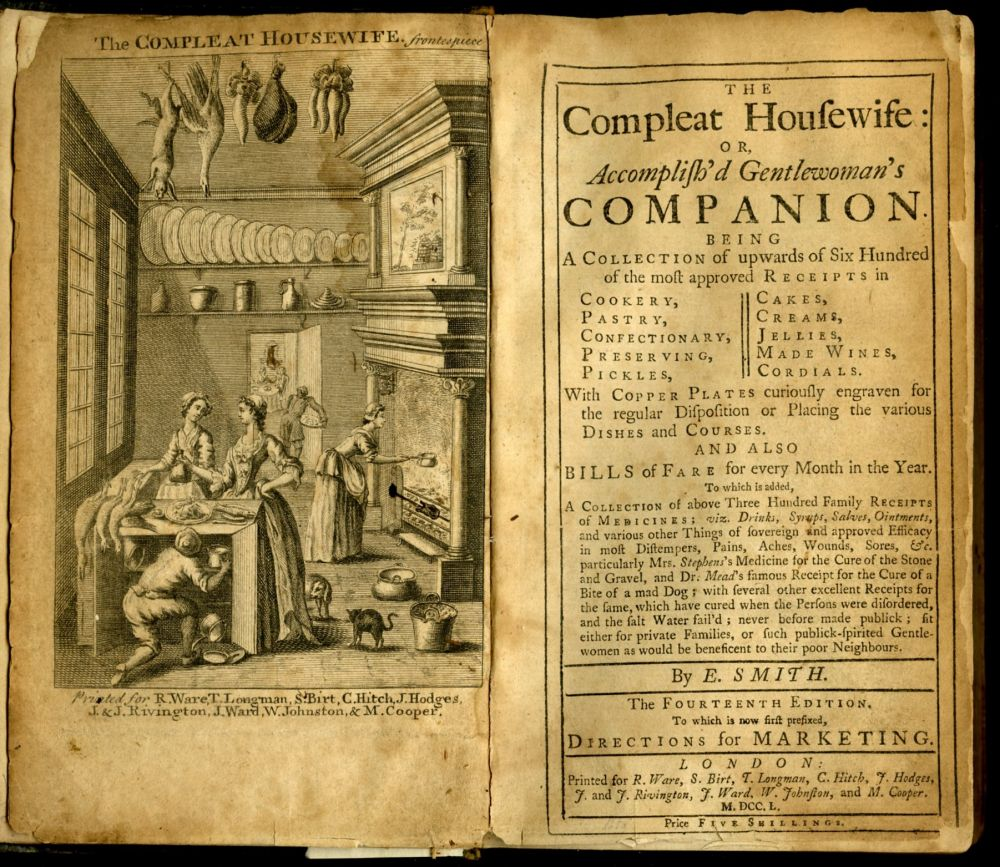
Eliza Smith's The Compleat Housewife, 1727

A cookbook or cookery book is a culinary reference work that contains a collection of recipes and instructions for food preparation. Cookbooks serve as comprehensive guides that may include cooking techniques, ingredient information, nutritional data, and cultural context related to culinary practices. Cookery books can be general-purpose, covering a wide range of recipes and methods, or specialized, focusing on specific cuisines, dietary restrictions, cooking methods, specific ingredients, or a target audience. They may also explore historical periods or cultural movements.

Cookery books are written by professional chefs, food writers, cooking instructors, cultural historians, collective organizations like community groups or charities, or as anonymous compilations of regional or historical traditions. They target home cooks seeking everyday guidance, professional culinary staff needing standardized recipes, institutional food service personnel, culinary students, or specialized practitioners like bakers or dietary professionals.

== Format ==
Recipes are usually systematically organized by course sequence (appetizers, soups, main courses, side dishes, desserts, beverages), primary ingredient (meat, poultry, seafood, vegetables, grains, dairy), cooking technique (roasting, sautéing, braising, steaming, fermenting), alphabetical arrangement for quick reference, geographic or cultural origins highlighting regional or ethnic traditions, seasonal availability, or difficulty level, ranging from beginner-friendly to advanced techniques.

While western cookbooks usually group recipes for main courses by the main ingredient of the dishes, Japanese cookbooks usually group them by cooking techniques (e.g., fried foods, steamed foods, and grilled foods). Both styles of cookbook have additional recipe groupings such as soups or sweets.

The cookbook format has evolved significantly from ancient recipe collections to modern multimedia publications, reflecting changes in cooking technology, ingredient availability, cultural exchange, and educational approaches to culinary arts. Contemporary cookbooks increasingly integrate digital components, video tutorials, and interactive elements to enhance traditional text-based instruction.

== Types of cookbooks ==
Betty Crocker's Cook Book for Boys and Girls, 1957

Cookbooks that serve as basic kitchen references (sometimes known as "kitchen bibles") began to appear in the early modern period. They provided not just recipes but overall instruction for both kitchen technique and household management. Such books were written primarily for housewives and occasionally domestic servants as opposed to professional cooks, and at times books such as The Joy of Cooking (United States), La bonne cuisine de Madame E. Saint-Ange (France), The Art of Cookery (UK, U.S.), Il cucchiaio d'argento (Italy), and A Gift to Young Housewives (Russia) have served as references of record for national cuisines.

Cookbooks also tell stories of the writers themselves and reflect upon the era in which they are written. They often reveal notions of social, political, environmental or economic contexts. For example, during the era of industrialization, convenience foods were brought into many households and were integrated and present in cookbooks written in this time. Related to this class are instructional cookbooks, which combine recipes with in-depth, step-by-step recipes to teach beginning cooks basic concepts and techniques. In vernacular literature, people may collect traditional recipes in family cookbooks.

Cookbooks can also be considered primary historical sources for historians, as they provide clues not only about the culinary techniques and ingredients of an era, but also about broader themes such as gender roles, social structures, cultural identities, and even religious and political ideologies.

Instructional approaches vary between didactic styles, offering detailed step-by-step instructions, explanations of cooking principles, troubleshooting guides, and progressive skill-building, and reference styles, providing concise ingredient lists, precise measurements, brief preparation summaries, and quick-reference formats for experienced cooks.

=== Early works ===
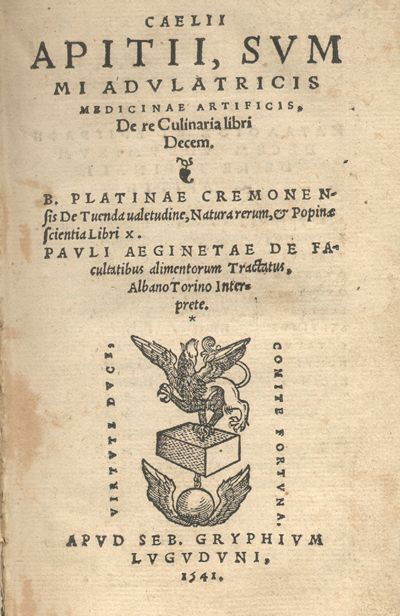
Apicius, De re coquinaria, an early collection of Roman recipes

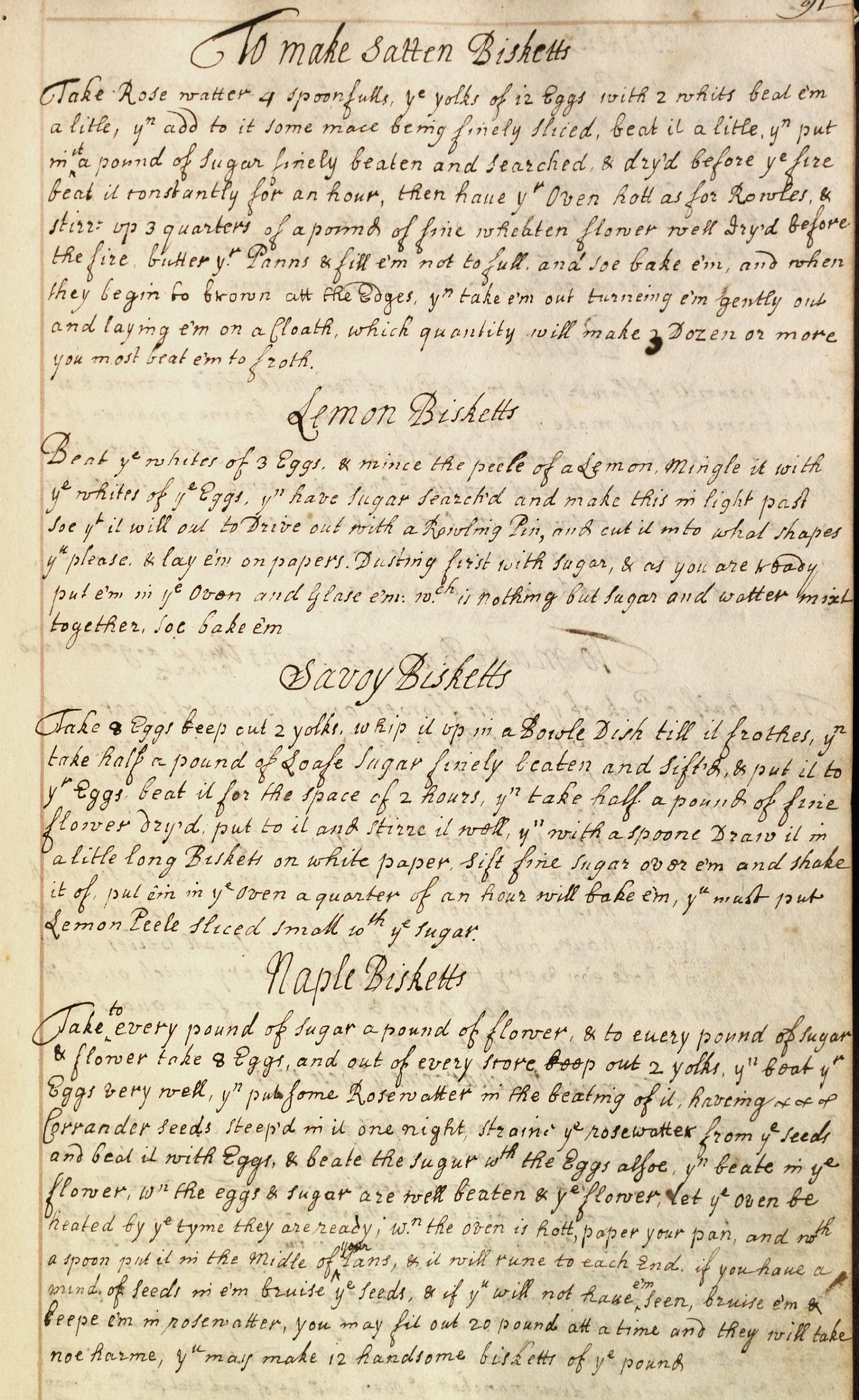
18th-century recipes for biscuits from a private collection of recipes

Not all cultures left written records of their culinary practices, but some examples have survived, notably three Akkadian tablets from Ancient Mesopotamia, dating to about 1700 BC, large fragments from Archestratus, the Latin Apicius and some texts from the Tang dynasty.

The earliest collection of recipes that has survived in Europe is De re coquinaria, written in Latin. An early version was first compiled sometime in the 1st century and has often been attributed to the Roman gourmet Marcus Gavius Apicius, though this has been cast in doubt by modern research. An Apicius came to designate a book of recipes. The current text appears to have been compiled in the late 4th or early 5th century; the first print edition is from 1483. It records a mix of ancient Greek and Roman cuisine, but with few details on preparation and cooking.

An abbreviated epitome entitled Apici Excerpta a Vinidario, a "pocket Apicius" by Vinidarius, "an illustrious man", was made in the Carolingian era. In spite of its late date it represents the last manifestation of the cuisine of Antiquity.

=== American cookbooks ===
In 1742, Eliza Smith's The Compleat Housewife; or, Accomplished Gentlewoman's Companion was published in North America. This work was not an original North American text but instead a copy of an English cookbook. In 1796, the first known American cookbook, titled American Cookery, written by Amelia Simmons, was published in Hartford, Connecticut. Until then, the cookbooks printed and used in the Thirteen Colonies were British. The scarcity of American culinary literature may have been due to the fact that many women in those days were illiterate.

=== Arabic ===
The earliest cookbooks known in Arabic are those of al-Warraq, Kitāb al-Ṭabīkh (an early 10th-century compendium of recipes from the 9th and 10th centuries) and al-Baghdadi (13th century).

=== Indian ===
Manasollasa from India contains recipes of vegetarian and non-vegetarian cuisines. While the text is not the first among Indian books to describe fermented foods, it contains a range of cuisines based on fermentation of cereals and flours.

=== Chinese ===
Chinese recipe books are known from the Tang dynasty, but most were lost. One of the earliest surviving Chinese-language cookbooks is "Madame Wu's" Wushi Zhongkuilu from the late 13th century and Hu Sihui's "Yinshan Zhengyao" (Important Principles of Food and Drink), believed to be from 1330. Hu Sihui, Buyantu Khan's dietitian and therapist, recorded a Chinese-inflected Central Asian cuisine as eaten by the Yuan court; his recipes were adapted from foods eaten all over the Mongol Empire. In 1792, Yuan Mei published Recipes from the Garden of Contentment, which criticized the corruption of Chinese cuisine by the Manchu.

=== Korean ===
Sanga yorok was written in 1459 by the physician Jeon Soon. It is the oldest Korean cookbook, found thus far.

Ŭmsik timibang, written around 1670 by Chang Kyehyang, is the oldest Korean cookbook first written by a woman.

=== European ===
After a long interval, the first recipe books to be compiled in Europe since Late Antiquity started to appear in the late thirteenth century. About a hundred are known to have survived, some fragmentary, from the age before printing. The earliest genuinely medieval recipes have been found in a Danish manuscript dating from around 1300, which in turn are copies of older texts that date back to the early 13th century or perhaps earlier.

Low and High German manuscripts are among the most numerous. Among them is Daz buch von guter spise ("The Book of Good Food") written c. 1350 in Würzberg and Kuchenmeysterey ("Kitchen Mastery"), the first printed German cookbook from 1485. Two French collections are probably the most famous: Le Viandier ("The Provisioner") was compiled in the late 14th century by Guillaume Tirel, master chef for two French kings; and Le Ménagier de Paris ("The Householder of Paris"), a household book written by an anonymous middle-class Parisian in the 1390s. Du fait de cuisine is another Medieval French cookbook, written in 1420.

From Southern Europe there is the 14th century Valencian manuscript Llibre de Sent Soví (1324), the Catalan Llibre de totes maneres de potatges de menjar ("The book of all recipes of dishes") and several Italian collections, notably the Venetian mid-14th century Libro per Cuoco, with its 135 recipes alphabetically arranged. The printed De honesta voluptate et valetudine ("On honourable pleasure"), first published in 1475, is one of the first cookbooks based on Renaissance ideals, and, though it is as much a series of moral essays as a cookbook, has been described as "the anthology that closed the book on medieval Italian cooking".

Medieval English cookbooks include The Forme of Cury and Utilis Coquinario, both written in the fourteenth century. The Forme of Cury is a cookbook authored by the chefs of Richard II. Utilis Coquinario is a similar cookbook though written by an unknown author. Another English manuscript (1390s) includes the earliest recorded recipe for ravioli, even though ravioli did not originate in England.

=== International and ethnic ===
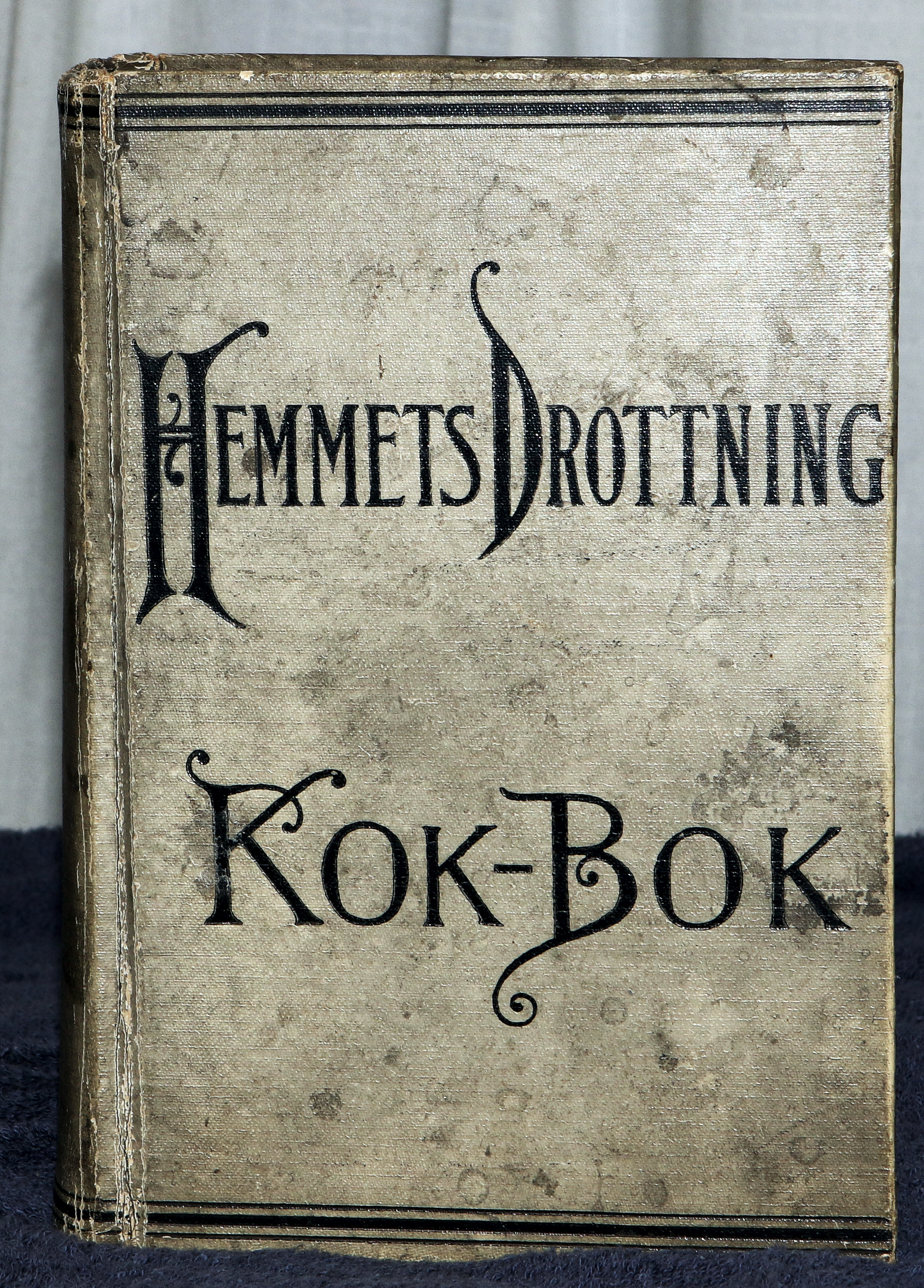
Norwegian immigrant cookbook in Norwegian, published in the United States in 1899

International and ethnic cookbooks fall into two categories: the kitchen references of other cultures, translated into other languages; and books translating the recipes of another culture into the languages, techniques, and ingredients of a new audience. The latter style often doubles as a sort of culinary travelogue, giving background and context to a recipe that the first type of book would assume its audience is already familiar with. Popular Puerto Rican cookbook, Cocina Criolla, written by Carmen Aboy Valldejuli, includes recipes that are typically of traditional Puerto Rican cuisine such as mofongo and pasteles. Valldejuli's cookbook was not only important to Puerto Ricans, but also very popular in the United States where her original cookbook has since been published in several editions, including English versions. These include The Art of Caribbean Cookery - Doubleday, 1957; Puerto Rican Cookery - Pelican Publishing, 1983; and, Juntos en la Cocina (co-authored with her husband, Luis F. Valldejuli) - Pelican Publishing, 1986.

=== The rise of the modern cookbook ===
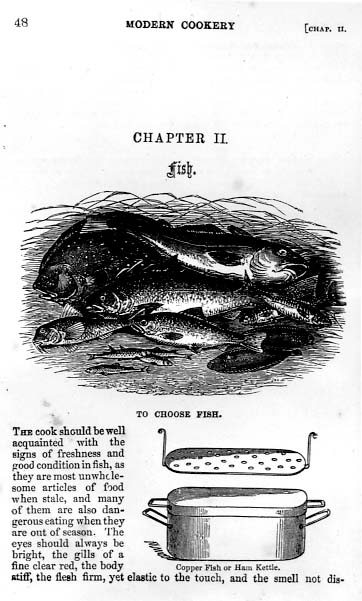
from Modern Cookery for Private Families by Eliza Acton (London: Longmans, Green, Reader, and Dyer, 1871, p. 48)

With the advent of the printing press in the 16th and 17th centuries, numerous books were written on how to manage households and prepare food. In Holland and England competition grew between the noble families as to who could prepare the most lavish banquet. By the 1660s, cookery had progressed to an art form and good cooks were in demand. Many of them published their own books detailing their recipes in competition with their rivals. Many of these books have now been translated and are available online.

By the 19th century, the Victorian preoccupation for domestic respectability brought about the emergence of cookery writing in its modern form. The first modern cookery writer and compiler of recipes for the home was Eliza Acton. Her pioneering cookbook, Modern Cookery for Private Families (1845), was aimed at the domestic reader rather than the professional cook or chef. This was an immensely influential book, and it established the format for modern writing about cookery. The publication introduced the now-universal practice of listing the ingredients and suggested cooking times with each recipe. It included the first recipe for Brussels sprouts. Contemporary chef Delia Smith is quoted as having called Acton "the best writer of recipes in the English language". Modern Cookery long survived her, remaining in print until 1914 and available more recently in facsimile reprint.

Acton's work was an important influence on Isabella Beeton, who published Mrs Beeton's Book of Household Management in 24 monthly parts between 1857 and 1861. The book was a guide to running a Victorian household, with advice on fashion, child care, animal husbandry, poisons, the management of servants, science, religion, and industrialism. Despite its title, most of the text consisted of recipes, such that another popular name for the volume is Mrs Beeton's Cookbook. Most of the recipes were illustrated with coloured engravings, and it was the first book to show recipes in a format that is still used today. Many of the recipes were plagiarised from earlier writers, including Acton.

In 1885 the Virginia Cookery Book was published by Mary Stuart Smith. In 1896 the American cook Fannie Farmer (1857–1915) published The Boston Cooking-School Cook Book which contained some 1,849 recipes.

During the middle ages, cookbooks often included instructions on slaughtering livestock and plucking poultry. Along with that, the spread of germs and bacteria was a significant concern. This led to cookbooks providing guidance on how to practice good hygiene while cooking. Beyond actual culinary preparation instructions, earlier cookbooks occasionally included personal observations or notes from the author. For instance, in 1584, an Italian chef recorded his suspicions regarding his servants stealing from him and noted how he needed to supervise them. Similarly, in 1668, Italian Chef Francesco Liberati included a list of specific reasons as to why cooks should abstain from alcohol in his household cookbook.

Modern cookbooks extend beyond recipes, incorporating visual elements like step-by-step photographs, finished dish presentations, ingredient identification guides, and equipment demonstrations. They provide technical information, including detailed cooking techniques, kitchen equipment recommendations, ingredient selection, storage, substitution guides, food safety protocols, and nutritional data. Additionally, they offer cultural and educational context through historical backgrounds, cultural significance, regional variations, chef biographies, culinary philosophy, and sustainable seasonal cooking principles.

=== Professional cookbooks ===
Professional cookbooks are designed for the use of working chefs and culinary students and sometimes double as textbooks for culinary schools. Such books deal not only in recipes and techniques, but often service and kitchen workflow matters. Many such books deal in substantially larger quantities than home cookbooks, such as making sauces by the liter or preparing dishes for large numbers of people in a catering setting. While the most famous of such books today are books like Le guide culinaire by Escoffier or The Professional Chef by the Culinary Institute of America, such books go at least back to medieval times, represented then by works such as Taillevent's Viandier and Chiquart d'Amiço's Du fait de cuisine.

=== Single-subject ===
Single-subject books, usually dealing with a specific ingredient, technique, class of dishes or target group (e.g. for kids), are quite common as well. Jack Monroe for example features low budget recipes. Some imprints such as Chronicle Books have specialized in this sort of book, with books on dishes like curries, pizza, and simplified ethnic food. Popular subjects for narrow-subject books on technique include grilling/barbecue, baking, outdoor cooking, and even recipe cloning (Recipe cloning is copying commercial recipes where the original is a trade secret).

=== Community ===
Community cookbooks (also known as compiled, regional, charitable, and fund-raising cookbooks) are a unique genre of culinary literature. Community cookbooks focus on home cooking, often documenting regional, ethnic, family, and societal traditions, as well as local history. Sondra Gotlieb, for example, wrote her cookbooks on Canadian food culture by visiting people and homes by region. She gathered recipes, observed the foodways, observed the people and their traditions of each region by being in their own homes. Gotlieb did this so that she could put together a comprehensive cookbook based on the communities and individuals that make up Canada. Gooseberry Patch has been publishing community-style cookbooks since 1992 and built their brand on this community.

Community cookbooks have sometimes been created to offer a counter-narrative of historical events or sustain a community through difficult times. The Historical Cookbook of the American Negro, published in 1958 by the National Council of Negro Women, includes recipes that illuminate histories of Black resistance, including "Nat Turner Crackling Bread." The 1976 People's Philadelphia Cookbook, published by grassroots organization The People's Fund, includes recipes from members of the Black Panther Party, The United Farm Workers, and the Gay Activist Alliance of Philadelphia. For In Memory's Kitchen, written in the 1940s by Jewish women interned at the Theresienstadt concentration camp in Czechoslovakia, women drew on their memories to contribute recipes.

=== Chefs ===
Cookbooks can also document the food of a specific chef (particularly in conjunction with a cooking show) or restaurant. Many of these books, particularly those written by or for a well-established cook with a long-running TV show or popular restaurant, become part of extended series of books that can be released over the course of many years. Popular chef-authors throughout history include people such as Delia Smith, Julia Child, James Beard, Nigella Lawson, Edouard de Pomiane, Jeff Smith, Emeril Lagasse, Claudia Roden, Madhur Jaffrey, Katsuyo Kobayashi, and possibly even Apicius, the semi-pseudonymous author of the Roman cookbook De re coquinaria, who shared a name with at least one other famous food figure of the ancient world.

== Famous cookbooks ==
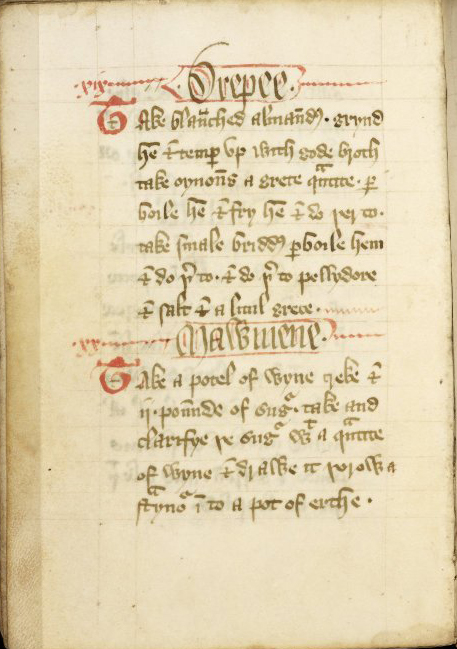
A page from the Forme of Cury (14th century) by the Master Cooks of King Richard II of England

Famous cookbooks from the past, in chronological order, include:

- De re coquinaria (The Art of Cooking) (late 4th / early 5th century) by Apicius
- Kitab al-Tabikh (The Book of Dishes) (10th century) by Ibn Sayyar al-Warraq
- Kitab al-Tabikh (The Book of Dishes) (1226) by Muhammad bin Hasan al-Baghdadi
- Liber de Coquina (The Book of Cookery) (late 13th / early 14th century) by two unknown authors from France and Italy
- Forme of Cury (14th century) by the Master Cooks of King Richard II of England
- Viandier (14th century) by Guillaume Tirel alias Taillevent
- De honesta voluptate et valetudine (1475) by Bartolomeo Platina - the first cookbook printed in a native language (Italian) in 1487
- Cookbook of Infanta Maria of Portugal (c. 1565) - the oldest extant Portuguese cookbook
- The Good Huswifes Jewell (1585) by Thomas Dawson
- The English Huswife (1615) by Gervase Markham
- Arte de Cocina, Pastelaria, Vizcocheria e Conservaria by Francisco Martinez Montiño - palace cook of King Philip II of Spain (1680).
- The Closet of the Eminently Learned Sir Kenelme Digbie Knight Opened by Kenelm Digby (1669)
- Ŭmsik timibang (1670) by Chang Kyehyang of Andong Chang clan
- Arte de Cozinha by Domingos Rodrigues - the first cookbook printed in Portuguese (1680)
- Compendium ferculorum, albo Zebranie potraw by Stanisław Czerniecki – first cookbook in Polish (1682)
- The Compleat Housewife (first American edition 1742) by Eliza Smith
- The Art of Cookery, Made Plain and Easy (1747) by Hannah Glasse
- Hjelpreda I Hushållningen För Unga Fruentimber (1755) by Cajsa Warg
- The Experienced English Housekeeper (1769) by Elizabeth Raffald
- American Cookery (1796) by Amelia Simmons
- A New System of Domestic Cookery (1806) by Maria Eliza Rundell
- Le Cuisinier Royal (1817) by André Viard
- Modern Cookery for Private Families (1845) by Eliza Acton
- El Cocinero Puerto - Riqueño 1859 (author unknown)
- Mrs Beeton's Book of Household Management (1861) by Mrs Beeton
- Подарок молодым хозяйкам, A Gift to Young Housewives (first Russian edition 1861) by Elena Molokhovets
- Domestic Cook Book: Containing a Careful Selection of Useful Receipts for the Kitchen (1866) by Malinda Russell – first known cookbook by an African American woman
- La scienza in cucina e l'arte di mangiar bene (1891) by Pellegrino Artusi
- The Epicurean (1894) by Charles Ranhofer
- The Boston Cooking-School Cook Book (1896) by Fannie Merritt Farmer
- The Settlement Cook Book (1901) and 34 subsequent editions by Lizzie Black Kander
- The Cook's Decameron: A Study In Taste, Containing Over Two Hundred Recipes For Italian Dishes (1901) by Mrs. W.G. Waters
- Various cookbooks (between 1903 and 1934) by Auguste Escoffier
- Edmonds Cookery Book (1908) by T.J. Edmonds Ltd
- Household Searchlight Recipe Book (1931) by Ida Migliario, Zorada Z. Titus, Harriet W. Allard, and Irene Nunemaker
- The Joy of Cooking (1931) by Irma Rombauer
- El libro de Doña Petrona (1934) by Doña Petrona
- Larousse Gastronomique (1938)
- Книга о вкусной и здоровой пище, The Book of Tasty and Healthy Food (first Soviet edition 1939) by the Institute of Nutrition, USSR
- O Livro de Pantagruel (first edition 1946) by Bertha Rosa-Limpo
- A Book of Mediterranean Food (1950) by Elizabeth David
- Il cucchiaio d'argento (1950)
- The Alice B. Toklas Cookbook (1954) by Alice B. Toklas
- Cooking with the Chinese Flavor (1956) and subsequent books by Lin Tsuifeng ("Mrs. Lin Yutang")
- Mrs Balbir Singh's Indian Cookery (1961) by Mrs Balbir Singh
- The Artists' & Writers' Cookbook (1961) with recipes from 150 famous writers and artists
- Mastering the Art of French Cooking (1961) by Simone Beck, Louisette Bertholle and Julia Child
- Ten Talents (1968) by Rosalie Hurd
- Helen Gurley Brown's Single Girl's Cookbook (1969) by Helen Gurley Brown
- The Fanny and Johnnie Cradock Cookery Programme (1970) by Fanny and Johnnie Cradock
- Diet for a Small Planet (1971) by Frances Moore Lappé
- The Vegetarian Epicure (1972) by Anna Thomas
- The Farm Vegetarian Cookbook (1975) by Louise Hagler
- The Complete International Jewish Cookbook (1976) by Evelyn Rose
- Laurel's Kitchen (1976) by Laurel Robertson, Carol Flinders, and Bronwen Godfrey
- Moosewood Cookbook (1978) by Mollie Katzen
- Australian Women's Weekly Children's Birthday Cake Book (1980) by Maryanne Blacker and Pamela Clark
- Vegetarian Cooking for Everyone (1997) by Deborah Madison

== Collections and collectors ==
Several libraries have extensive collections of cookbooks.

- Harvard's Schlesinger Library on the History of Women in America has a collection of 20,000 cookbooks and other books on food, including the earliest American cookbook, and the personal collections and papers of Julia Child, M.F.K. Fisher, and the authors of The Joy of Cooking.
- New York University's Fales Library includes a Food and Cookery Collection of over 15,000 books, including the personal libraries of James Beard, Cecily Brownstone, and Dalia Carmel.
- The Brotherton Library at University of Leeds holds a Designated Cookery Collection of over 8,000 books and 75 manuscripts, including the personal collections of Blanche Leigh, John Preston and Michael Bateman.

Some individuals are notable for their collections of cookbooks, or their scholarly interest therein. Elizabeth Robins Pennell, an American critic in London from the 1880s, was an early writer on the subject, and has recently been called "one of the most well-known cookbook collectors in the world". Much of her collection eventually went to the Rare Book and Special Collections Division at the Library of Congress. Held alongside hers are the thousands of gastronomic volumes donated by food chemist Katherine Bitting; their collections were evaluated in tandem in Two Loaf-Givers, by one of the LOC's curators; a digital version is available.

== Usage outside the world of food ==
The term cookbook is sometimes used metaphorically to refer to any book containing a straightforward set of already tried and tested "recipes" or instructions for a specific field or activity, presented in detail so that the users who are not necessarily expert in the field can produce workable results. Examples include a set of circuit designs in electronics, a book of magic spells, or The Anarchist Cookbook, a set of instructions on destruction and living outside the law. O'Reilly Media publishes a series of books about computer programming named the Cookbook series, and each of these books contain hundreds of ready to use, cut and paste examples to solve a specific problem in a single programming language.

== See also ==
- List of cookbook writers
  - Women
- Diet food
- Food writing
- List of nutrition guides
- Outline of food preparation
- Portion size
- Wikibooks Cookbook
