= Han Bok-ryeo =

South Korean food historian (born 1947)

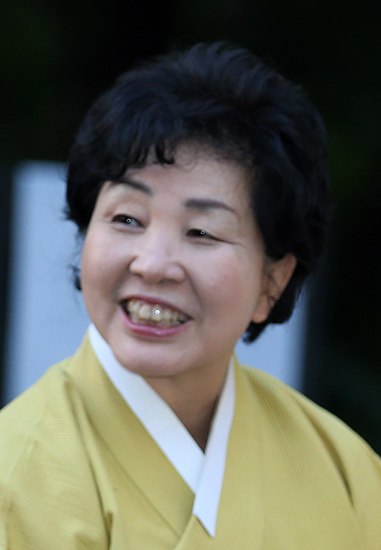
Han Bok-ryeo (2013)

Han Bok-ryeo (Korean: 한복려; Hanja: 韓福麗; born May 13, 1947) is a South Korean researcher of Korean royal court cuisine. She was born in 1947, the oldest daughter of Hwang Hye-seong, also a researcher of Korean royal court cuisine. She studied for her master's of Horticulture at The University of Seoul and Food Engineering at Korea University, and she got her doctorate in Food and Nutrition at Myongji University. She follows after her mother who made an effort to systematize Korean royal court cuisine, so she contributes to its reproduction and modernization. For her success in these efforts, she won the official commendation of the Minister of Culture. She was engaged in developing menus and providing support at the Inter-Korean summit in 2000; she also was the consultant for the dishes served in Korean soap opera Dae Jang Geum. She is now the director of the Institute of Korean Royal Cuisine and is running two Korean restaurants named 'Jihwaja' (지화자), and 'Gungyeon' (궁연). She was registered as "important cultural property No.38: Korean royal court cuisine artisan."

== Bibliography ==
- 1985, Royal Court Cuisine and Seoul Cuisine (Daewonsa, color books series)
- 1989, Tteok and Snacks (Daewonsa, color books series)
- 1991, Korean Traditional Cuisine (Kyomunsa)
- 1991, Han Bok-ryeo's Bop (The Deep Rooted Tree)
- 1995, Seoul Cuisine and Royal Court Cuisine (Daewonsa, color books series)
- 1995, How to Make Soybean Paste Like Mother-in-Law's from The Head Family (Dunggie)
- 1997, Food Life in Court (Comprehensive Compilation of Korean Food No.6, Korean Cultural Heritage Foundation)
- 1998, Cooking is Fun When You Follow Han Bok-ryeo's Recipe (Joongang M&B)
- 1998, We Should Know This Cuisine 100 (Hyeonamsa)
- 1999, We Should Know This Kimchi 100 (Hyeonamsa)
- 1999, Make Tteok Easily, Deliciously, and Beautifully (Institute of Korean Royal Cuisine)
- 1999, See Again and Study Traditional Food, Eumsik dimibang (Institute of Korean Royal Cuisine)
- 1999, Han Bok-ryeo's Side Dish Story (Joongang M&B)
- 2000, Make Hangwha Easily, Tastily, and Beautifully (Institute of Korean Royal Cuisine)
- 2000, Han Bok-ryeo and Choi Nan-hwa's Korean Course Cuisine (Joongang M&B)
- 2000, Han Bok-ryeo's Guk, Jjigae, and Jeongol (Joongang M&B)
- 2001, Han Bok-ryeo's Korean Food 278 (Joongang M&B)
- 2001, See Again and Study jeonsunmussangsinnsikyorijebup (Institute of Korean Royal Cuisine)
- 2003, Hwang Hye-seong, Han Bok-ryeo, Jeong Gil-ja's Royal Court Cuisine Carried on a Family Line (Institute of Korean Royal Cuisine)
- 2004, Make Royal Court Cuisine at Home(Chungrim)
- 2005, The Cook Book Removes Worry about Side Dishes (Joongang M&B)
- 2007, See Again and Study Sanga yorok (Institute of Korean Royal Cuisine)
- 2008, The Cook Book Mother Gives Daughter (Housewife's Life Magazine)

== See also ==
- Yoon Sook-ja
- Gyuhap chongseo
- Suunjapbang
- Domundaejak
