= Yoon Sook-ja =

South Korean cooking researcher (born 1948)

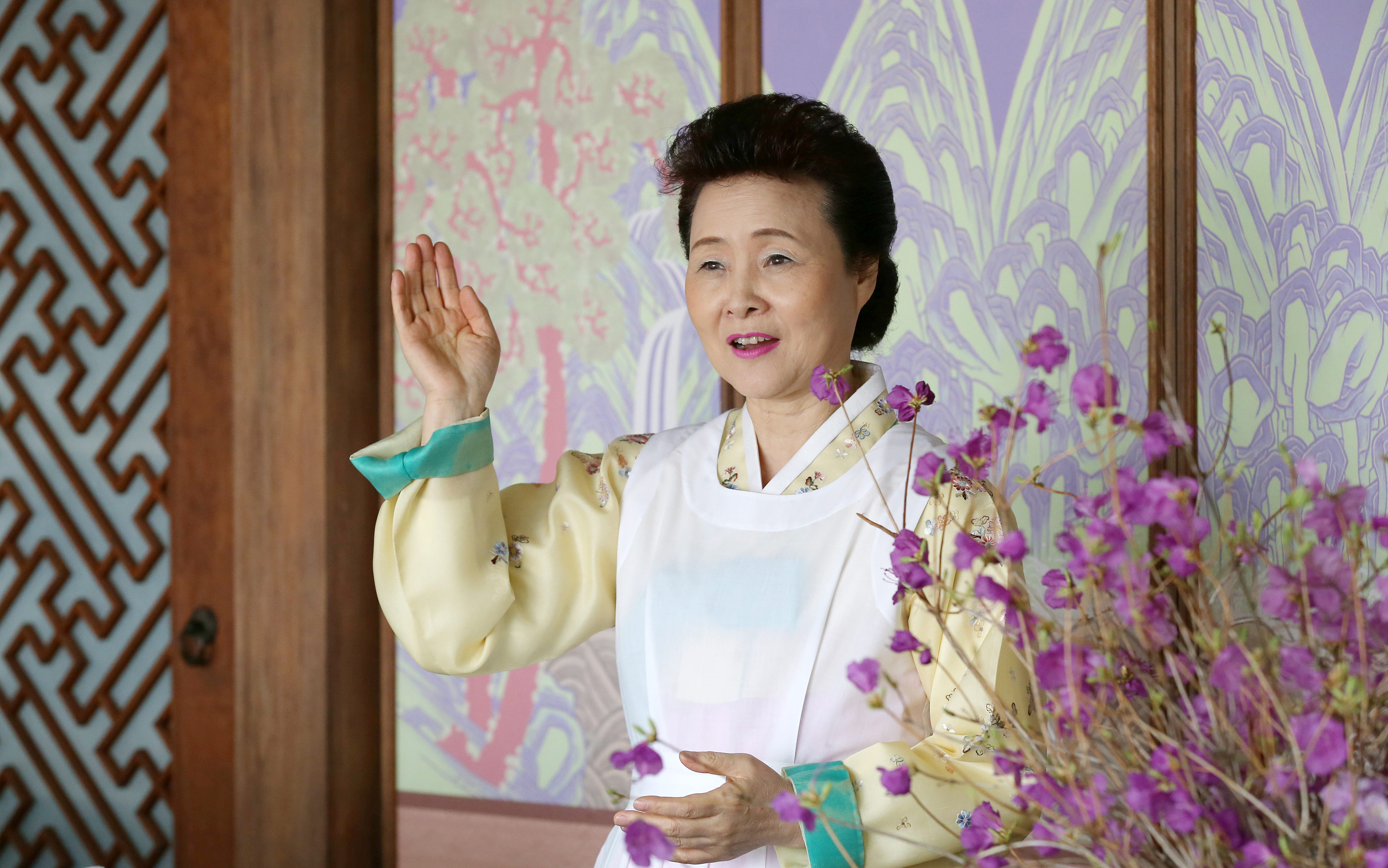
- Yoon in 2016
- Born: June 6, 1948 (age 78)
- Education: Sookmyung Women's University; Dankook University
- Employer: Institute of Traditional Korean Food

Korean name
- Hangul: 윤숙자
- Hanja: 尹淑子
- RR: Yun Sukja
- MR: Yun Sukcha

Yoon Sook-ja (Korean: 윤숙자; born June 6, 1948) is a South Korean cooking researcher and professor.

== Education and career ==
She got her master's degree in Food and Nutrition at Sookmyung Women's University, and took her doctoral course in Food and Nutrition at Dankook University. She was the associate professor of Traditional Cookery at Baewha Women's University, and now she is the head of the Institute of Traditional Korean Food, where she is also a professor in the Department of Food and Cooking. Additionally, she is the head of the Tteok Museum. She has given presentations on Korean food in London.

She was one of the people in charge of South Korea's return banquet at the 2007 Inter-Korean summit.

== Bibliography ==
- 1997, Our Kitchen Gadget (LIFE & DREAM)
- 1998, Korean Traditional Cuisine (JIGU PUBLISHING Co.)
- 2000, Korean Foods in Season (時節飮食) (JIGU PUBLISHING Co.)
- 2001, Korean Traditional Desserts : Ricecakes, cookies and beverages English translation from the Korean by Young-Hie Han. ISBN 978-89-7006-239-6
- 2002, Indigo Town's Hangwa (Jilsiru)
- 2003, Tteok in Scenery, Good-Morning Kimchi (Jilsiru)
- 2006, Beautiful Wedding Food (Jilsiru), Korea's Tteok Hangwa Eumcheongnyu (JIGU PUBLISHING Co.)
- 2007, Our Beautiful Alcohol (Jilsiru), Basic Cooking of Korean Food with Professor Yoon sook-ja (JIGU PUBLISHING Co.)
- 2008, Our Food Ingredients Good for Eat Q&A (JIGU PUBLISHING Co.) - Joint Authorship with Choi Bong-seun, Choi Eun-hui

=== Translation ===
- 2003, Gyuhap chongseo (규합총서; Jilsiru)
- 2006, Suunjapbang (수운잡방; Jilsiru)

=== Supervision (Children's Books) ===
- 2006, You and Me, Grab a Spoon and Come on in (Knowing Our Country Well 5 - Foods, Daekyobook)
- 2007, Meju Flowers Blooming (Food Relics, Trip Our Relics 4, Joongang Publishing)

== See also ==
- Han Bok-ryeo
- Tomundaejak
- Ŭmsik timibang
- Sanga yorok
