= Hwang Hye-seong =

South Korean food historian (1920–2006)

Hwang during her later years

Hwang Hye-seong (Korean: 황혜성; Hanja: 黃慧性; July 5, 1920 – December 14, 2006) was a professor and researcher of Korean royal court cuisine. After studying in Japan, she learned Korean royal court cuisine from the last kitchen court lady, Han Hui-sun. She was a professor at Sookmyung Women's University, Hanyang University and Myongji University, and she was the Dean of the School of Home Economics at Sungkyunkwan University. In 1986, she was registered as an Important Intangible Cultural Property No.38: the Second Artisan. She was also awarded an Order of Civil Merit in 1986, as well as an Order of Cultural Merit in 1990 for providing and modernizing Korean royal court cuisine. Hwang Hye-seong was registered as a Korean Royal Court Cuisine Possessor of Honor.

== Life ==
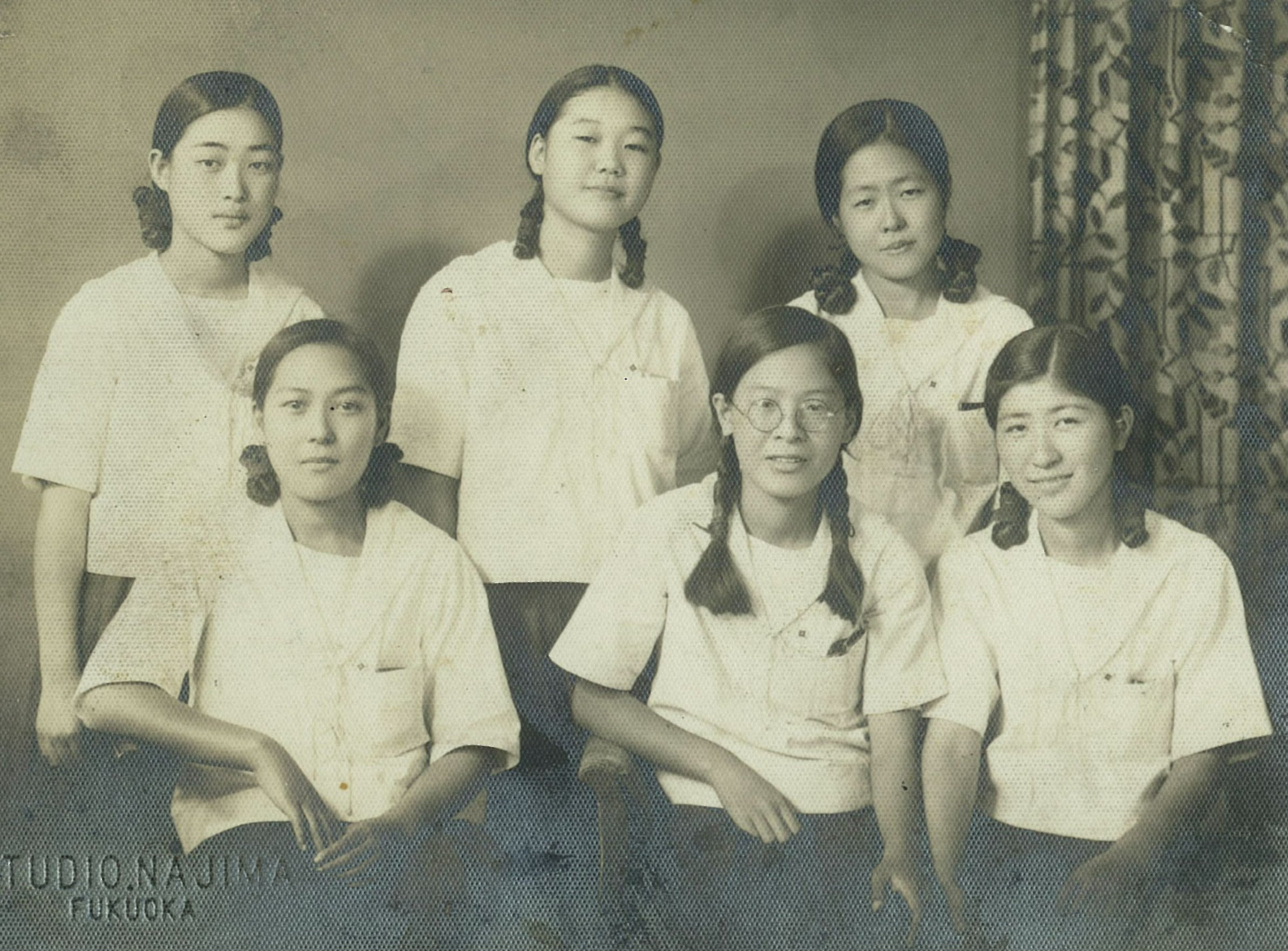
Hwang during her days in Chukja Girls' High School

Hwang Hye-seong was born in 1920 in Cheonan, South Chungcheong Province, Korea, Empire of Japan. She studied in Japan and graduated from Fukuoka Chukja Girls' High School, and she studied Japanese Cuisine and Western Nutrition in the Department of Domestic Studies at Kyoto Seminary for Young Ladies. In 1941, she was nominated as an assistant professor in Domestic Studies at Sookmyung Women's University, and she started teaching Nutritional Science. At the same time, she visited Han Hui-sun who lived at Changdeokgung's Nakseonjae. Han Hui-sun was the last kitchen court lady in Joseon Dynasty, and Hye-seong learned Korean royal court cuisine from her for 30 years.

In 1972, she was the Technical Expert of Cultural Properties in the Office of Cultural Properties. She measured ingredients for Korean royal court cuisine, and organized food preparation systematically. When she was a professor, she worked to solidify her scholarly background in the culture of Korean royal court cuisine. She founded the Institute of Korean Royal Cuisine in Kahyaedong, Jongno District, Seoul in 1971, and she contributed to the practical passing down and propagating of Korean royal court cuisine.

She exhibited and gave courses on Korean royal court cuisine several times in America, Japan, France, the Philippines, Taiwan and so on.

Hwang is familiar to many South Koreans because she introduced Korean royal court cuisine via mass media. She has one son and three daughters, all of whom work in a job related to Korean royal court cuisine. Han Bok-ryeo, the oldest daughter, is director of the Institute of Korean Royal Cuisine and she was registered as a Third Generation Korean Royal Court Cuisine Artisan. Han Bok-sun, the second daughter, manages the Han Bok-sun Food Culture Laboratory, and Han Bok-jin, the third daughter, works as a Dean of the Culture and Tourism at Jeonju University.

Hwang died of old age at the age of 86, at 12:30 PM, December 14, 2006.

== Bibliography ==
Hwang Hye-seong wrote Ijogungjeongyoritonggo joint work with her teacher, Han Hie-sun, at the first onset. She left a lot of theis and 10 Korean royal court cuisine and traditional food specialty publications.

- 1957, Ijogungjeongyoritonggo (hanja: 李朝宮廷料理通考)
- 1976, Encyclopedias of Korean Traditional Cuisine
- 1982, Cuisine of Korea (hanja: 韓國의 料理)
- 1997, Overall View of Korean Cuisine - 6th Food Life of the Court
- 1998, Our Cuisine 100
- Royal Court Cuisine
- Esthetics of Korea (hanja: 韓國의 味覺)
- Taste of the Tradition
- The Time I Prepared 12 Dishes of Surasang
- A Review Study of the Royal Banquet Menu on the 24th of King Kojong in Chosun Dynasty

== See also ==
- Han Bok-ryeo
- Yoon Sook-ja
- Suunjapbang
- Domundaejak
