= Mandu-guk =

Korean dumpling soup

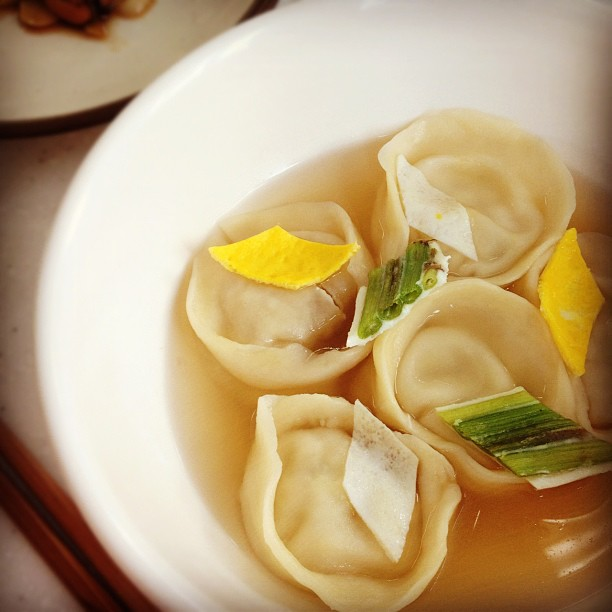
- Alternative names: Dumpling soup
- Type: Guk
- Place of origin: Korea
- Main ingredients: Mandu
- Food energy (per 1 serving): 88 kcal (370 kJ)

Korean name
- Hangul: 만둣국
- Hanja: 饅頭국
- RR: mandutguk
- MR: mandukkuk
- IPA: [man.du(t̚).k͈uk̚]

Mandu-guk (Korean: 만둣국) or dumpling soup is a variety of Korean soup (guk) made by boiling mandu (dumplings) in a beef broth or anchovy broth mixed with beaten egg.

== History ==
According to the 14th-century history text Goryeosa, mandu had already been introduced via Central Asia during the Goryeo period. Mandu was called sanghwa (쌍화) or gyoja (교자) until the mid-Joseon period. It became a local specialty of the Pyongan and Hamgyong regions, as both wheat and buckwheat – the main ingredients for flour – were mainly cultivated in the north.

Mandu was made and cooked in various ways, including manduguk. In the Korean royal court, the dish was called byeongsi (병시) while in Ŭmsik timibang, a Joseon-era cookbook, it was called seokryutang (석류탕). It is not known when mandu-guk began to go by its current name.

== Preparation and serving ==
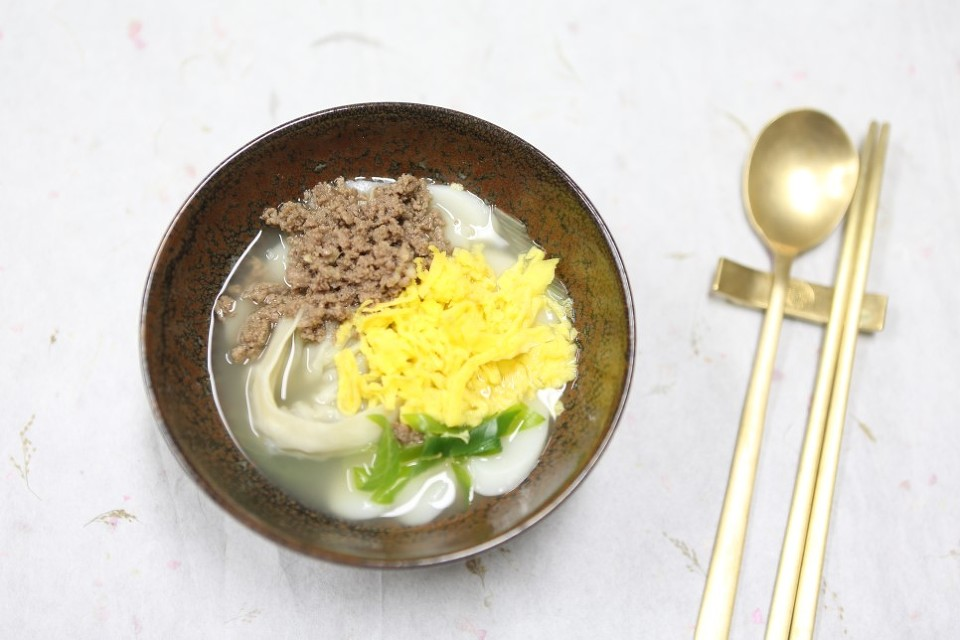
Tteok-mandu-guk (sliced rice cake and dumpling soup)

Dumplings are made by rolling out thin circles of dough, creating a half-moon shape and filling them with a mixture of minced meat, vegetables, tofu and sometimes kimchi. The dumplings are then boiled in a broth traditionally made by boiling anchovies, shiitake mushroom stems and onions.

Some variations make the broth from beef stock. The addition of tteok, a cylindrical rice cake, is common as well, changing the dish's name into tteok-mandu-guk.

== See also ==
- Tteokguk, rice cake soup
- Kal-guksu, knife-cut noodle soup
- Kreplach, dumpling soup
- Mokthuk, Tibetan soup dumplings
- Jhol momo, Nepalese soup dumplings
