= Gooseberry Patch =

American publisher of cookbooks

- Parent company: Globe Pequot Press
- Founded: 1984
- Founder: Vickie Hutchins and Jo Ann Martin
- Country of origin: United States
- Headquarters location: Columbus, Ohio
- Publication types: Books
- Nonfiction topics: Cooking
- Official website: gooseberrypatch.com

Gooseberry Patch is an American company that publishes cookbooks. It was founded in 1984 by Vickie Hutchins and Jo Ann Martin, who were neighbors in Delaware, Ohio, as a mail-order recipe catalog "selling old-fashioned, country-style products." Before starting their catalog business, Martin worked as a first-grade teacher, and Hutchins was a flight attendant.

Gooseberry Patch encourages customers to submit recipes, some of which are selected for inclusion in Gooseberry Patch recipe books. Since 1992, over 200 cookbooks have been published with nearly 9.0 million sold. Crowdsourcing or peer production, both relatively new terms, have been an integral part of the cookbook production since 1992.

Gooseberry Patch's five all-time bestselling titles—Five Ingredients or Less; Super-Fast, Slow Cooking; Meals in Minutes; Best-Ever Casseroles; and Christmas Kitchen—have each sold over 175,000 copies.

To satisfy the growing customer demand, Gooseberry Patch has expanded the availability of their cookbooks through multiple channel partners. A few of these include the National Book Network, Notions Marketing Corporation, and Send the Light Distribution. In order to focus on cookbook publishing and reduce any potential channel conflict with retail partners, the Gooseberry Patch mail order catalog was discontinued at the end of 2009.

Gooseberry Patch launched their first eBook titles in the fall of 2010.

Gooseberry Patch was acquired by Rowman & Littlefield in 2015; it now operates as an imprint of Globe Pequot Press.
