= Hye-sung =

- Hangul: 혜성
- RR: Hyeseong
- MR: Hyesŏng

Hye-sung, also spelled as Hye-seong or Hye-song, is a Korean given name.

People with this name include:

- Hwang Hye-seong (1920–2006), South Korean professor and researcher of Korean royal court cuisine
- Han Hye-song (fl. 1985), North Korean table tennis player
- Shin Hye-sung (born 1979), South Korean singer, member of boyband Shinhwa
- Kim Hye-song (boxer) (born 1984), North Korean boxer
- Hyun Hye-sung (born 1986), South Korean field hockey player
- Kim Hye-seong (actor) (born 1988), South Korean actor
- Jung Hye-sung (born 1991), South Korean actress
- Kim Hye-song (runner) (born 1993), North Korean runner
- Kim Hye-song (gymnast) (born 1997), North Korean gymnast
- Hyeseong (singer) (born Yang Hye-sun, 1999), South Korean singer, member of girl group Elris

Fictional characters with this name include:

- Jang Hye-sung, character in 2013 South Korean television series I Can Hear Your Voice
- Joo Hye-sung, character in 2016 South Korean television series Hey Ghost, Let's Fight.
- Nam Hye-sung, character in 2014 South Korean television series You Are the Only One

== See also ==
- List of Korean given names
