= 饅頭 =

饅頭 may refer to:

- Mandu (만두; 饅頭), dumplings in Korean cuisine
- Manjū (饅頭; まんじゅう), a Japanese steamed bun with filling
- Mántou (馒头; 饅頭), a Chinese steamed bun without filling
