= Eo-mandu =

Fish dumpling

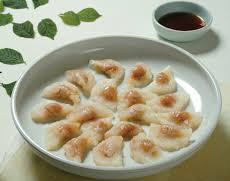
- Type: Mandu
- Place of origin: Korea
- Associated cuisine: Korean cuisine
- Main ingredients: Whitefish (brown croaker or flathead grey mullet)
- Food energy (per 4 serving): 200 kcal (840 kJ)

Korean name
- Hangul: 어만두
- Hanja: 魚饅頭
- RR: eomandu
- MR: ŏmandu
- IPA: ʌ.man.du

Eo-mandu (Korean: 어만두; lit. 'fish dumpling') is a half-moon-shaped mandu (dumpling) prepared with filleted whitefish, most typically brown croakers, instead of flour dough as the wrapping. In the past, it formed part of Korean royal court cuisine, and was a popular dish among the yangban (upper class). It was often served at summer birthday tables for elder family members. It is commonly eaten during Buddha's Birthday.

== Preparation ==
Whitefish, such as brown croakers, flathead grey mullets, red seabreams, or olive flounders, is filleted into thin, 7–8 centimetres (2.8–3.1 in) long slices, seasoned with salt and ground black pepper, and pounded lightly with the back of the knife. Common fillings include ground beef, shiitake mushrooms, cucumber, crumbled tofu, chopped scallions, minced garlic and toasted and ground sesame seeds. The inner surface of each fish slice is dusted with mung bean starch, the filling is placed on it and it is then folded in half and sealed. The edges of the dumplings are trimmed with kitchen scissors to create the half-moon shapes. The dumplings are then coated with mung bean starch, and cooked either in boiling water or in the steamer lined with Boston ivy leaves. Cooked dumplings are commonly served with a dipping sauce such as mustard or choganjang (soy sauce mixed with vinegar).

== See also ==
- Korean royal court cuisine
- Dae Jang Geum
- List of steamed foods
