= Globe Pequot Publishing Group =

American independent book publishing company

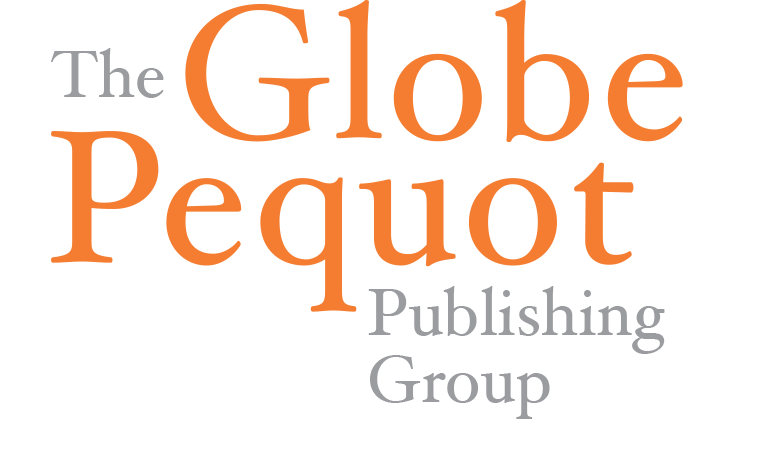
- Predecessor: Rowman & Littlefield Publishing Group; Globe Pequot Press
- Founded: 1949; 77 years ago
- Founder: Walter Rowman and Arthur W. Littlefield
- Country of origin: United States
- Headquarters location: Essex, Connecticut, U.S.
- Distribution: Simon & Schuster Distribution Services (US); NBN International (UK)
- Imprints: Many
- Official website: globepequot.com

The Globe Pequot Publishing Group (formerly Rowman & Littlefield Publishing Group) is an American independent book publishing company founded in 1949. Under several imprints, the company offers various regional and interest books in the trade books publishing. The company also formerly owned book distributor National Book Network based in Lanham, Maryland until its closure in 2025.

== History ==
Previous wordmark as Rowman & Littlefield, used until 2024

The current company took shape when the University Press of America acquired Rowman & Littlefield in 1988 and took the Rowman & Littlefield name for the holding company.

Since 2013, there has also been an affiliated company based in London called Rowman & Littlefield International. It is editorially independent and publishes only academic books in Philosophy, Politics & International Relations and Cultural Studies.

Rowman & Littlefield acquired Globe Pequot Press in 2014.

The company sponsors the Rowman & Littlefield Award in Innovative Teaching, the only national teaching award in political science given in the United States. It is awarded annually by the American Political Science Association for people whose innovations have advanced political science pedagogy.

On May 29, 2024, Rowman & Littlefield sold its academic and professional publishing business to Bloomsbury Publishing. The sale excluded most of trade publishing business under Globe Pequot (but included Applause Books and Backbeat Books), school publishing business Sundance Newbridge, and book distributor National Book Network. As the Rowman & Littlefield name and trademark were included in the sale, the holding company subsequently changed its name to The Globe Pequot Publishing Group, taking its name from one of its trade publishing imprints which the company retained.

The Globe Pequot Publishing Group later sold Sundance Newbridge to Lerner Publishing in September 2024. The company announced that National Book Network will be closed down, with distribution of titles moved to Simon & Schuster Distribution Services in the second half of 2025.

== Imprints ==
=== Current imprints ===
- Astragal Press
- Globe Pequot Press (acquired 2014 from Morris Communications)
- Down East Books (acquired by Rowman & Littlefield in 2013)
- Eclipse Press
- Falcon Guides
- Gooseberry Patch (acquired 2015)
- Lyons Press
- Muddy Boots (launched 2016)
- North Country Press (acquired 2022)
- Pineapple Press (acquired 2018)
- Riverbend Publishing
- Sheridan House
- Stackpole Books (acquired 2015)
- Union Park Press
- Waterford Press
- Northland Publishing backlist (acquired in 2007)
- including Rising Moon and Luna Rising imprints
- TwoDot Books
- Prometheus Books (acquired 2019)

=== Former imprints ===
Imprints formerly published by Rowman & Littlefield include:

- Lexington Books (sold to Bloomsbury Publishing in 2024)
- Applause Books (sold to Bloomsbury Publishing in 2024)
- Applause Theatre & Cinema Books (acquired 2018 from Hal Leonard)
- Backbeat Books (sold to Bloomsbury Publishing in 2024)
- Bernan Press (acquired 2008, sold to Bloomsbury Publishing in 2024)
- Hal Leonard Books (acquired 2018 from Hal Leonard, sold to Bloomsbury Publishing in 2024)
- Amadeus Books (acquired 2018 from Hal Leonard)
- Limelight Editions (acquired 2018 from Hal Leonard)
- Jason Aronson (acquired 2003, discontinued 2014)
- Rowman & Littlefield Education or R&L Education (formerly Technomic Books, acquired 1999)
- Rowman & Littlefield (acquired 1988 by UPA, sold to Bloomsbury Publishing in 2024 which discontinued it as a separate imprint in 2025)
- Philip Turner Books (founded 2009)
- Alban (acquired 2014 from the Alban Institute, sold to Bloomsbury Publishing in 2024)
- AltaMira Press (acquired 1999 from SAGE Publications)
- Ardsley House Publishers, Inc.
- Bonus Books
- Bridge Works (acquired 2000)
- Cooper Square Press (founded 1961 by Rowman & Littlefield, acquired 1988 by UPA)
- Cowley Publications (acquired 2007 from the Society of St. John the Evangelist.)
- The Derrydale Press (acquired 1999)
- General Hall (acquired 2000)
- Government Institutes (acquired 2004)
- Hamilton Books (founded 2003)
- Ivan R. Dee (acquired 1998)
- M. Evans (acquired 2005)
- Madison Books (founded 1985 by UPA, back catalog continues to be sold by Globe Pequot as of 2025)
- Madison House Publishers (acquired 2000)
- Newbridge Educational Publishing (acquired 2008 from Haights Cross)
- Northword Books for Young Readers (acquired 2007)
- Roberts Rinehart (acquired 2000)
- Scarecrow Press (acquired 1995 by UPA from Grolier)
- Sheed & Ward (founded in the 1920s in London by Frank Sheed and his wife, Maisie Ward, both prominent in the Catholic Action movement; acquired 2002 from the Priests of the Sacred Heart)
- SR Books (acquired 2004 from Scholarly Resources, Inc., of Wilmington, Delaware)
- Sundance Publishing (acquired 2008 from Haights Cross)
- Taylor Trade Publishing (acquired by Rowman & Littlefield in 2001, back catalog continues to be sold by Globe Pequot as of 2025)
- Two-Can Publishing (acquired 2007, back catalog continues to be sold by Globe Pequot as of 2025)
- University Press of America (founded 1975)
- The World Today Series (acquired 2011 from Stryker-Post Publications)

== Distribution ==
- Bucknell University Press
- Fairleigh Dickinson University Press
- Lehigh University Press
- University of Delaware Press
- Smithsonian Institution Scholarly Press
- C&T Publishing

== See also ==
- List of book distributors
