= El libro de Doña Petrona =

El libro de Doña Petrona (Spanish for "Doña Petrona's book") is a cookbook by Doña Petrona. It was first released in 1934 and continues to be published, with over one hundred editions. In addition to being a commercial and editorial success, the book is a cult object and old editions are highly valued by collectors.

== Translations ==
It has been translated into eight languages.

== Reviews ==
Argentine journalists have called it "the best-selling book in Latin America".
