= Doña Petrona =

Argentine cook and author

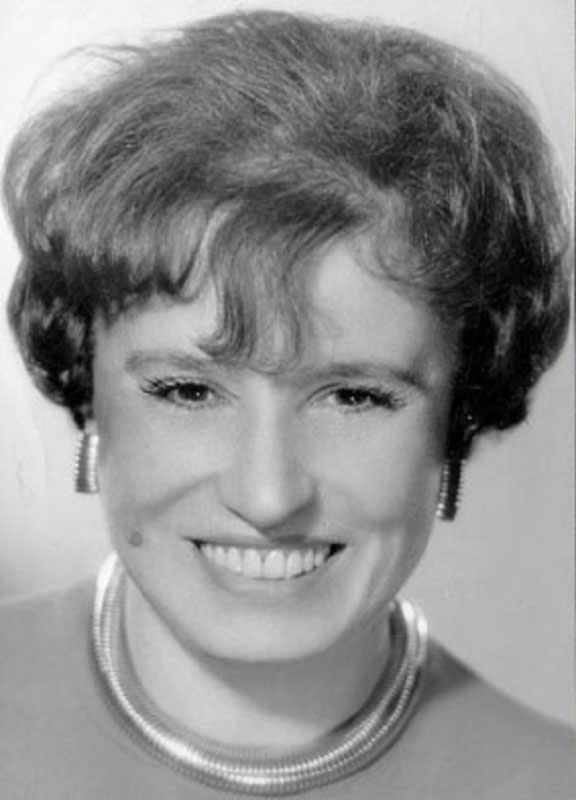
- Doña Petrona in 1962
- Born: Petrona Carrizo; June 29, 1896; La Banda, Santiago del Estero, Argentina
- Died: February 6, 1992 (aged 95); Olivos, Buenos Aires Province, Argentina
- Occupations: Cookbook author; home economist; TV chef; businesswoman
- Notable work: El libro de Doña Petrona (1934)
- Style: Argentine cuisine
- Television: Variedades hogareñas (1952); Buenas tardes, mucho gusto (1960)
- Spouse(s): Oscar Gandulfo (m. 1923; died 1943) Atilio Massut (m. 1946; died 1979)

Petrona Carrizo de Gandulfo (June 29, 1896 – February 6, 1992), better known as Doña Petrona, was an Argentine best-selling cookbook writer, home economist, television chef and businesswoman who was famous for "her elaborate dishes, provincial accent, matronly figure, didactic tone, and bossy treatment of her assistant Juana Bordoy, as well as her responsiveness to fans". Although recognized as "the most famous Argentine cook", she was quoted as saying in 1985: "I never wanted to be anything other than a home economist. No one, except my friends, can say that they had Doña Petrona in their kitchen at any time."

Her cookbook El libro de Doña Petrona (Spanish for "Doña Petrona's book") was first released in 1934 and continues to be published, with over one hundred editions. Doña Petrona built a multimedia empire around her own name and used it to establish herself as the most popular and commercially supported celebrity chef in 20th-century Argentina.

Over her seven-decade-long career, Doña Petrona was a highly influential figure for Argentine housewives. She had a lasting impact in Argentine cuisine and is regarded as a cultural icon. Her figure has been compared to that of Isabella Beeton in the United Kingdom, as her "popularity stemmed from her ability to tap into the desire for 'expert' domestic advice among the emerging middle classes". Her closest counterparts can be found not in other Latin American nations but rather in the United States, having points in common with Fannie Farmer, Betty Crocker, Irma Rombauer and Julia Child. However, due in part to Argentina's more concentrated media market, Doña Petrona's success "compares to not one, but all the major legends of home cooking in the United States put together."

== See also ==
- List of chefs
- South American cuisine
