= Andong Jang clan =

Korean clan from North Gyeongsang Province

- Country: Korea
- Current region: Andong
- Founder: Chang Chŏng-p'il
- Connected members: Chang Kyehyang; Chang Kee-ryo; Chang Chun-ha
- Website: http://www.andongjangc.com/

The Andong Jang clan (Korean: 안동 장씨; Hanja: 安東 張氏) is a Korean clan with a bon-gwan located in Andong, North Gyeongsang Province. According to the census held in 2015, the population of the Andong Jang clan was 39,939. Their founder was Chang Chŏng-p'il who was the head of a powerful clan during the Later Three Kingdoms period. Chang Chŏng-p'il was one of the three merit subjects from Andong, along with Kim Sŏn-p'yŏng (Hanja: 金宣平) and Kwŏn Haeng (Hanja: 權幸), when Taejo of Goryeo fought Kyŏn Hwŏn of Later Baekje at the Battle of Pyeongsan. Chang Chŏng-p'il's ancestor was a Chinese who moved in Korea during the end of Silla.

== See also ==
- Korean clan names of foreign origin
