= The Cook's Decameron =

1901 cookbook by Emily Waters

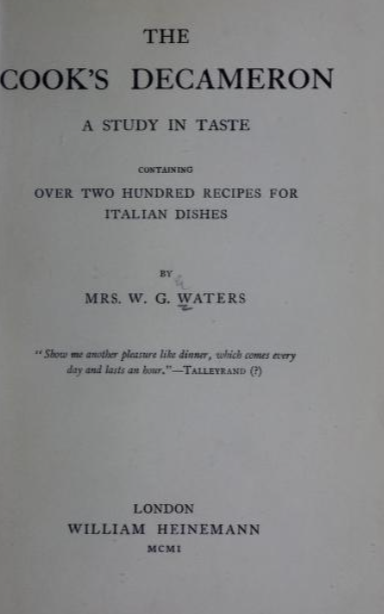
- Title page for The Cook's Decameron: A Study In Taste, Containing Over Two Hundred Recipes For Italian Dishes (1901)
- Author: Emily Waters
- Genre: Cookbook
- Publication date: 1901

The Cook's Decameron: A Study In Taste, Containing Over Two Hundred Recipes For Italian Dishes is a cookbook by Emily Waters (as Mrs. W. G. Waters) first published in 1901.

Introduced in the form of a story inspired by Giovanni Boccaccio's Decameron (for which it is named), the book introduces the fictional Marchesa di Sant Andrea who learns that nine aristocratic friends have all been forced to postpone much anticipated dinner parties as their cooks have all resigned. That evening, the Marchesa and her friends meet and make plans to establish a cooking school under the Marchesa's direction. Following the introductory fiction, the form reverts to a more conventional cookbook, and Waters presents more than 200 recipes for Italian dishes.

The book was initially published in 1901 in London (William Heineman) and New York (Brentano). It was successful enough to be reprinted and in 1920 Waters published a sequel, Just a Cookery Book, published by the Medici Society and containing 400 recipes.

Waters (née Paton), who died in 1928, was also a skilled classicist and collaborated with her husband, William George Waters, in translating Italian Renaissance literature.
