= Household Searchlight Recipe Book =

Cookbook published in USA

- Author: Ida Migliario, Zorada Z. Titus, Harriet W. Allard, Irene Nunemaker
- Genre: Cookbook
- Publisher: Capper Publications, Topeka, Kansas
- Publication date: 1931

The Household Searchlight Recipe Book was one of the most-published cookbooks in the United States. It was in print almost continuously from 1931 until 1954, and sold more than 1 million copies. It was published by Capper Publications of Topeka, Kansas, and was reprinted five times between 1977 and 1991 by Stauffer Publications.

== Editions ==
=== First printing (1931) ===
In 1931, Capper Publications released 2,500 copies of the book.

=== Second printing (1932) ===
Due to the book's popularity, Capper released a second printing in 1932 in an edition of 6,200 copies. Added to this edition were 15 blank pages at the end, with the heading "Additional Recipes" for the book's owner to add their own recipes.

=== Third printing (1934) ===
As demand for the cookbook continued to grow, Capper released the third printing in an edition of 11,995 copies.

=== Fourth edition (1934) ===
A second print-run of 14,009 copies were released after the initial printing in the same year as the third printing, for a total of 26,004 copies in a single year. The Joy of Cooking was likely the only other American cookbook that was outselling The Household Searchlight Recipe Book.

== See also ==
- Books in the United States
