= Evelyn Rose =

British Jewish cookery writer

Evelyn Rose MBE (2 December 1925 – 18 May 2003) was an Anglo-Jewish cookery writer. Her magnum opus on Jewish cuisine, the Complete International Jewish Cookbook, was published in 1976 and has been revised three times since, most recently in 2011.

Her obituary in The Guardian described her singular accomplishment as the melding of "contemporary cooking with Jewish dietary laws, regulations that not only prohibit the use of pig meat and shellfish, but also the mixing of dairy products with meat". Evelyn Rose was also "highly aware of the changes in culinary trends, particularly the move away from the fatty foods so typical of traditional Jewish cooking ... her modern, health-conscious recipes exemplified the changes that had taken place over her long career."

== Career ==
Rose was evacuated to the United States, and her school in Seattle c. 1940 provided a home economics course; it was this experience that started her on the way to a career in cooking and food writing. On her return to Britain, she declined the offer of a university place to study psychology, and attended the Manchester College of Housecraft, where she specialised in demonstration techniques. Her television work started in the 1950s, when she wrote to the BBC suggesting a course in Jewish cookery and she later became the resident cook for Granada Television in the 1970s.

Rose was the first woman commissioner at the Meat and Livestock Commission, and was made an MBE in 1989. She was also an honorary life fellow of the Institute of Home Economics, and a former chair of the National Guild of Food Writers. Rose wrote a weekly food column for The Jewish Chronicle from 1963, succeeding Florence Greenberg, never missing a single issue, and also wrote a food column for the wine magazine, Decanter.

== Personal life ==
Born in Manchester, Rose lived in the city all her life except for the four years she spent in the United States as an evacuee. Evelyn Rose was survived by her husband Myer, whom she married in 1948. Myer and Evelyn had three children; sons David and Alan, and a daughter, Judi. During her time in the United States Rose worked as a secretary at the MGM studios in California. She was invited to audition for the lead role in National Velvet, which was won by Elizabeth Taylor.

Judi assisted her mother with the writing of her column and books in her later years, and produced the third revised edition of The Complete International Jewish Cookbook in 2011 following two years work. Judi and her mother also wrote The First-Time Cookbook in 1982 for children leaving home, and Mother and Daughter Jewish Cooking in 2000.

== Bibliography ==
- The Jewish Home (1969)
- The Complete International Jewish Cookbook (1976)
- More Recipes from "Look North" (1977)
- The Entertaining Cookbook (1981)
- Jewish Cookery with Magimix (1981)
- Round the Year with Rakusens (1981)
- The New Jewish Cuisine (1988)
- Evelyn Rose Goes Microwave In the Jewish Kitchen (1989)
- The Essential Jewish Festival Cookbook (2000, ISBN 978-1-86105-303-9)

With Sula Leon

- Masterclass for Creative Cooks (1992)
- Weekend Cook: 100 Simple and Sensational Recipes for the Cook in a Hurry (1994)

With Judi Rose

- The First-Time Cookbook (1982)
- Mother and Daughter Jewish Cooking: Two Generations of Jewish Women Share Traditional and Contemporary Recipes (2000, ISBN 978-0-688-16451-5)
- The New Complete International Jewish Cookbook (2011, ISBN 978-1-86205-908-5)
