= Mandu (food) =

Korean dumplings

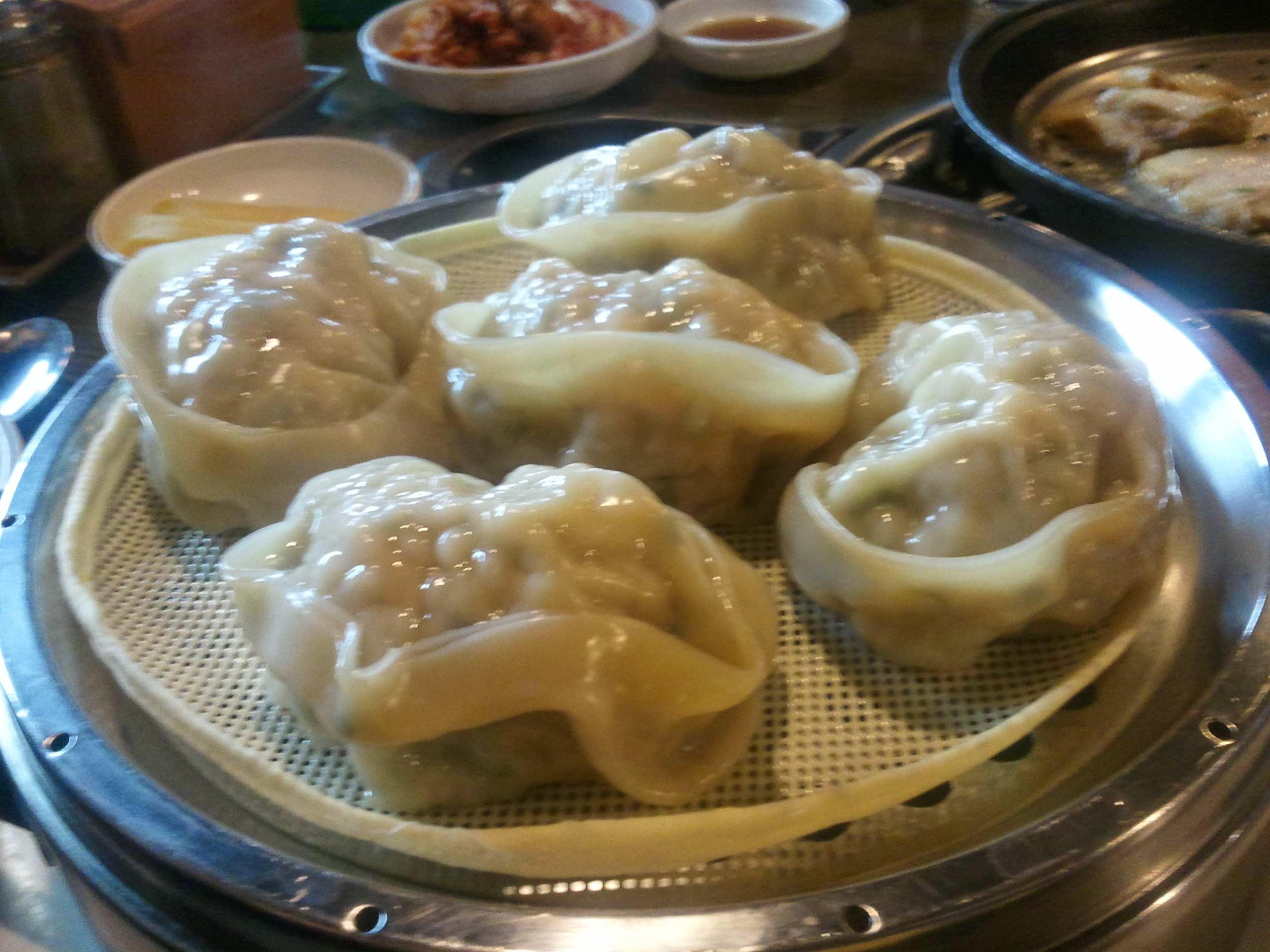
- Jjin-mandu (steamed dumplings)
- Alternative names: Dumplings
- Type: Filled dumpling
- Place of origin: Korea
- Associated cuisine: Korean cuisine Korean royal court cuisine
- Similar dishes: Gyoza; Jiǎozi; Khinkali; Manti; Momo; Pierogi; Pelmeni; Buuz

Korean name
- Hangul: 만두
- Hanja: 饅頭
- RR: mandu
- MR: mandu
- IPA: [man.du]

Mandu (Korean: 만두), or mandoo, are dumplings in Korean cuisine. Mandu can be steamed, boiled, pan-fried, or deep-fried. The styles also vary across regions in the Korean Peninsula. Mandu were long part of Korean royal court cuisine, but are now found in supermarkets, restaurants, and snack places such as pojangmacha and bunsikjip throughout South Korea.

== Names and etymology ==
The name mandu is cognate with the names of similar types of meat-filled dumplings along the Silk Road in Central Asia, such as Uyghur manta (مانتا), Tajik mantu, Turkish mantı, Kazakh mänti (мәнті), Uzbek manti, Afghan mantu, and Armenian mantʿi (մանթի). Chinese mántou (馒头; 饅頭) is also considered a cognate; historically, the term referred to meat-filled dumplings, but it now denotes steamed buns without filling.

Korean mandu encompasses both thin-wrapper dumplings, that are occasionally also called gyoja (교자; 餃子), which are equivalent and cognate to Chinese jiǎozi (饺子; 餃子) and Sino-Japanese gyōza (餃子), and steamed bun-type dumplings, which are closer in form to Chinese bāozi (包子) and Mongolian buuz (бууз). The latter are not referred to by the would-be cognate poja (포자; 包子) in Korean; instead, they are usually called wang-mandu (왕만두), where wang means "king", as in "king-sized". Unlike Chinese bāozi, which may contain either sweet or savoury fillings, Korean wang-mandu are savoury. Steamed buns with sweet fillings in Korean cuisine are known by other names, such as jjinppang and hoppang, and are not regarded as mandu.

== History ==
Mandu are believed to have been first brought to Korea from the Yuan dynasty in the 14th century during the reign of the Goryeo dynasty.

The state religion of Goryeo was Buddhism, which discouraged the consumption of meat. The Mongolian incursion into Goryeo relaxed the religious prohibition against consuming meat, and mandu was among the newly imported dishes that included meat.

The first record of dumplings in Korea are seen in the text Hyouyŏlchŏn (효우열전; 孝友列傳) in the history text Goryeosa. In the text, dumplings were said to be made by a naturalized Khitan person during the reign of King Myeongjong of Goryeo.. When his father became ill, the doctor said, 'If you eat your son's meat, you can cure your illness.' Then, he cut off his own thigh meat, mixed it with other ingredients, made dumplings, and fed it to his father. After that, his father was cured. In 1185, the king heard the story of his filial piety and ordered the ministers to discuss how to reward him. He erected Hongsalmun Gate to commend him and recorded this into historical records.

Another possibility is mandu came to Korea at a much earlier period from the Middle East through the Silk Road. Historians point out many cuisines based on wheat, such as dumplings and noodles, which originated from Mesopotamia and gradually spread from there. It also spread east along the Silk Road, leaving many versions of mandu throughout Central and East Asia.

A Goryeo-era folk song, "Ssanghwajeom", tells a story of a mandu shop (ssanghwa meaning 'dumplings', and jeom meaning 'shop') run by a foreigner, probably of Central Asian origin.

== Varieties ==
If the dumplings are grilled or pan-fried, they are called gun-mandu (군만두); when steamed, jjin-mandu (찐만두); and when boiled, mul-mandu (물만두). In South Korea, mandu styles vary in different regions of the country. In particular, Pulmuone is releasing cheese dumplings, sweet seed dumplings with sugar and spicy dumplings.

- Mul-mandu (물만두) means "boiled mandu".
- Gun-mandu (군만두) is pan-fried mandu. It is derived from guun-mandu 구운만두=>군만두 to mean "panned" dumplings.'.
- Jjin-mandu (찐만두) is steamed, either in a traditional bamboo steamer or modern versions.
- Gullin-mandu (굴린만두), also called gulmandu, is a variety of mandu in a ball shape without a covering. It is mainly eaten in summer.
- Wang mandu (왕만두) is a bun stuffed with pork and vegetables, similar to the Chinese baozi.
- Pyeonsu (편수), mandu stuffed with vegetables in a rectangular shape. It is mainly eaten in summer and a local specialty of Kaesong, North Korea.
- Eo-mandu (어만두), mandu wrapped with sliced fish fillet. It was originally eaten in the Korean royal court and yangban (noble class) families.
- Saengchi-mandu (생치만두), mandu stuffed with pheasant meat, beef, and tofu, that was eaten in the Korean royal court and the Seoul area during winter.
- Seongnyu-mandu (석류만두), literally "pomegranate dumpling" because of the shape.
- So-mandu (소만두), mandu stuffed with only vegetables, which were originally eaten in Buddhist temples.
- Gyuasang (규아상), mandu stuffed with shredded cucumber and minced beef in the shape of a sea cucumber. It is mainly eaten in the summer.
- Kimchi-mandu (김치만두), mandu with stuffing which contains kimchi. The addition of kimchi gives it a spicier taste compared to other mandu.
- Napjak-mandu (납작만두), a Daegu specialty. As the name suggests (napjak in Korean means 'flat'), the mandu is not as plump as the other types. A small amount of chopped glass noodles and vegetables go inside the mandu. The mandu is then boiled once and pan-fried once, finished off with a dipping sauce made with soy sauce and red pepper powder, and garnished on top with vegetables.
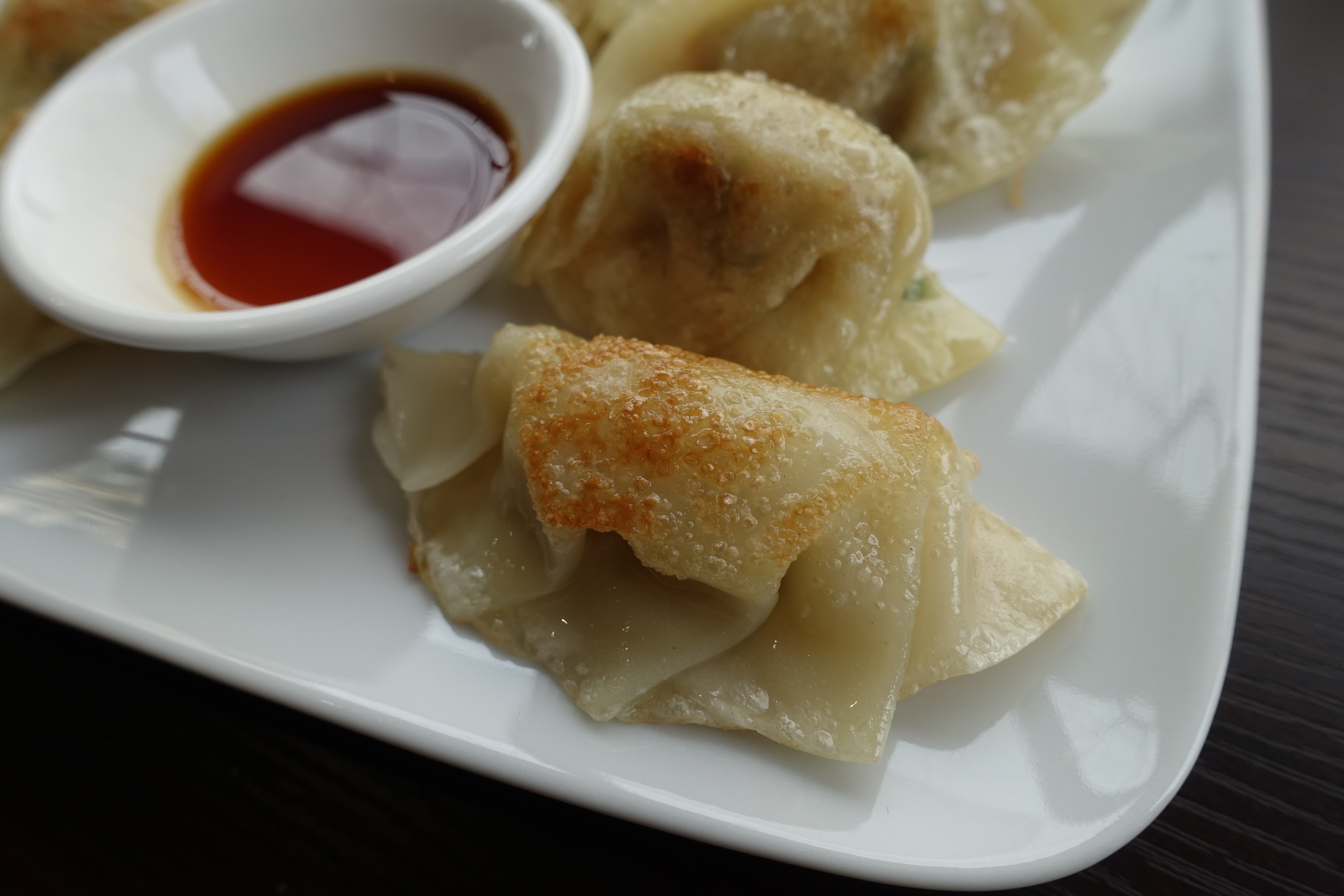
Gun-mandu (pan-fried dumplings)

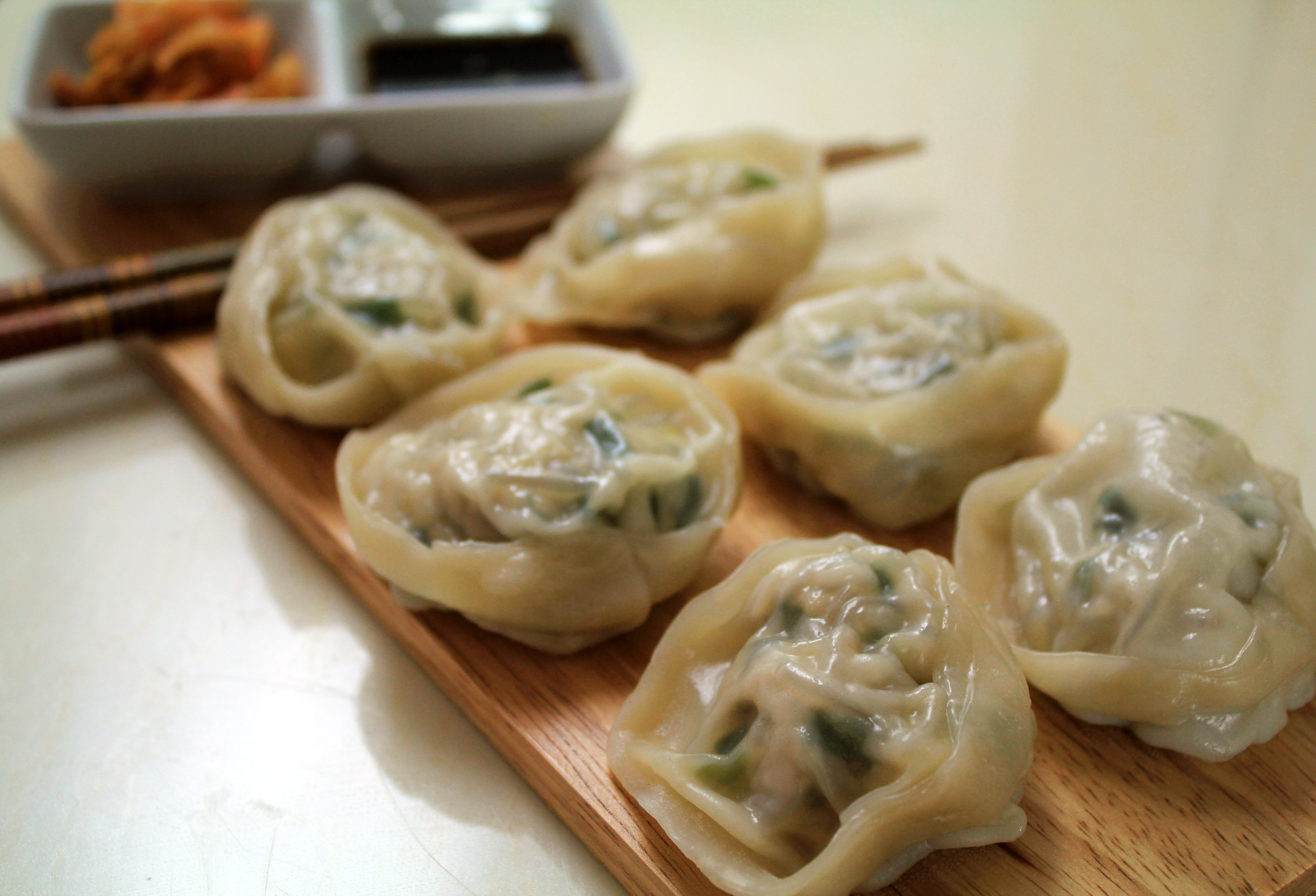
Jjin-mandu (steamed dumplings)

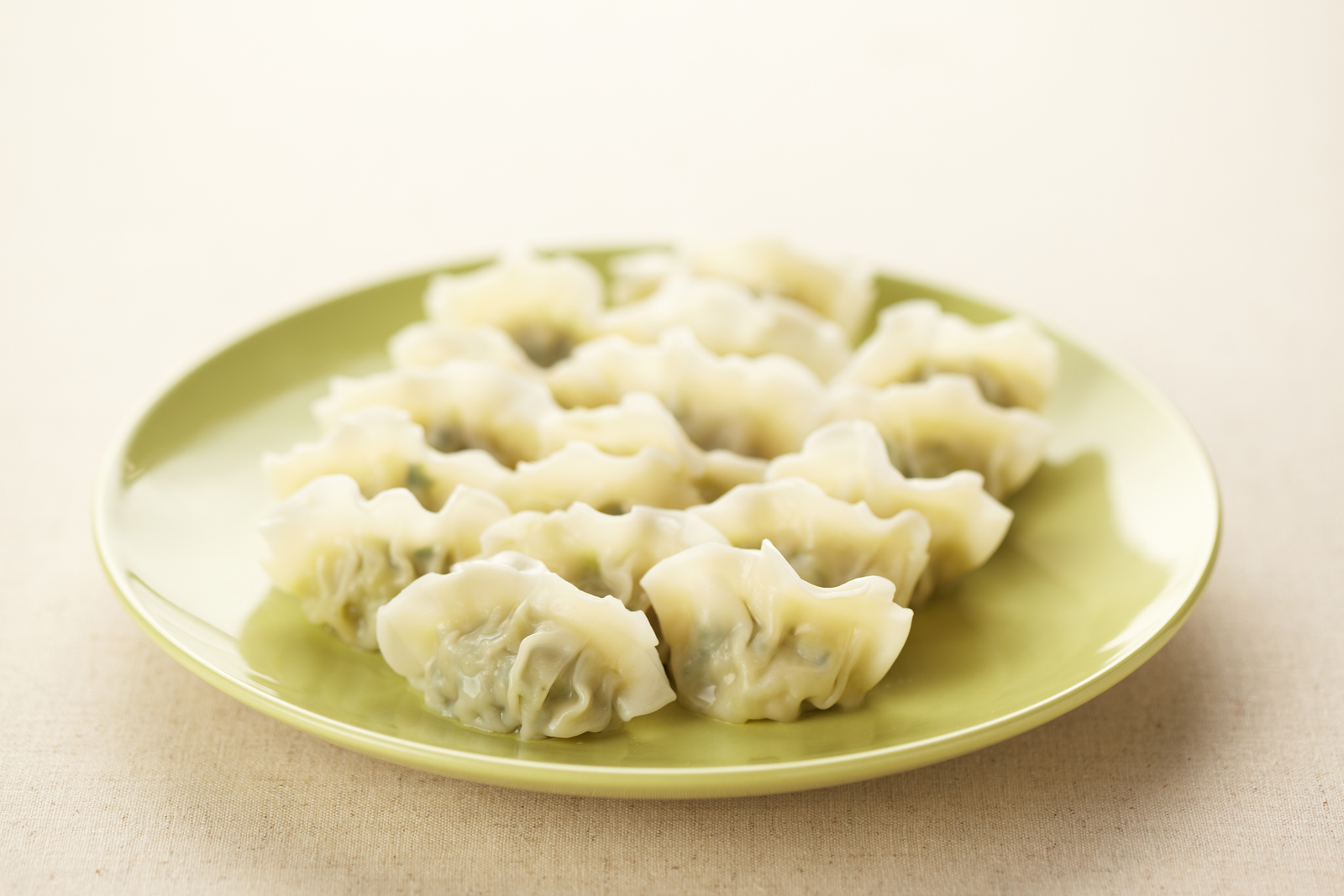
Mul-mandu (boiled dumplings)

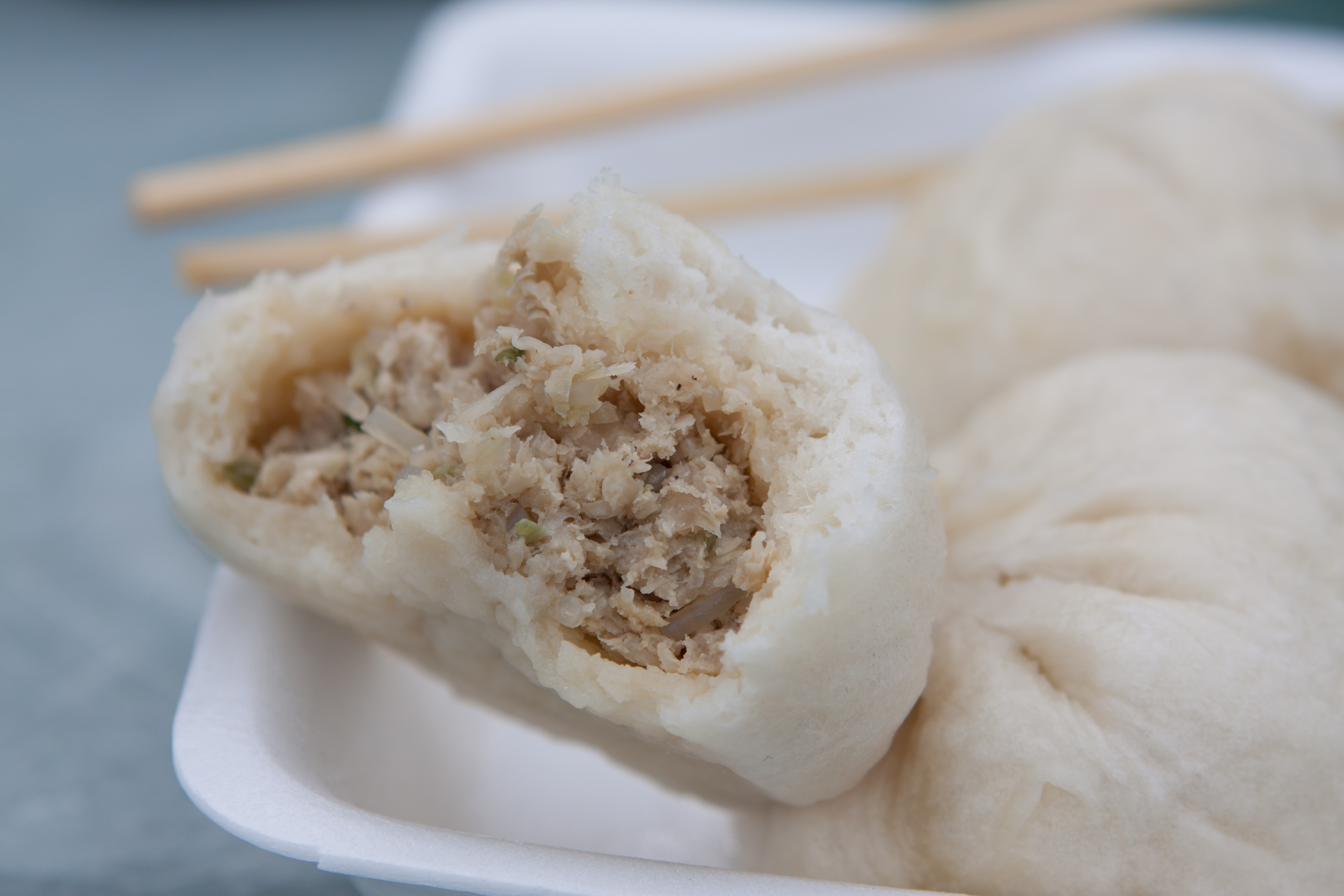
Wang-mandu (steamed bun dumplings)

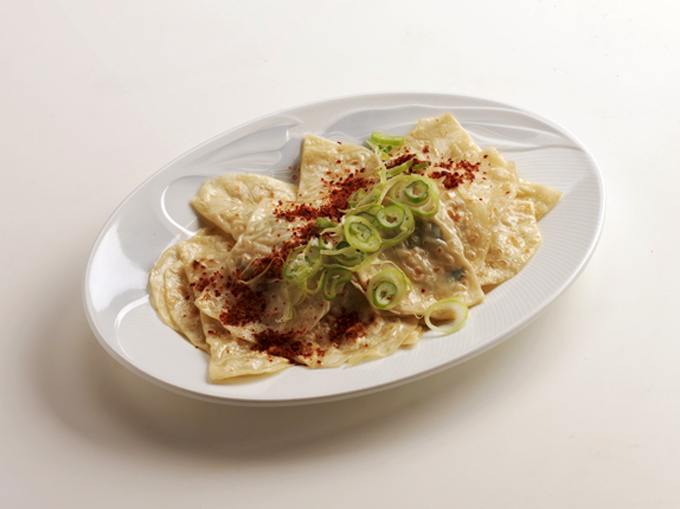
Daegu napjak-mandu (flat dumplings)

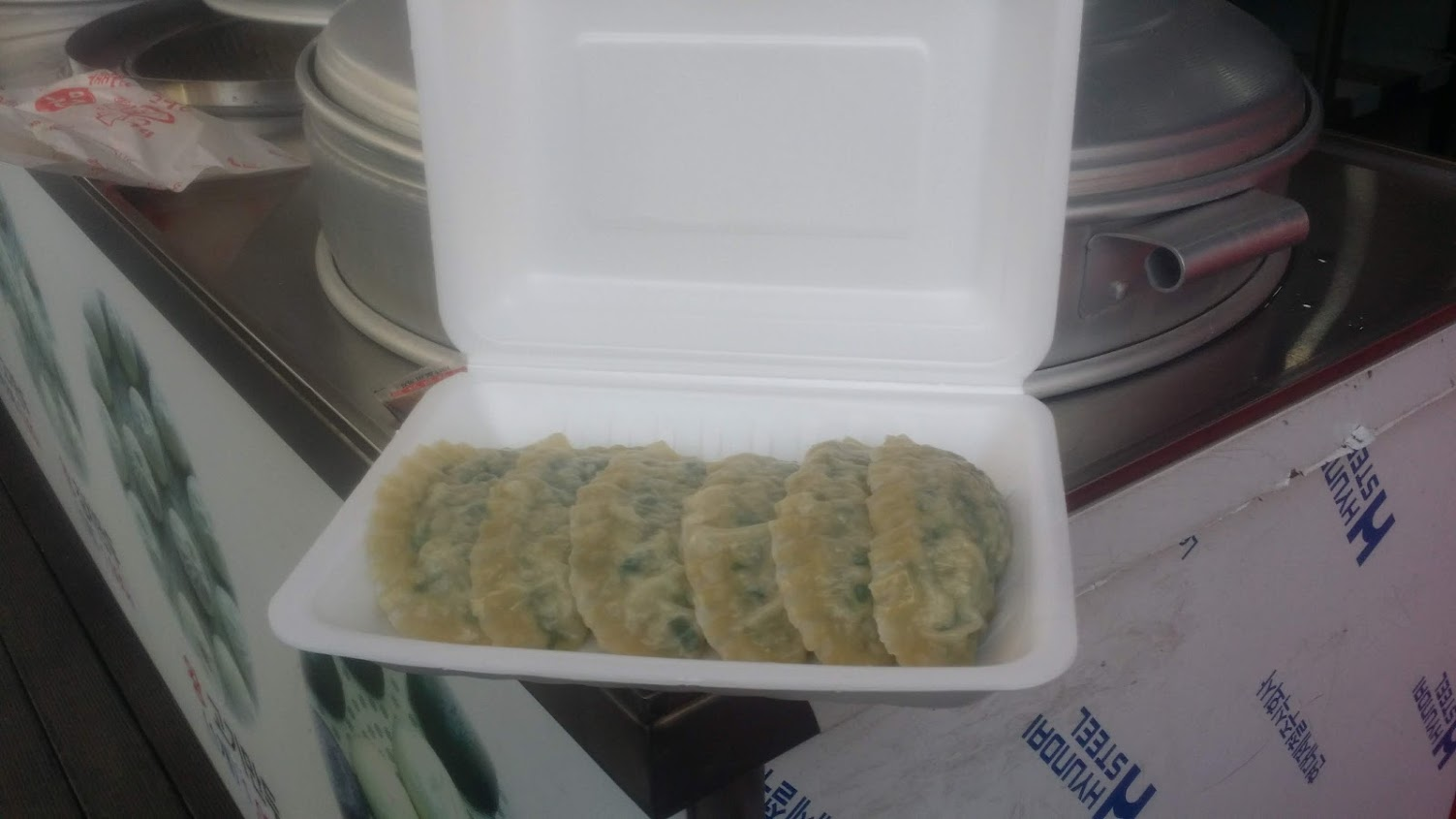
Common dumplings sold in Korean street restaurants

== Dishes made with mandu ==
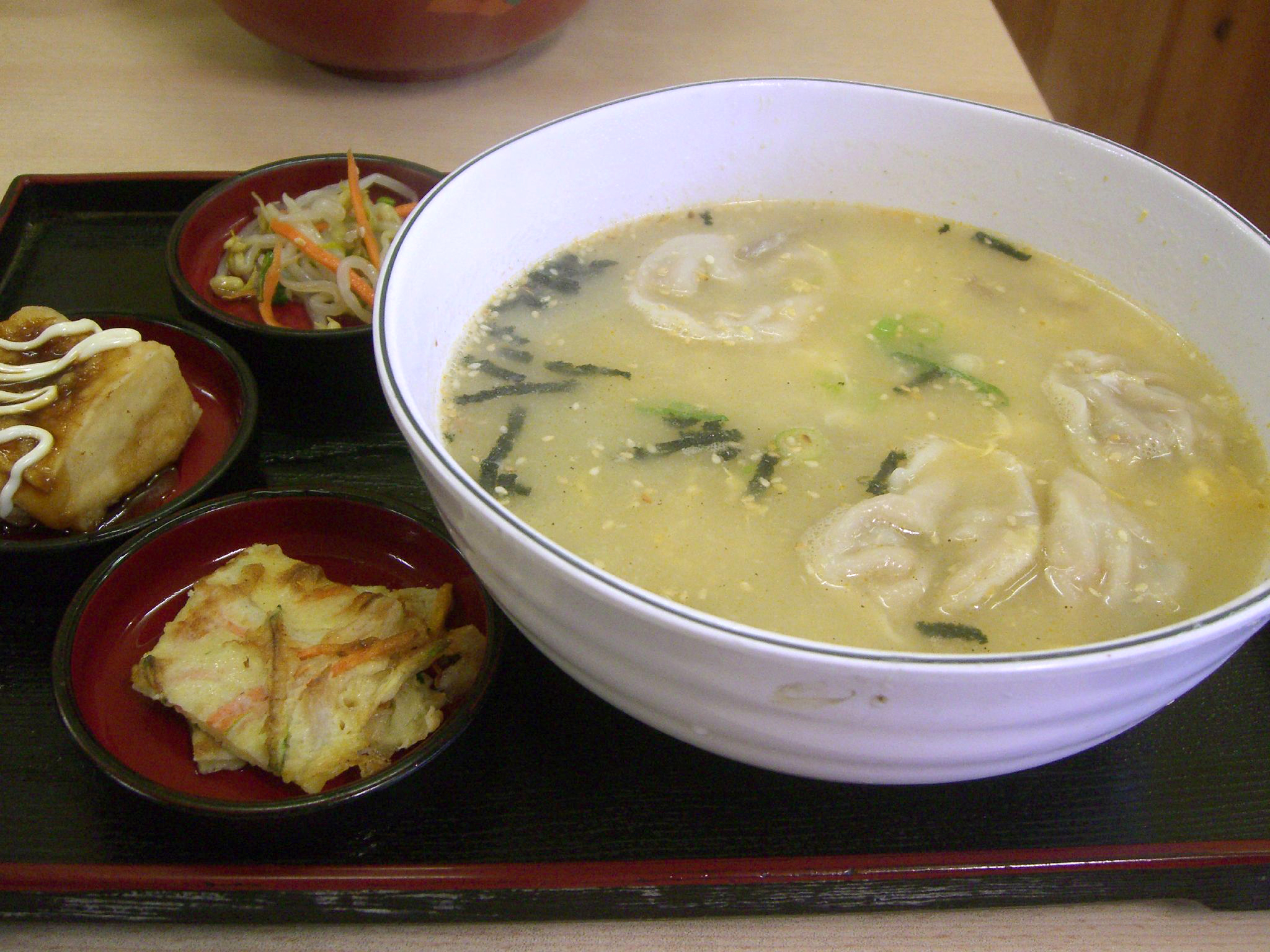
Manduguk

Manduguk is a variety of Korean soup (guk) made with mandu in beef broth. In the Korean royal court, the dish was called byeongsi (병시; 餠匙) while in the Ŭmsik timibang, a 17th-century cookbook, it was called seokryutang (석류탕).

== Similar food ==
In Korean cuisine, mandu generally denotes a type of filled dumpling similar to the Mongolian buuz, a Tibetan-Nepalese momo and Turkic mantı, and some variations are similar to the Chinese jiaozi and the Japanese gyoza.

They are similar to pelmeni and pierogi in some Slavic cultures.

== In popular culture ==
- In the 2003 South Korean film Oldboy, the protagonist Oh Dae-Su is fed a steady diet of fried mandu, the food that he detests the most, while he is imprisoned. After he is released, he visits various restaurants serving the dish to get clues and determine where he was held captive.
- Wonder Girls member Ahn Sohee is often referred to as Mandu due to her cheeks resembling the shape of mandu.
- In the 2020 DreamWorks animated series Kipo and the Age of Wonderbeasts, Kipo finds a mutated pig and names it Mandu because it resembles the dumpling.

== See also ==
- Kozhukkatta
- Mandu-gwa
- Modak
- Manti
- List of steamed foods
