= Mi-iuy croaker =

Conservation status
- Data Deficient (IUCN 3.1)

Scientific classification
- Kingdom: Animalia
- Phylum: Chordata
- Class: Actinopterygii
- Order: Acanthuriformes
- Family: Sciaenidae
- Genus: Miichthys; S.-Y. Lin, 1938
- Species: M. miiuy

Binomial name
- Miichthys miiuy (Basilewsky, 1855)

Synonyms
- Sciaena miiuy Basilewsky, 1855; Argyrosomus miiuy (Basilewsky, 1855); Otolithus fauvelii Peters, 1881; Nibea imbricata Matsubara, 1937; Miichthys imbricatus (Matsubara, 1937)

Species of ray-finned fish

The mi-iuy croaker (Miichthys miiuy; Chinese: 米魚／鮸; pinyin: mǐyú／miǎn), or brown croaker, is a species marine ray-finned fish belonging to the family Sciaenidae, the drums and croakers.

== Etymology ==
The English common name, the generic name and the specific epithet are all derived from the Chinese common name 米魚 (mǐyú).

== Distribution and habitat ==
This demersal fish occurs in the northwestern Pacific Ocean from western Japan to the East China Sea, where it is found in coastal waters over sand and mud substrates.

== Relationship with humans ==
It is used in traditional Chinese medicine and as a food fish.
