= Globe Pequot Press =

American book publisher

- Parent company: The Globe Pequot Publishing Group
- Founded: 1947
- Country of origin: United States
- Headquarters location: Essex, Connecticut
- Distribution: National Book Network
- Official website: globepequot.com

Globe Pequot is a book publisher and distributor of outdoor recreation and leisure titles that publishes 500 new titles. Globe Pequot was acquired by Morris Communications in 1997. Lyons Press was acquired in 2001. It was sold to Rowman & Littlefield in 2014. After Rowman & Littlefield sold its academic publishing division to Bloomsbury Publishing in 2024 and with it included its own name, the holding company changed its name to The Globe Pequot Publishing Group, took the name of Globe Pequot.

== Imprints ==
Globe Pequot publishes several imprints, including Prometheus Books, Lyons Press, FalconGuides, Knack, and Insiders' Guide.
