= Suunjapbang =

Korean cookbook, published circa 1540

Suunjapbang (Korean: 수운잡방; Hanja: 需雲雜方) is a cookbook written by Kim Yu (김유; 金綏; 1481 – 1552) in about 1540, during the early period of the Joseon period of Korea.

Regarding its title, suun (需雲) means dignified food culture, and japbang (雜方) means various methods, so suunjapbang means ways of making food fit for a man of refined taste. Books one and two include a total of 121 recipes from Andong, North Gyeongsang Province, including methods for making alcoholic drinks. Suunjapbang consists of 25 pages, and its manuscript is written in Chinese characters. The second book is thought to have been added by Kim-yu's descendants. The book is considered an important record of the food of that period.

== Composition ==
The book describes a total of 121 recipes. The front section seems to have been written by Kim-yu, while the latter part was written in a cursive hand presumed to have belonged to his descendants. The recipes are therefore divided into books one and two, as follows:

=== Book One ===
(Note: The names listed below are generally written in the order of romanization (hangul, hanja).)

- Alcoholic Beverages

Samhaeju (삼해주; 三亥酒), samoju (삼오주; 三亥酒), 2 kinds of byeokhyangju (벽향주; 碧香酒), manjeonhyangju (만전향주; 萬殿香酒), dugangju (두강주; 杜康酒), childuju (칠두주; 七斗酒), 2 kinds of sogokju (소곡주; 小麯酒), gamhyangju (감향주; 甘香酒), baekjaju (백자주; 柏子酒), hodoju (호도주; 胡桃酒), sangshilju (상실주; 桑實酒), 2 kinds of hailyakju (하일약주; 夏日藥酒), samilju (삼일주; 三日酒), hailcheongju (하일청주; 夏日淸酒), 3 kinds of hailjeomju (하일점주; 夏日粘酒), jinmaeksoju (진맥소주), nokpaju (녹파주; 綠波酒), ililju (일일주; 一日酒), doinju (도인주; 桃仁酒), baekhwaju (백화주; 百花酒), yuhwaju (유화주), ihwajujogukbeop (이화주조국법; 梨花酒造麴法), 2 kinds of ihwaju (이화주; 梨花酒), oduju (오두주; 五斗酒), hamyangju (함양주), baekchulju (백출주; 白朮酒), jeongyangju (정양주; 丁香酒), shibilju (십일주; 十日酒), dongyangju (동양주; 東陽酒), bogyeonggaju (보경가주; 寶卿家酒), donghaju (동하주; 冬夏酒), namgyeongju (남경주; 南京酒), jinsangju (진상주; 進上酒), byeoulju (별주; 別酒)

- Vinegars and Soybean paste

How to make gori (고리), goricho (고리초; 古里酢), sajeolcho (사절초; 四節醋), another byeongjeongcho (병정초; 丙丁酢), changpocho (창포초), moktongcho (목통초), 2 kinds of jeupjeo (즙저; 汁菹), jeupjang (즙장, a soybean paste made of eggplant, cucumber and other vegetables)

- Kimchi

Cheongyochimchaebeop (청교침채법), chimbaekchae (침백채; 沈白菜), goundaegimchi (고운대김치), chimdongagujangbeop (침동아구장법), 2 kinds of gwajeo (과저, 瓜菹, cucumber kimchi), sugwajeo (수과저), nogwajeo (노과저), chijeo (치저, 雉菹, pheasant kimchi), nabjojeo (납조저; 臘糟菹)

- Sowing and Storage

How to store living eggplants; how to plant cucumber seeds, ginger, butterburs, oriental melon seeds, and yeongeum (연금); eoshikhaebeop (어식해법); how to store pears, radish kimchi, green onion kimchi, and dongchimi(동치미)

- Jeonggwa (Korean: 정과; Hanja: 正果, fruits preserved in honey) and dasik

Dongajeonggwa (동아정과), how to make tofu, tarak (타락, 駝酪, milk), yeot, 3 kinds of jojangbeop (조장법; 造醬法), cheonggeunjang (청근장, 菁根醬, soybean paste made of turnip), gihwajang (기화장), jeonshi (전시), bongnigunjeonshibang (봉리군전시방), deodoekjwaban (더덕좌반), yukmyeon (육면), and sujangbeop (수장법)

== See also ==
- Ŭmsik timibang
- Tomundaejak
- Siŭijŏnsŏ
- Chŭngbo sallim kyŏngje
- Kyuhap ch'ongsŏ
