= Chang Kyehyang =

Korean writer (1598–1680)

- portrait
- Born: November 24, 1598; Andong, Gyeongsang Province, Joseon
- Died: July 7, 1680 (aged 81); Seokbochon, Yeongyang County, Gyeongsang Province, Joseon
- Other names: Jang Kye-hyang, Chŏngbuin Andong Chang Ssi, Chŏngbuin Chang Ssi, Korean: 정부인 안동 장씨
- Known for: one of the first cookbooks written by a woman in Korea, first cookbook using the Korean alphabet
- Notable work: Ŭmsik timibang (Korean: 음식디미방)

Korean name
- Hangul: 장계향
- Hanja: 張桂香
- RR: Jang Gyehyang
- MR: Chang Kyehyang

Chang Kyehyang (Korean: 장계향; Hanja: 張桂香; November 24, 1598 – July 7, 1680) was a Korean noblewoman who studied Hangul calligraphy and wrote poetry in her youth. She was also a painter and philanthropist of the Joseon (Chosŏn) era. She wrote one of the first cookbooks in Korea penned by a woman, which was also the first written in the Korean alphabet (Hangul). The text in which it was written is significant, as the official script at that time was Chinese. It is also significant as the book uniquely presents a means of preparing food, expanding the study of food from its medicinal properties to actual preparation.

== Early life ==
Chang Kyehyang was born on November 24, 1598, in Andong, Gyeongsang Province, Korea, the only daughter of Chang Hŭnghyo and Lady Kwŏn of the Andong Kwŏn clan (Korean: 안동권씨). Chang's father was a well-known Neo-Confucian scholar, who taught many students in his home. Besides listening to their studies, Chang would snoop in her father's library and study books, writing, and philosophy. During the Joseon era, education of women emerged, though it was by far still a male dominated domain and restricted mainly to the upper classes. Typically in the period, women studied Confucian philosophy and morality, but pursuit of education for women was not concerned with teaching practical skills. By the time she was ten, she had mastered writing and by thirteen was writing poetry. Some of her early works included "Ode to the Saint", "Sound of Rain", and "Crane White Hair", all of which showed a mature vision of life and impressed her father. During this time, she also painted works and created embroideries, though few survive. When she was 19, Chang married Yi Simyŏng as his second wife after being introduced to him by her father.

== Later life ==
After Chang married, the couple first lived in the seaport town of Yeonghae. Later, they built a house in a mountain village in North Gyeongsang Province named Seokgye, famous for being the home town of the novelist Yi Mun-yol. She raised her own seven children as well as the two children from her husband's first marriage. During the Second Manchu invasion of Korea in 1636, she opened her home to assist those who were suffering from deprivations during the war. She also planted an orchard of acorn trees so that the poor would always have a source of food.

Because of a postscript written by Chang about her age and waning vision, it is generally assumed that she wrote her cookbook in her later years in the 1670s. While instructional books about food had begun to appear in Korea during the sixteenth century, most were written in encyclopedic language focusing on the medicinal properties of food and followed the custom of using classical Chinese in the text. Chang's cookbook, Ŭmsik timibang (Korean: 음식디미방) was written in the Korean alphabet. Often credited as the first cookbook in the Hangul script, it contains recipes and instructions for using utensils to cook 146 dishes, including beverages, dumplings, meats, noodles, seafood, soups, and vegetables. Chang was explicit in her instructions of food and drink preparation, showing that she had knowledge of cooking processes, which made her cookbook unique from previously created volumes. Ŭmsik timibang may not be the first cookbook written by a woman, as one containing 20 recipes by Lady Ch'oe, who died in 1660, may have preceded Chang's book. Ch'oe's first name is unknown. It was common in the Joseon era for women to be known by their region of origin and their surname.

== Death and legacy ==
Chang died on 7 July 1680 in Seokbochon village in Yeongyang County of the Gyeongsang Province, Her cookbook was not printed in her lifetime, but was found in the home of Yi Karam (Korean: 李葛菴) in 1960 and subsequently published in its entirety by Kim Sayŏp. Her writings show that some women challenged convention in the Joseon age and her cookbook is a valuable tool which moved cooking from the realm of family members teaching other family members into a field of study. The dishes that she designed are featured at the Korea House Restaurant of central Seoul's Jung District. The Ministry of Tourism has offered tours of significant sites mentioned and related to the book and it has a dedicated page as part of the Google Cultural Institute.
