= Sanga yorok =

1459 Korean cookbook by Jeon soon

Sanga Yorok (Korean: 산가요록; Hanja: 山家要錄) is a Korean cook book written in hanja in about 1459 by the royal family doctor, Jeon soon. The work also incorporates descriptions of farming. The terminology means "records for farming villages".

Sanga Yorok precedes by 80 years the book from Kim Yoo's Suwoon Jipbang. It deals with 239 kinds of cooking methods for liquors, juk, guk, tteok, desserts and tofu-related dishes.

The writer, Jeon soon worked for medical care of royal family during Munjong and Sejo of Joseon to record another book, Sikryo Chanyo, the first-ever recorded Korean book for dietary treatment.

The importance of the writing can be found from numerous methodologies of dishes of 38 kinds of kimchi and 63 traditional breweries. For shikhye, 7 kinds were written using various ingredients like fish, pork rinds, bamboo shoots, bellflower and even pheasant.

The writing work is valued for appreciating 15th century culinary culture, additionally for description of designing greenhouse.
