= Tomundaejak =

1611 Korean food book

Tomundaejak (Korean: 도문대작; Hanja: 屠門大嚼) is a book of food criticism written by Hŏ Kyun in 1611. It is included in the Seongseobubugo (성서부부고; 惺所覆瓿藁; a collection of 26 books and 12 volumes). This book was written during Hŏ Kyun's exile. He was exiled to Hamyel (now Iksan), a seaside district in North Jeolla Province. While eating the coarse food there, he started to describe the delicious food that he ate before. Domun (도문; 屠門) means the door of the butcher's, and daejak (대작; 大嚼) means chewing something loudly. So the title Tomundaejak means licking one's lips by the butcher's door, thinking of the meat that one cannot now eat.

This book refers to 11 sorts of tteok, 30 types of fruit, 5 kinds of meat, 40 varieties of seafood, 25 sorts of vegetables and 5 other foods, for a total of 117 foods. It names those foods' ingredients' groups, names, specific localities of production, origins, bulk dates, production seasons, processing methods, shape, taste and so on.

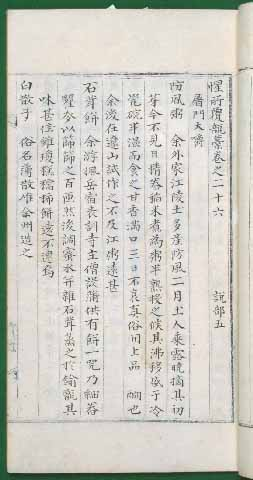
A page of the book

== Composition ==
Tomundaejak describes and comments on the best dishes from various regions and specialties from the eight provinces of Korea, and delicacies, vegetables, fruits and fish from various places in detail. These contents are divided largely into "Fruits," "Fish," and "Crops."

=== Fruits ===
It includes a total of 30 fruits, recording various kinds such as chestnuts and jujubes common in the Joseon period, and it informs the reader of their areas of production. Especially, it records 6 kinds of mandarins from Jeju: geumgyul (금귤; 金橘), gamgyul (감귤; 甘橘), cheonggyul (청귤; 靑橘), yugam (유감; 柚柑), yuja (유자; 柚子), and gamnyu (감류; 甘榴) (a type of persimmon).

=== Meat ===
It records rare foods like bear's paw, the tail and tongue of deer, pheasant meat, placenta of leopard and where they are produced.

=== Seafood ===
It records 40 varieties of seafood like carp, gray mullet, Chinese herring, sweetfish, cod, mackerel, ricefish, clams and crabs. It evaluates and records their taste and their production locales. (The list quoted in full:)

- The Han River: gray mullet, Korean sword fish, blowfish, Coreoperca herzi
- Yangpyeong: Kumrinoe
- Imcheon, Hanshan of Chungcheong, and Impie of Jeolla: Whitebait
- Asan: Yellow corvina
- The Yellow Sea: Zaha, Spiny lobster, Kodoueo, Herring, Croaker, Yellow corvina fish, fingerling, small octopus, Jineo
- Gangneung: Carp, Lenok, Sardine
- Samcheok: Crab (It is as big as small dog, straight as an arrow, and sweet tasting. It is usually made into jerky.)
- The Sea of Japan: Bangaeo, Salmon, Trout, Nuruchi, Halibut, flatfish, Sweetfish, Salted salmon eggs
- Northern areas: Trout, Paldaeo
- Heungddok, Buan of Jeolla: Squid, Douha
- Yeongnam: Eungueo
- Nyongbyon of Pyongan: Nulchi

=== Vegetables ===
It records a total of 26 kinds of vegetables like ginger, mustard, and their areas of production.

=== Jogwa ===
Jogwa (조과; 造果) is a word meaning all Korean traditional snack foods. People usually refer to them as hangwa to distinguish them from western-style cakes. People make yumilgwa (유밀과, 유과; 油蜜果, 油菓) for memorial services, feasts and treating guests. They are divided into yakgwa (약과; 藥果), daegye (대계; 大桂), jungbaeggi (중배끼; 中桂果), hongsanja (홍산자; 紅癎子), baeksanja (백산자; 白癎子), frozen desserts (빙과; 氷果), gwagwa (과과; 瓜果), bongjeopgwa (봉접과; 蜂蝶果), mandu-gwa (만두과; 饅頭果), and so on.

It records jeungbyeong (증병; 蒸餠), wolbyeong (월병; 月餠), sambyeong (삼병; 蔘餠), songoyumil (송고유밀, 송기떡; 松膏油蜜), jabyeong (자병, 전병; 煮餠), and so on in the section of Seoeul (Not Seoul).

It records yaksik (약식; 藥食) which was the food that was given to crows on the 15th day of the Lunar New Year. Chinese people learned this recipe and they named it goyeoban.
