= Ŭmsik timibang =

17th-century Korean cookbook

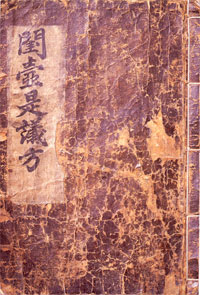
- Cover of Ŭmsik timibang

Korean name
- Hangul: 음식디미방 / 규곤시의방
- Hanja: 飮食知味方 / 閨壼是議方
- RR: Eumsik dimibang / Gyugon siuibang
- MR: Ŭmsik timibang / Kyugon siŭibang

Eumsik dimibang (음식디미방; 飮食知味方) or Gyugon sieuibang (규곤시의방) is a Korean cookbook written around 1670 by Jang Gyehyang (1598–1680) during the Joseon period. Written primarily in Hangul, it serves as a record of cooking, brewing, food preservation, and related household techniques practiced in elite households of the Andong–Yeongyang region during the Joseon period. Chang, belonging to the yangban class, stated that she intended the work to transmit this knowledge to her daughters and daughters-in-law.

The work is considered an important source for the study of seventeenth-century Korean food culture and language. Its vernacular preserves terminology used during the Joseon period relating to ingredients, utensils, culinary processes, and other aspects of everyday life.

== See also ==
- Sieuijeonseo, a 19th-century Korean cookbook
- Gyuhab Chongseo, a Korean women's encyclopedia
