= Great cake =

Large historic cakes

Four great cakes at a wedding procession, hung in slings by the neck. Detail from A Fête at Bermondsey (1571) by Marcus Gheeraerts the Elder

Great cakes were enormous yeast cakes that were eaten in Britain from the early modern period, and in America into the late 19th century on special occasions. The culinary historian Karen Hess likens their form to babka.

== In Britain ==
A typical example of the great cake in Britain during the early modern period would measure 3 or 4 feet (0.9 or 1.2 m) across and weigh around 35 pounds (16 kg). Great cakes were made with expensive ingredients—sugar, eggs, cream, spices, the most prized wheat, Corinth currants—and were often coated with a thick, hard icing made with egg whites and sugar. The amounts of currants in early great cakes were substantial, though as the years went by, their quantities reduced. As a yeast cake, the dough was kneaded.

Great cakes were prepared in very large ovens by the wealthy for celebrations, particularly weddings. Commoners could experience them during some of the various festivals held in the British countryside during the period. These corresponded to days of religious significance and agricultural milestones, and were often supported by Anglican churches and large manors, which would bake great cakes for more extravagant celebrations. During the Elizabethan period, great cakes were leavened with barm, the yeasty foam skimmed from beer as it ferments. Their taste, according to the food writer Stephen Schmidt, would have been like "good raisin bread", making a stark contrast to the standard fare of coarse breads made with cereals and pulses such as oats and peas.

Recipes for great cakes were common in British cookbooks of the 17th and 18th centuries. One, included in Elinor Fettiplace's Receipt Book (1604), was also titled Fruit Loaf. A later recipe is included by Gervase Markham in The English Huswife (1615), including cream that Markham says should be left "on the fire till the cold bee taken away". Several local versions of great cakes emerged in Britain during the early modern period. One version that emerged in London during the 17th century was the Wood Street Cake. As a boy, King James II and VII was a fan, and was received with Wood Street Cake upon escaping his incarceration at St James's Palace. An early recipe for a Wood Street Cake describes a dessert flavoured with cloves, mace, musk, and ambergris.

== In America ==
Early British colonists brought great cake to the modern United States, where it featured in celebrations including Thanksgiving and university commencement days, but they were most closely associated with Election Day, an event held in Connecticut in the spring wherein members of the Massachusetts Bay Company met to elect officers. By 1631, this event was marked by sermons and the consumption of election cake with election beer. (Note: Hackett Fischer gives the month as April; Stavely and Fitzgerald May.) In the Puritan tradition of the day, the name "elect" also had connotations of suffrage being restricted to the theologically "elect".

Just as they were in Britain, great cakes were served in America at weddings and funerals. Samuel Sewall, among the judges during the Salem witch trials, described and praised such cakes, telling of how they could be eaten with cheese and posset—a drink of spiced, sweetened milk curdled with wine or ale, served hot. Recipes appear in several cookbooks of the period. Amelia Simmons included a recipe for a 100-pound election cake in the second edition of her cookbook American Cookery (1796); Martha Washington's collection of recipes has four great cakes. One reads: (Note: Karen Hess gives a rough conversion of the flour [flowre] as 32 cups.)

Take a peck of flowre & put to it 10 eggs beaten; take out 3 of yᵉ whites. put in nutmegg, cinamond, cloves, & mace, of each a quarter of an ounce; A full quart of Ale barme, & mingle with yᵉ flowre two pound of fresh butter. when it is allmoste kneaded, put 6 spoonfulls of hot water to it, & 10 pound of currans, & halfe a pownd of sugar beaten. let it ly a while by yᵉ fire to rise, & then bake it.

In another of Washington's recipes for great cake, rosewater and possit are included. Unlike the typical possit, this is a custard the temperature of blood, to which sherry has been added, and marks the recipe as older than Washington's other preparations. The culinary historian Karen Hess described the cake produced by this preparation as tasty—buttery and not particularly sweet, with a dense crumb and pleasing texture.

During the colonial period, great cakes in America were likely cooked on the hearth, and were not contained in a cake tin. They continued to be made in the US into the late 19th century, their persistence driven by nostalgia and practicality. At weddings, a large cake was able to serve many guests, and because it contained yeast, it did not have to have air physically incorporated into the batter like a plum cake.

== See also ==
- Wedding cake

== Sources ==
- Hackett Fischer, David (1989). Albion's Seed: Four British Folkways in America. New York: Oxford University Press. ISBN 0-19-503794-4.
- Hess, Karen (1981). Martha Washington's Booke of Cookery. New York, London: Columbia University Press. ISBN 0-231-04930-7.
- Patent, Greg (2002). Baking in America: Traditional and Contemporary Favorites from the Past 200 Years. Boston, Massachusetts: Houghton Mifflin Company. ISBN 0-618-04831-6.
- Schmidt, Stephen (2015). "Celebration cakes". In Goldstein, Darra (ed.). The Oxford Companion to Sugar and Sweets. Oxford, Oxfordshire & New York, London: Oxford University Press. ISBN 978-0-19-931339-6.
- Stavely, Keith; Fitzgerald, Kathleen (2004). America's Founding Food: The Story of New England Cooking. Chapel Hill, North Carolina & London: The University of North Carolina Press. ISBN 0-8078-2894-7.
- Swinburne, Layinka (March 2012). "The Wood Street Cake". Petits Propos Culinaires. 95: 56–73. doi:10.1558/ppc.28641.
- Vester, Katharina (2015). A Taste of Power: Food and American Identities. Oakland, California: University of California Press. ISBN 978-0-520-28497-5.
