= Manus Christi =

Medieval sweetmeat

From the Middle Ages through the end of the 18th century, references to and recipes for a sweet called manus Christi (lit. 'the hand of Christ') appeared across a range of European documents. Descriptions of this food ranged widely and were never exactly alike, though in its most typical description, manus Christi was a hard, sugar sweet. At other times, texts describe a liquid, and in others still a type of marzipan. In its hard, sugar candy form, flavours of cinnamon, rosewater, and violet were often used, accompanying other inclusions such as crushed gemstones, flakes of silver, or more often, gold.

Manus Christi was typically consumed as a medicine with a goal of preventing ill health, rather than healing the sick. The habit was described in the Elizabethan era in the saying "To preserve nature, to eat a mornings. The yolk of an egg with Manus Christi." From this practice, food writer Tim Richardson describes a commonality of manus Christi being "medicines based on crystallised sugar", united in "their expensiveness and their deliciousness". References to manus Christi often appeared in England, including in descriptions of the common stocks of Henry VIII's apothecary, but also appear in Paris, and later in the Americas in a recipe compilation passed on to first lady Martha Washington.

The meaning of the name manus Christi is unknown, said by food historian Laura Mason to have "never been adequately explained", while noting that to 16th-century Europeans, such an explicitly religious name would not have appeared as unusual to their modern counterparts. This, according to Mason, was because religion was far more integrated into daily life, and because in Southern Europe, sweets were associated with Catholics due to their production and sale by Catholic religious communities including monasteries and nunneries.

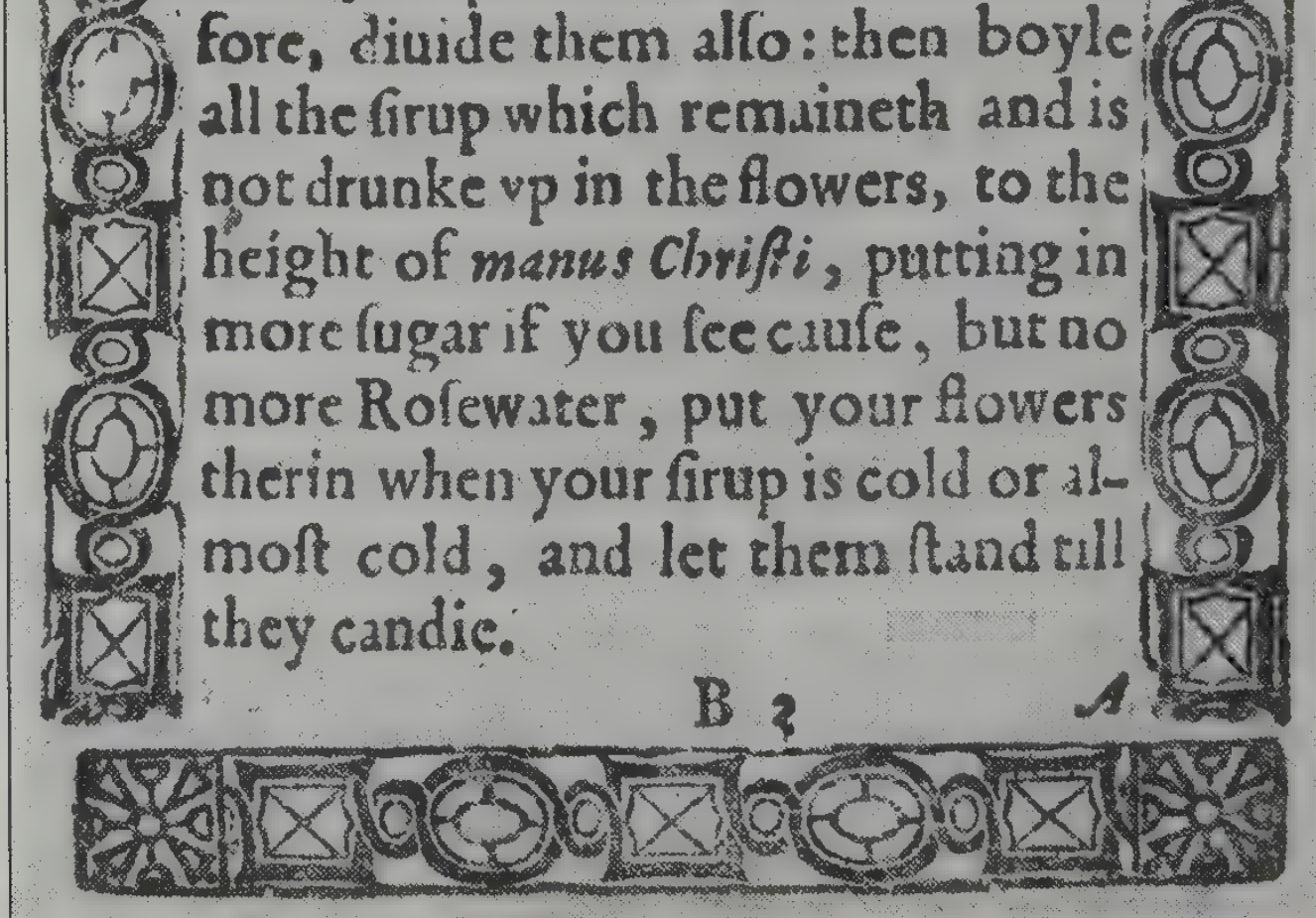
A reference to boiling syrup "to the height of manus Christ" in Hugh Plat's 1607 Delightes for Ladies

Apart from references to the sweet, through this period into the 16th century, texts used the phrase manus Christi height to refer to a stage of cooking sugar. A theory for the etymology, relayed by historian Karen Hess as an "ingenious and delightful explanation", says the phrase originates in the resemblance of a gesture in testing the sugar to that of Christian religious leaders blessing sacramental wine and bread.

== See also ==
- Confectionery in the English Renaissance
- Medieval cuisine

== Sources ==
- Davidson, Alan (2014). "Manus Christi". In Davidson, Alan; Jaine, Tom (eds.). The Oxford Companion to Food (3rd ed.). Oxford University Press. ISBN 978-0-19-967733-7.
- Hess, Karen (1981). Martha Washington's Booke of Cookery. New York and Guildford, Surrey: Columbia University Press. ISBN 0-231-04930-7.
- Mason, Laura (1998). Sugar-plums and Sherbet: The Prehistory of Sweets. Totnes, Devon: Prospect Books. ISBN 978-0-907-32583-3.
- Richardson, Tim (2002). Sweets: A History of Candy. New York: Bloomsbury. ISBN 1-58234-229-6.
- Wilson, C Anne (1976) [1973]. Food & Drink in Britain: From the Stone Age to Recent Times. Harmondsworth, London: Penguin. ISBN 0-14-055-101-8.
