= Jumble (cookie) =

European and American baked good

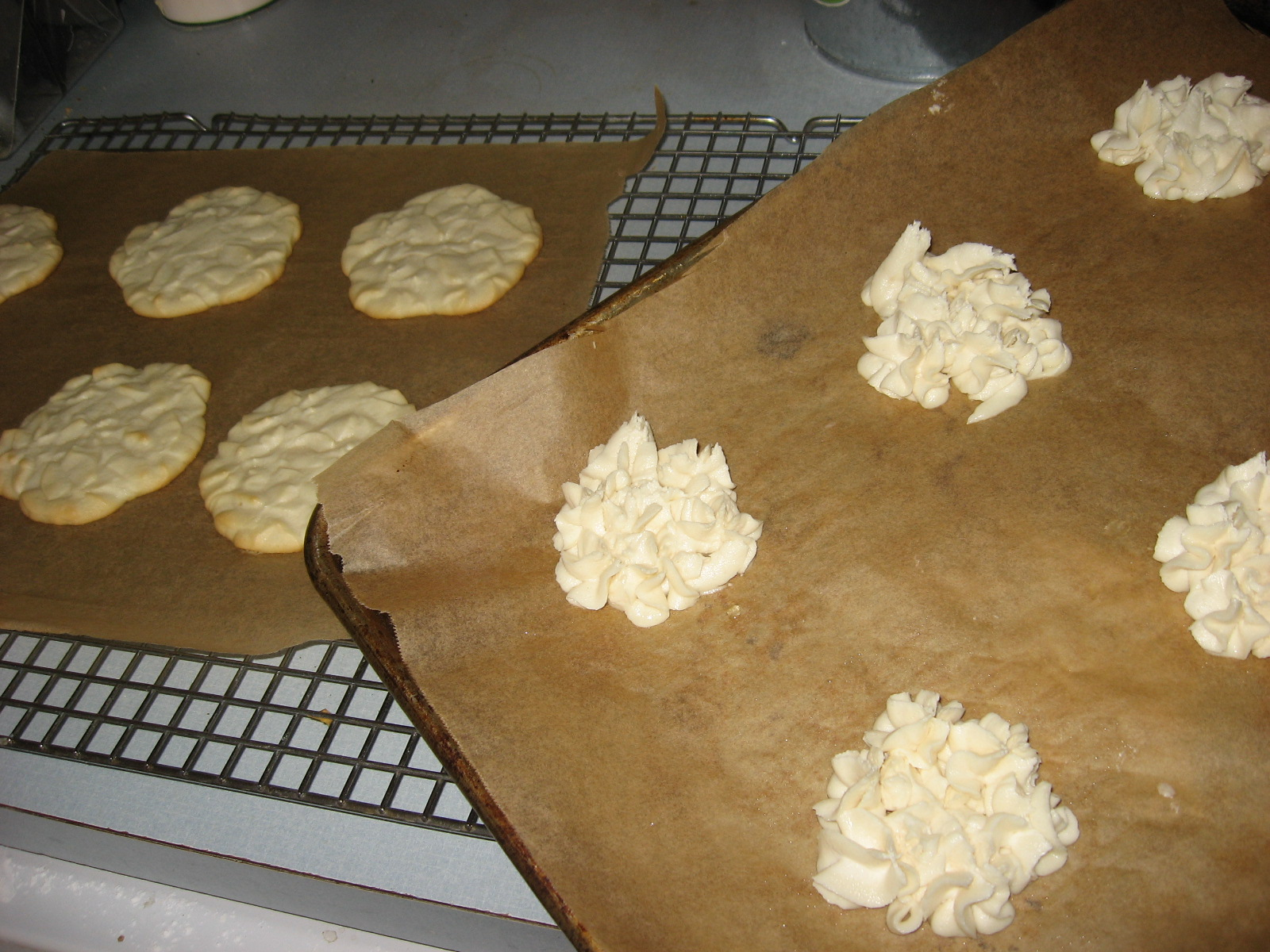
- American jumbles, made from buttermilk
- Type: Cake, cookie
- Main ingredients: Flour, eggs, sugar, butter

Jumbles are baked goods that across the early modern period were eaten as cakes and cookies in the United States and Europe.

Originating in Europe, early jumbles varied in form between shortcakes and biscuit bread. In different preparations these were shaped into interlocking rings, letters, and knots, and were flavored with cinnamon, almond, rose water, and lemon juice, among others. They were known under various names, including jumballs, jumbolds, and jombils. By the 18th century, jumbles were being eaten in America where they took on the spelling jumbles and evolved into a crispy butter cookie. These were often flavored with what the cook had at hand, including almonds, spices, chocolate, and lemon zest. These served as the precursor of the modern cookie.

Jumbles became more rare in America toward the end of the 19th century as other cookies became popular. The same decline of the jumble was described in the UK by the early 20th century, and by the 1990s jumbles were described as "almost extinct". As of 2020, the American jumble is made by some food history enthusiasts, who sometimes adapted recipes for the modern kitchen.

== In Europe ==
=== Early ===
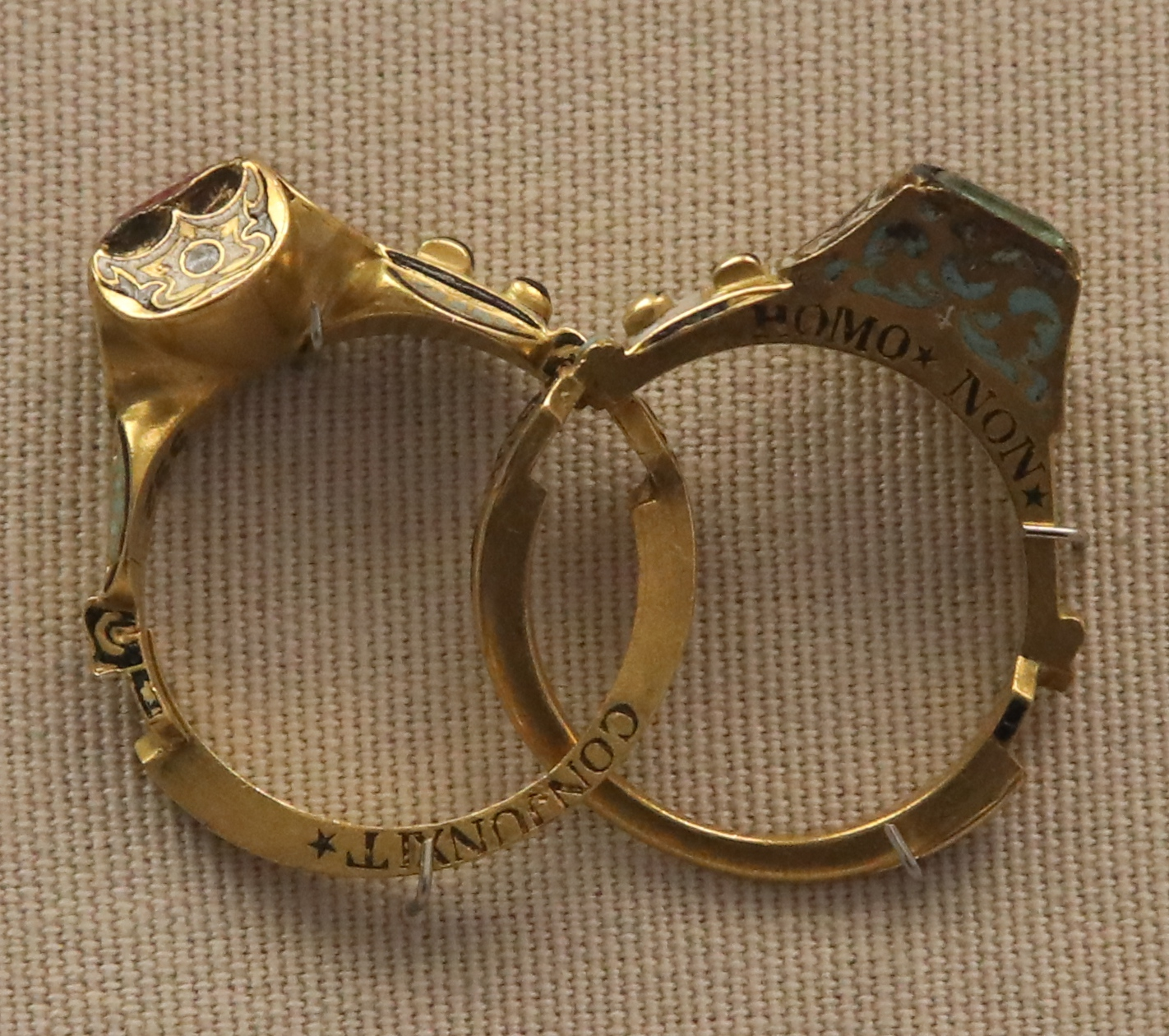
A gimmal ring, from which jumbles derive their name

Jumbles were created in Europe during the Middle Ages, though how, where, and when are, in the words of historian Christopher Hendricks, "unclear and speculative". Early jumbles were baked goods fashioned into rings and knots, sometimes boiled like modern pretzels. Their name was derived from the French gemmel, meaning "twin", referencing their resemblance to gimmal rings, a medieval jewellery made up of interlocking hoops.

The predecessor of the jumble may have originated in Middle Eastern cookery. In the region, cooks were close to where sugar and spices were being traded meaning they could afford to make sweetened, heavily spiced cakes that would have been prohibitively expensive in much of Europe. As they travelled, they stored these cakes long term, sometimes up to a year. These were introduced to Spain by the Moors, and they proceeded to spread across Europe. Hendricks writes that this is where the first jumbles originate, as these sugary, spiced cakes were developed into the biscuit. In Italy, cooks studded their jumbles with almonds and other nuts, producing the ancestor of the modern ciambelline. In France, the ancestor of the biscuit gimblette was developed, and the jumble likely departed to Britain.

According to a legendary account, jumbles were being eaten in Britain by the time of Richard III of England. After the Battle of Bosworth Field ended in Richard's death, cookbooks containing recipes for jumbles were discovered among the spoils and disseminated. Such a tale is likely the creation of bakers in mid-19th century England, invented to market their stock, as sources describing the legend have not been found preceding this date. The first textual reference to jumbles appears in 1597 in The Second Part of the Good Hus-wifes Jewell by Thomas Dawson. Dawson's recipe directs readers "To make Jombils a hundred":

"Take twenty Egges and put them into a pot both the yolkes & the white, beat them wel, then take a pound of beaten suger and put to them, and stirre them wel together, then put to it a quarter of a peck of flower, and make a hard paste thereof, and then with Anniseede moulde it well, and make it in little rowles beeing long, and tye them in knots, and wet the ends in Rosewater, then put them into a pan of séething water, but euen in one waum, then take them out with a Skimmer and lay them in a cloth to drie, this being doon lay them in a tart panne, the bottome bée∣ing oyled, then put them into a temperat Ouen for one howre, turning then often in the Ouen."

In England, jumbles were the most popular sweet of the early modern period, with consumption crossing all classes. Historian Wendy Wall describes jumbles appearing "in almost every manuscript and printed recipe collection in the [period]". At the Tudor banquet jumbles were a mainstay, flavored with cinnamon and shaped into interlocking rings, letters and knots. As the period ended with the Elizabethan era, jumbles ranged in form from shortcakes to biscuit bread, and were cooked in cooling ovens after loaves of bread had finished baking. By this time, an array of sponge biscuits had evolved from jumbles including ladyfingers, savoy biscuits, and early macaroons.

=== 17th century onwards ===
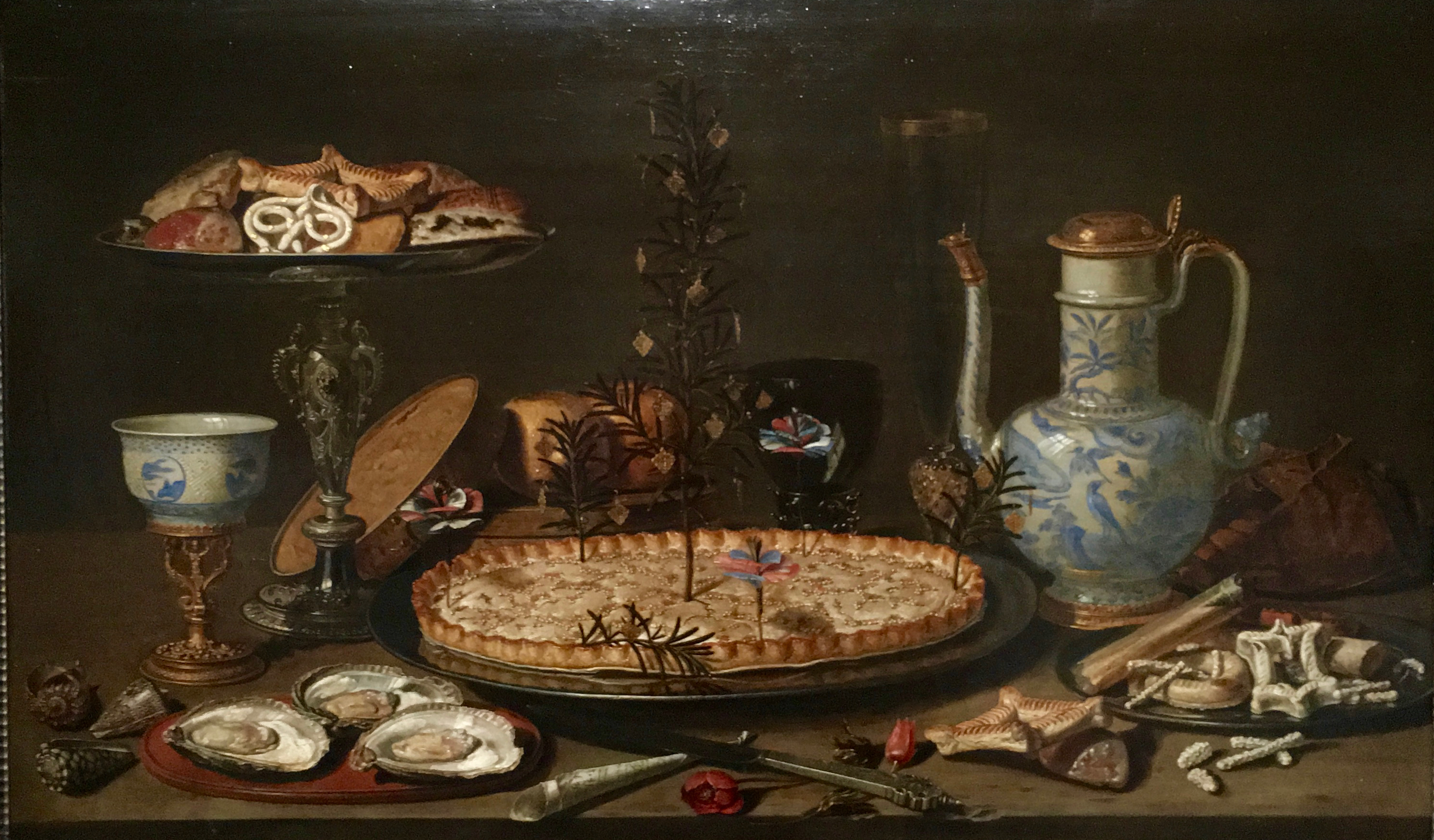
Knotted "Jumballs" (top left) in a painting by the Dutch artist Clara Peeters, circa 1615.

During the 17th century, the wealthy and aristocrats of north Germany ate jumbles at Christmas under the name "Butter-Kringeln". The high price of the constituent ingredients—the most valued sugar, eggs, butter, and wheat flour—made the jumbles inaccessible for most of the German population.

Through the 17th century in England, books included recipes for "Sugar Cakes called Jumballs". In The English Huswife (1615) by Gervase Markham, a recipe for "Iumbals" appears, producing a food described by historians Keith Stavely and Kathleen Fitzgerald as "anise-flavored small cakes". One recipe published by Anne Blencowe at the end of the century instructed in making "Almond Jumballs", pounding into a paste almond meal, sugar, simple syrup, egg whites, orange flower water or rose water, with chocolate or cochineal for color. Before cooking, these were brushed with lemon juice or rose water for flavor and very gently baked, with the caution that "it is best to sett them on something that they may not touch the bottome of the Oven." Another 17th century recipe instructed in making "Knotts or Gumballs":

Take 12 Yolkes of Egges, & 5 Whites, a pound of searced Sugar, half a pound of Butter washed in Rose Water, 3 quarters of an ounce of Mace finely beaten, a little Salt dissolved in Rose Water, half an ounce of Caroway-seeds, Mingle all theise together with as much Flower as will worke it up in paste, & soe make it Knotts or Rings or What fashion you please. Bake them as Bisket-bread, but upon Pye-plates.

— Henry Fairfax, Arcana Fairfaxiana

In the 18th century, jumbles were sold by London confectioners. In Hannah Glasse's 1747 The Art of Cookery, "jumballs" are made from sugar, flour, eggs, butter, and almonds with rosewater. After being kneaded and baked, Glasse told cooks to cut jumbles "in what figures you fancy... If you make them in pretty figures, they make a fine little dish." These jumbles were kept on the table as a side dish throughout the meal, served alongside savory plates such as stews of oyster and mutton. Recipes continued to appear in the 19th century in English cookbooks.

== In America ==
=== Arrival ===
By the 18th century, immigrants had brought jumbles to America. Compared to their homelands, immigrants had access to greater material wealth in America, and jumbles became eaten by more of the population for more of the year. The jumbles they made were shaped into knots, bows, and most often rings, which were the easiest variety for cooks to make at home. The shape was the defining aspect, with baked goods under the name jumble not having any implication of the ingredients used. It was in America that the name 'jumbal' became jumble, as the identical pronunciations of jumbal (the biscuit) and jumble (meaning mixture) caused confusion.

Recipes for jumbles appeared among the earliest American cookbooks. In Amelia Simmons's 1796 text American Cookery, a recipe for jumbles flavored with mace and rosewater was published under the name "butter drop". In 1824, twenty-eight years after American Cookery a recipe instructing "to make Jumbals" was published in Mary Randolph's The Virginia House-Wife. Randolph's recipes described: "To one pound of butter and one of flour, add one pound of sugar, four eggs beaten light, and whatever spice you like; knead all well together, and bake it nicely." Even earlier than the recipes of Simmons and Randolph, a recipe for jumbles thinned with milk and flavored with crushed caraway seeds was included in The Compleat Housewife, first published in London in 1727 and from the 1740s in the Thirteen Colonies.

=== 19th century ===
Over the 19th century, jumbles became increasingly sweet as sugar became cheaper and more accessible. Some recipes, such as one published in 1825 in Hudson Valley, New York State, called for sugar to be sprinkled on top of the cookie before baking ended, producing a white, translucent surface. At Christmas, bakers gave their jumbles color (often a red one) by sprinkling on top a colored sugar, and sometimes added flavor with caraway seeds. Crispy jumbles were popularly served with warm drinks (coffee, cider, tea, etc.) in which they were dunked. The ring shape of some jumbles in this period may have inspired the shape of doughnuts in America. (Note: An alternative proposal gives crullers as the inspiration, which were often formed into a twisted ring.)

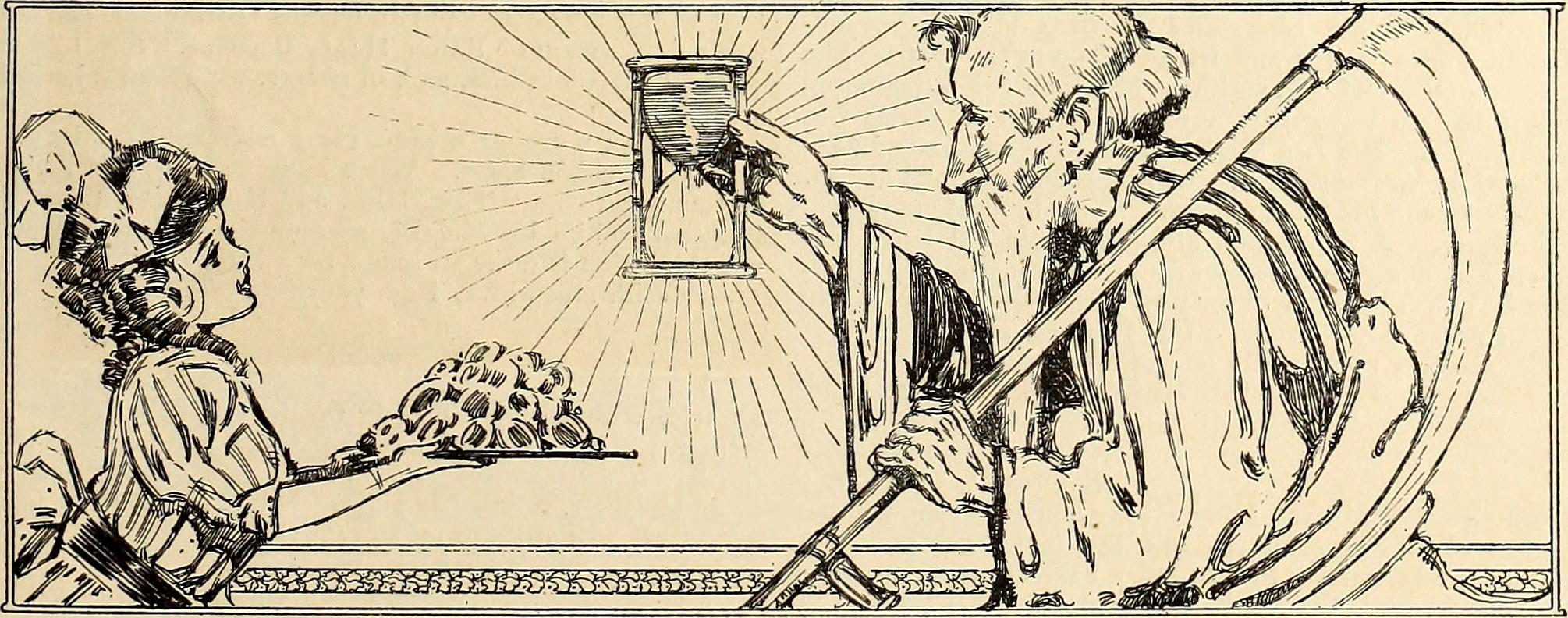
Early 20th-century illustration of a young girl with a plate of jumbles

As a relatively small amount of flour came to make up jumbles, their shape became more and more flat, until some varieties were being known under the names "Paper Jumble" and "Wafer Jumble". By the later 19th century, jumble dough had become substantially softer, and some recipes called for the cook to firm up the dough on ice for several hours before shaping. Shaping now was done with tin, mass-produced jumble cutters that were also used for shaping doughnuts. Historian William Woys Weaver describes this softening as the result of how little flour jumbles now contained. Food writer Stella Parks describes "soft jumbles" produced intentionally, as cooks thinned stiff doughs with milk and eggs to avoid the arduous process of rolling an inelastic dough. The now softened dough could be dropped straight from a spoon onto a baking tray, becoming flat and crisp as they baked.

Jumbles in the later 19th century remained associated with Christmas, appearing in illustrations being carried by Santa Claus and decorating Christmas trees. They were flavored according to what was convenient to the cook, including lemon zest, spices, coconut, or almonds, as well as chocolate, grated on a rasp. This element of lemon was the distinguishing element in Englishwoman Isabella Beeton's recipe for "California Jumbles", published in her 1861 book Mrs. Beeton's Book of Household Management. In the 1880s and 1890s, chocolate jumbles were a popular recipe in American newspapers and cookbooks. During the American Civil War, cooks in the South named some of their jumbles after their heroes, such as the Jackson jumble for Stonewall Jackson, and the Davis Jumble for Jefferson Davis.

== Decline ==
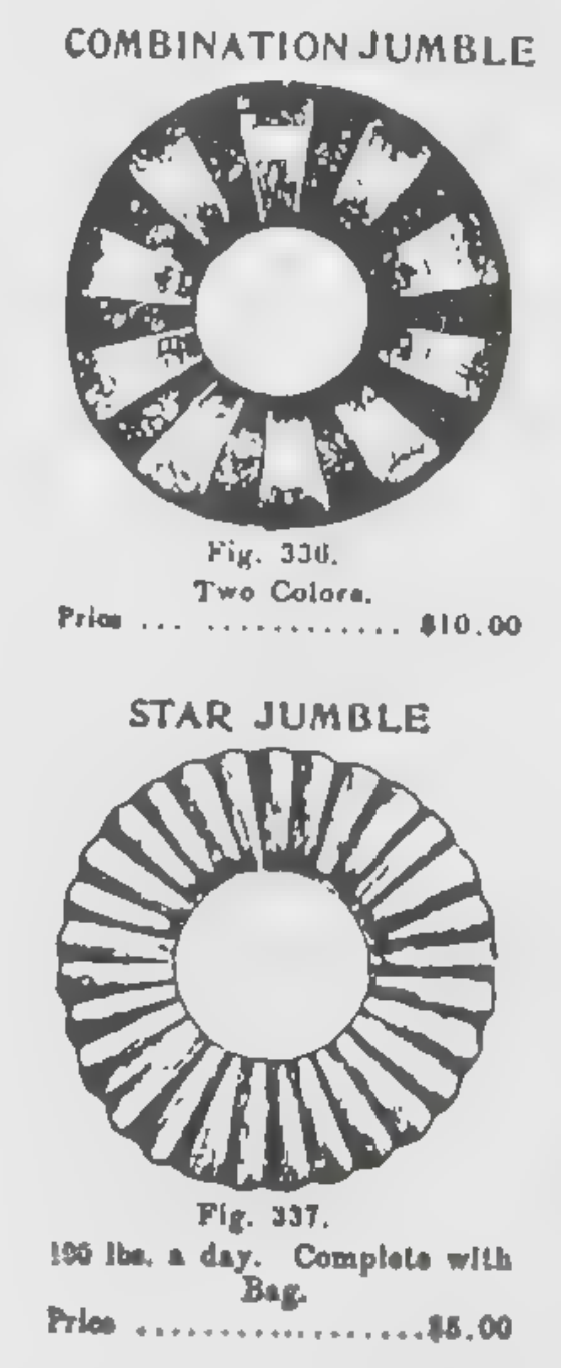
Varieties of American jumbles, 1908

Jumbles declined in popularity in America during the late 19th century as sand tarts, a richer and sweeter cookie, became more widely consumed. Recipes continued to appear, still popular enough by 1931 to make it into the first edition of Joy of Cooking. In 1923, the decline of jumbles was described in England by author G. K. Chesterton, as he described "a brown flexible cake now almost gone from us". Chesterton's was one of many varying descriptions that jumbles had been given over their history, with some listed by Stavely and Fitzgerald including "soft butter cookie, a sugar cake, and a hard spiced biscuit, flavored with anise, lemon, or almonds."

By the 1990s, jumbles were still being produced by the American grocery chain A&P, although Weaver described the jumble as "almost extinct". In the 2010s, jumbles experienced a resurgence in popularity via the internet, where bloggers reproduced different jumble recipes, often framing their efforts as an attempt to preserve American culinary heritage. These preservation efforts fell along a spectrum, from those who closely followed historic recipes with the intent of recreating an original jumble, and those who modified ratios and added ingredients such as dried cranberries to suit modern kitchens and palates.

== Names ==
Jumbles have been known under various names and spellings. Among these include:

- Jombil in The Second Part of the Good Huswifes Jewell (1597) – Thomas Dawson
- Iumbal in The English Huswife (1615) – Gervase Markham
- Jumbold in The Queen-Like Closet (1670) – Hannah Woolley
- Jemello and jamball in The Accomplisht Cook (1671) – Robert May
- Jumball in The Art of Cookery Made Plain and Easy (1747) – Hannah Glasse

At other times, jumbles have been known under the names and spellings of jamble, jumboll, jemelloe, and gemmel.

== Sources ==
- Arendt, Emily J (2020). "All jumbled up: authenticity in American culinary history". Food and Foodways. 28 (3). doi:10.1080/07409710.2020.1783810.
- Brears, Peter (1985). Food and Cooking in 17th Century Britain: History and Recipes. English Heritage. ISBN 1-85074-083-6.
- Colquhoun, Kate (2007). Taste: the Story of Britain Through its Cooking. New York: Bloomsbury. ISBN 978-1-5969-1410-0.
- Ehrman, Edwina; Forsyth, Hazel; Peltz, Lucy; Ross, Cathy (1999). London Eats Out: 500 Years of Capital Dining. London: Philip Wilson Publishers. ISBN 0-904818-93-4.
- Hendricks, Christopher E (2023). "The Jumbal: Cookies, Society, and International Trade". Studies in Eighteenth-Century Culture. 52. doi:10.1353/sec.2023.0029.
- Krondl, Michael (2015). "Dougnuts". In Goldstein, Darra (ed.). The Oxford Companion to Sugar and Sweets. Oxford: Oxford University Press. ISBN 978-0-199-31339-6.
- Mason, Laura (2014). "Jumbles". In Davidson, Alan; Jaine, Tom (eds.). The Oxford Companion to Food (3rd ed.). Oxford University Press. ISBN 978-0-19-967733-7.
- Mintz, Sidney (1985). Sweetness and Power: The Place of Sugar in Modern History. New York: Penguin Books. pp. 93. ISBN 0-670-68702-2.
- Parks, Stella (2017). BraveTart: Iconic American Desserts. New York & London: W.W. Norton & Company. ISBN 978-0-393-23986-7.
- Sax, Richard (1999). Classic Home Desserts: A Treasury of Heirloom and Contemporary Recipes from Around the World. Boston, Massachusetts: Houghton Mifflin Harcourt. ISBN 978-0-618-00391-4.
- Stavely, Keith; Fitzgerald, Kathleen (2011). Northern Hospitality: Cooking by the Book in New England. Amherst & Boston: University of Massachusetts Press. ISBN 978-1-55849-861-7.
- Stead, Jennifer (1995). "Introduction". "First Catch Your Hare ... ": The Art of Cookery Made Plain and Easy. Blackawton, Devon: Prospect Books. ISBN 978-1-903018-37-8.
- Veit, Helen Zoe (2015). Food in the Civil War Era: The South. American Food in History. East Lansing: Michigan State University Press. ISBN 978-1-61186-164-8.
- Wall, Wendy (2016). Recipes for Thought: Knowledge and Taste in the Early Modern English Kitchen. Philadelphia, Pennsylvania: University of Pennsylvania Press. ISBN 978-0-8122-4758-9.
- Weaver, William Woys (1990). The Christmas Cook: Three Centuries of American Yuletide Sweets. New York: HarperPerennial. ISBN 0-06-055212-3.
- Wilson, C Anne (2003) [1973]. Food and Drink in Britain: From the Stone Age to Recent Times. Chicago, Illinois: Academy Chicago Publishers. ISBN 0-89733-364-0.
