= Election cake =

Type of New England cake

Election cake, sometimes shortened to 'Lection cake, was a great cake served in New England at various events, particularly around the election of officials. By the 1800s, election cakes were made in a range of preparations, typically as a sweetened yeast cake.

== History ==
Election cakes originated with Election Day, an event held in spring on a Wednesday wherein members of the Massachusetts Bay Company met to elect officers. Over time, the day evolved into a Puritan festival, and by 1631 the event was marked by sermons and the consumption of election cake with election beer. (Note: Hackett Fischer gives the month as April; Stavely and Fitzgerald May.) In the Puritan tradition of the day, the name "elect" also had connotations of suffrage being restricted to the theologically "elect".

A sweet named "Election Cake" was included by Amelia Simmons in 1796 in her second edition of American Cookery. The cake was one of several with politically charged names, alongside "Independence Cake" and "Federal Pan Cake". In the following decades, recipes for Election Cake and other dishes with patriotic titles appeared throughout newspapers in the US. Consumption continued into the 19th century. In the childhood reflections of the botanist John Howard Redfield, who was raised in Connecticut in the early 19th century, election cake is recalled as a rich loaf, made for Election week (an alternative to Election Day in some areas) but also for high teas and weddings. The decadence of these preparations varied: simpler cakes were made for Election week, and a richer version for weddings, decorated ornately with frosting. The cakes themselves contained eggs and flour, spices and raisins.

Mentions of election cakes associating them with ideals of abundance and communal festivities persisted throughout the 19th century in cookbooks and published reminiscences, and later in literature catering to New England nostalgia. One such cake was included in Lydia Maria Child's 1829 book The American Frugal Housewife:

Old fashioned election cake is made of four pounds of flour; three quarters of a pound of butter; four eggs; one pound of sugar; one pound of currants, or raisins if you choose; half a pint of good yeast; wet it with milk as soft as it can be and be moulded on a board. Set to rise over night in winter; in warm weather, three hours is usually enough for it to rise. A loaf, the size of a common flour bread, should bake three quarters of an hour. (Note: In metric, this is: 1.8 kilograms of flour; 0.35 kilograms of butter; four eggs; 0.45 kilograms of sugar; 0.45 kilograms of currants, or raisins if you choose; 250 milliliters of good yeast)

Esther Allen Howland reproduced this recipe, without the raisins, in her 1845 New England Economical Housekeeper. (Note: Stavely and Fitzgerald label this omission "inexplicable".) Over the course of the 19th century, cakes leavened with yeast fell from popularity in America as the use of chemical leaveners became increasingly common. Over the preceding centuries, election cakes had been known under a range of names, including "Connecticut loaf cake", "March Meeting Cake", and "Dough Cake".

== Sources ==
- Child, Lydia Maria (1829). The Frugal Housewife: Dedicated to Those Who Are Not Ashamed of Economy. Boston: Marsh & Capen; Carter & Hendee.
- Hackett Fischer, David (1989). Albion's Seed: Four British Folkways in America. New York: Oxford University Press. ISBN 0-19-503794-4.
- McWilliams, James E. (2005). A Revolution in Eating: How the Quest for Food Shaped America. Art and Traditions of the Table. New York: Columbia University Press. ISBN 0-231-12992-0.
- Oliver, Sandra L (1995). Saltwater Foodways. Mystic, Connecticut: Mystic Seaport Museum. ISBN 0-913372-72-2.
- Stavely, Keith; Fitzgerald, Kathleen (2004). America's Founding Food: The Story of New England Cooking. Chapel Hill, North Carolina & London: The University of North Carolina Press. ISBN 0-8078-2894-7.
- Vester, Katharina (2015). A Taste of Power: Food and American Identities. Oakland, California: University of California Press. ISBN 978-0-520-28497-5.
