= Spice cake =

Cake flavored with spices

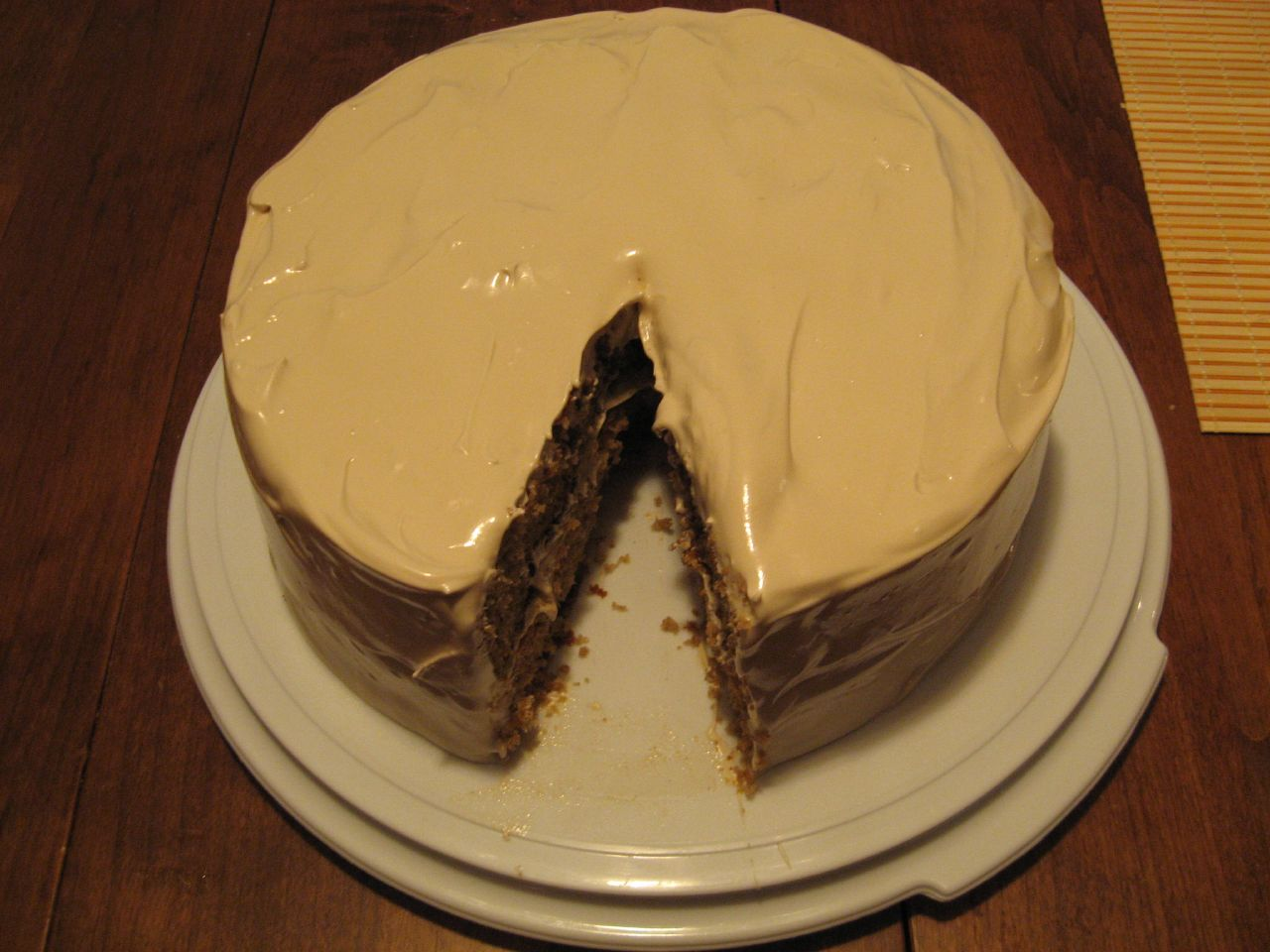
- Spice cake with seafoam frosting
- Type: Cake
- Main ingredients: Cake base, spices
- Variations: Maple spice cake

Spice cake is a type of cake that is traditionally flavored with a mixture of spices. The cake can be prepared in many varieties. Predominant flavorings include spices such as cinnamon, cloves, allspice, ginger, and nutmeg.

== Description ==
In Medieval cuisine, a spice cake, also called spice bread, was a flavorful, sweetened yeast bread. It was typically sweetened with honey, as sugar was largely unavailable in Europe until the 1600s, and cooked over an open fire. By the 17th century, spice cake was something similar to the modern raisin bread, usually having spices, sugar, dried fruit, eggs, and butter in the yeast dough. The sizes ranged from individual buns to ordinary loaves to the great cake, which was a very large cake, sometimes weighing more than 50 pounds (25 kg) that was baked for holidays and important celebrations. (Because these cakes often included both dried fruit and spices, most of them can also be classified as fruit cakes.)

With the development of the sugar trade, spice cakes were still popular, and were coated in white icing on special occasions. French chefs hired by Charles II of England in the mid-1600s baked elaborate spice cakes coated in white icing. This decoration style became popular for wedding cakes, and having a white coating over a darker cake was the first meaning of a white cake.

The modern spice cake, a type of butter cake or layer cake, appeared in the latter part of the 19th century. Brown sugar, molasses, and a generous quantity of dark-colored spices were used to produce a dark brown cake. By the middle of the 20th century, various kinds of spice cake were the second most popular cake flavors in the US.

== Variations ==
A maple spice cake is an American variation that adds maple syrup or maple flavoring. The recipe was a New Hampshire specialty that started at the beginning of the 19th century. It often tastes like cinnamon or apple cider, and is a fall classic.

Sometimes, spice cake is combined with layers of lighter colored cakes, to produce a multi-flavored, multi-colored cake. Names for this included ribbon cake, metropolitan cake, Neapolitan cake, Prince of Wales cake, and Harlequin cake.

During times of food rationing or to keep costs down, spice cakes lent themselves toward replacing expensive ingredients, such as eggs and butter, with more economical choices, such as pureed fruit.

Marble cake is sometimes made with spice cake for the darker colored batter.

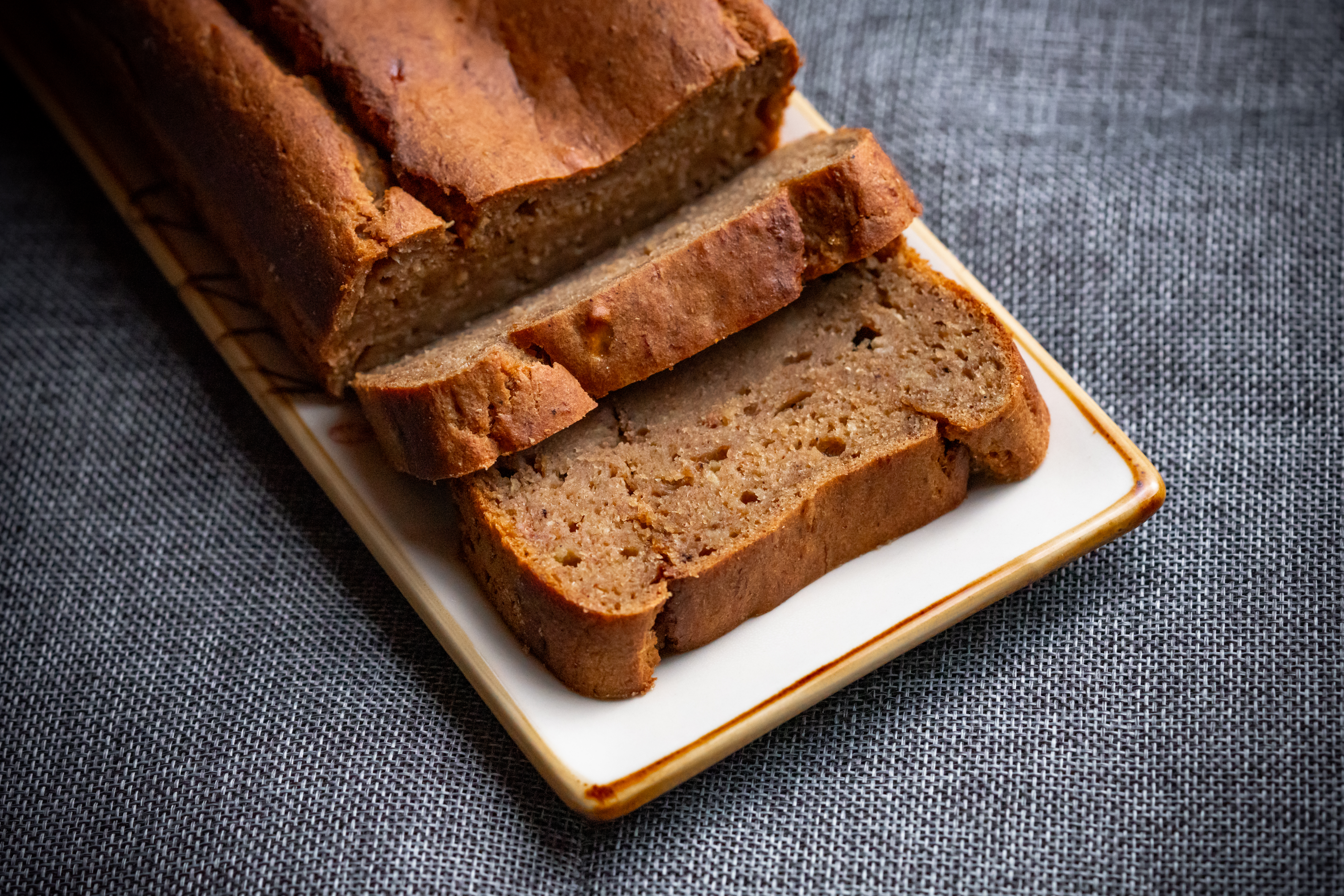
Spice cake with bananas

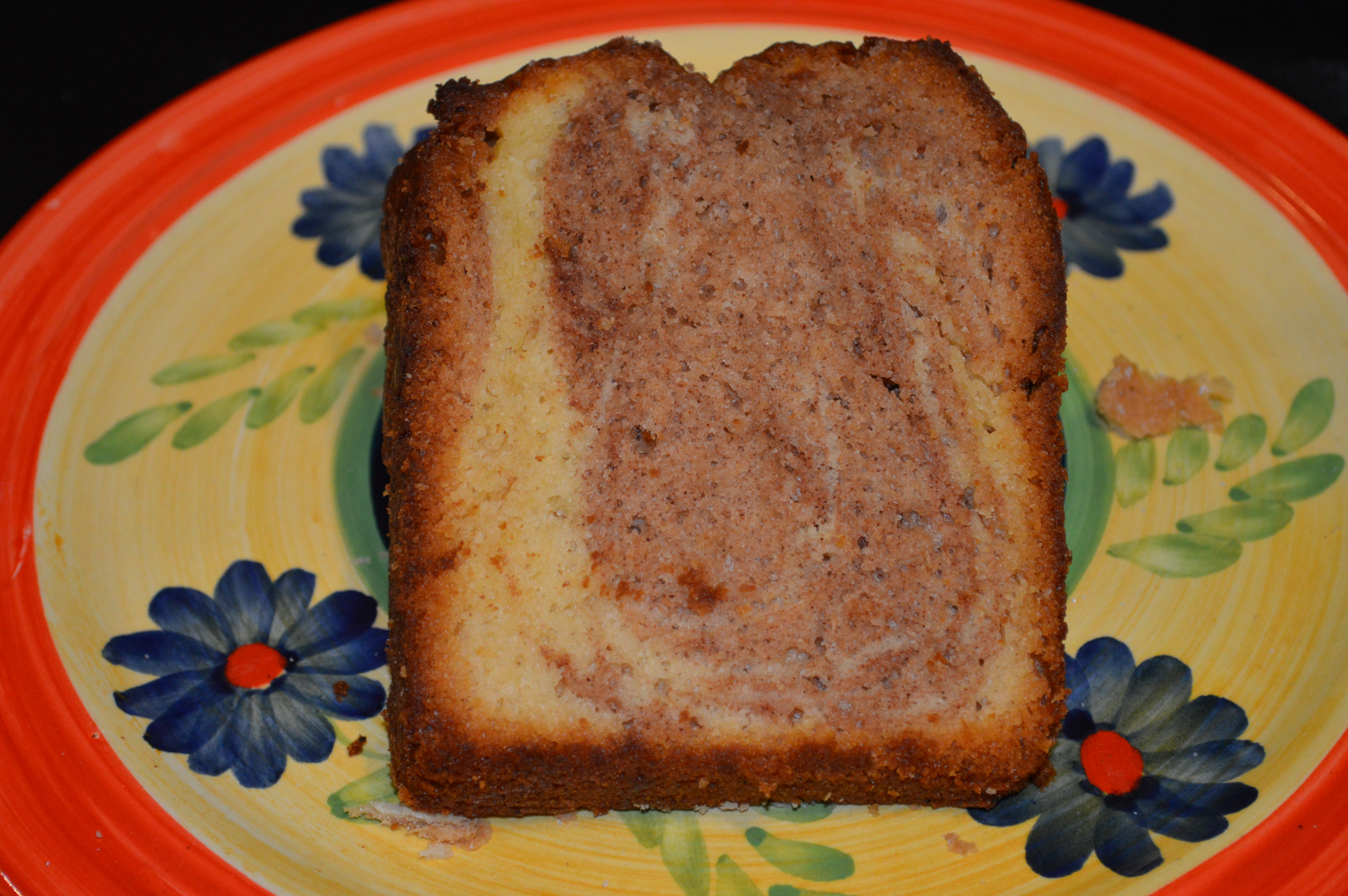
Marbled spice cake

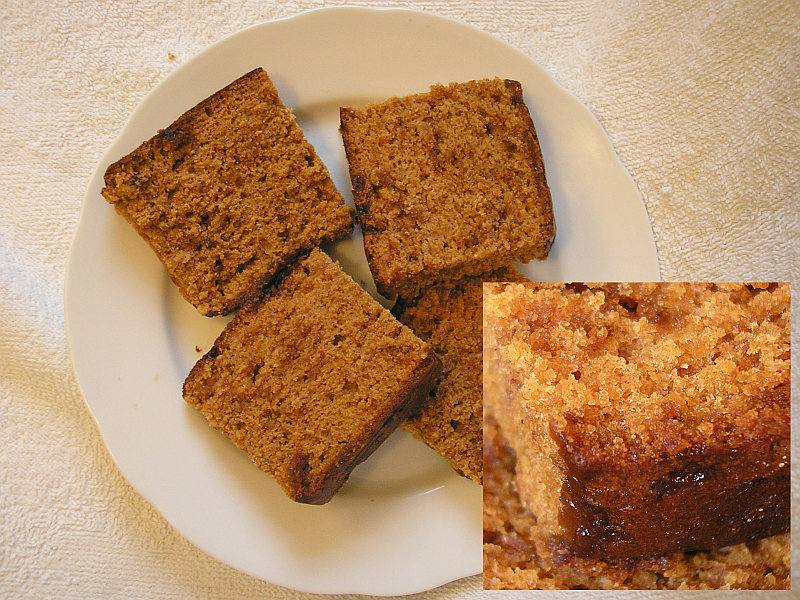
Kruidkoek

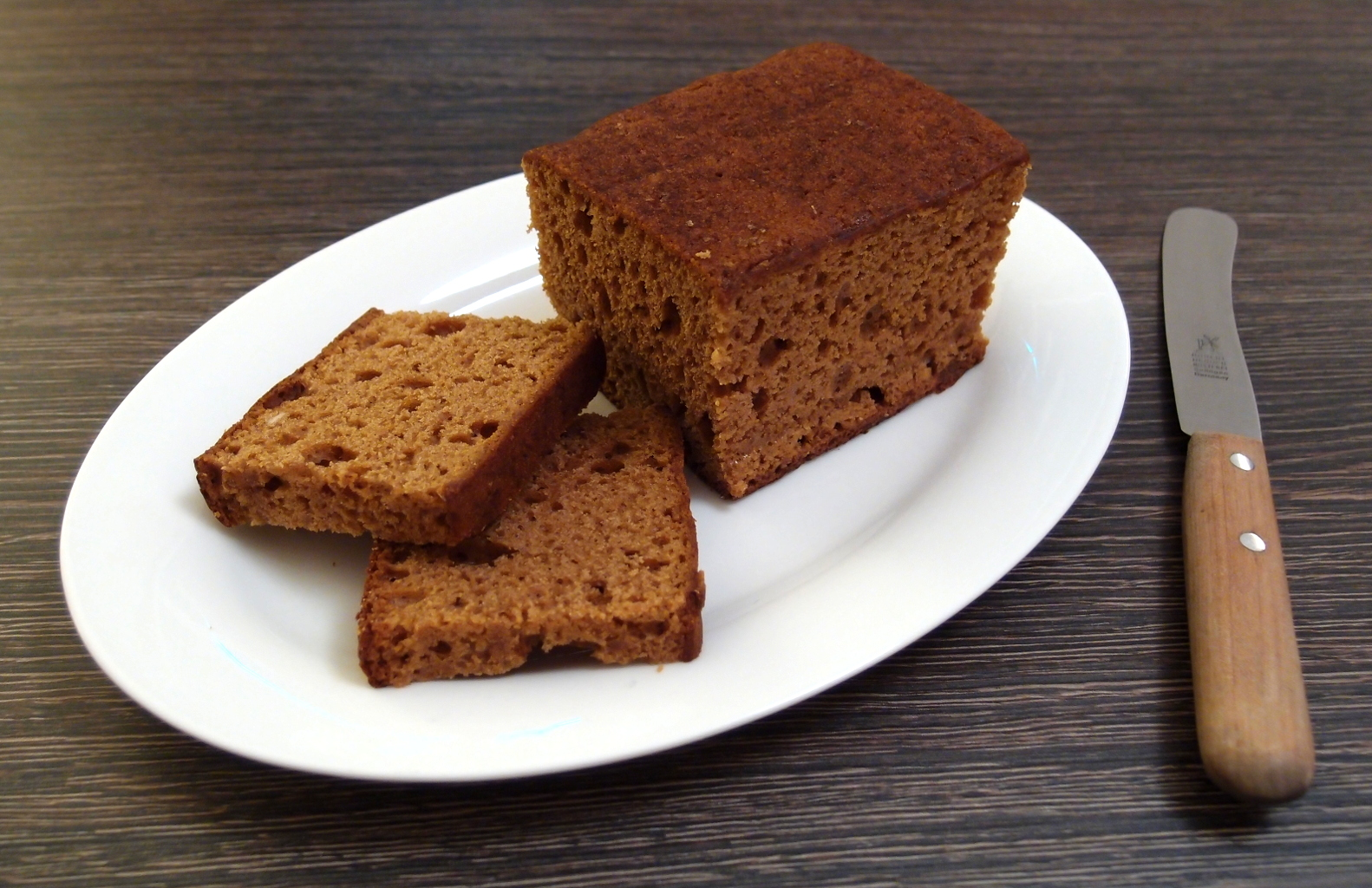
Gingerbread

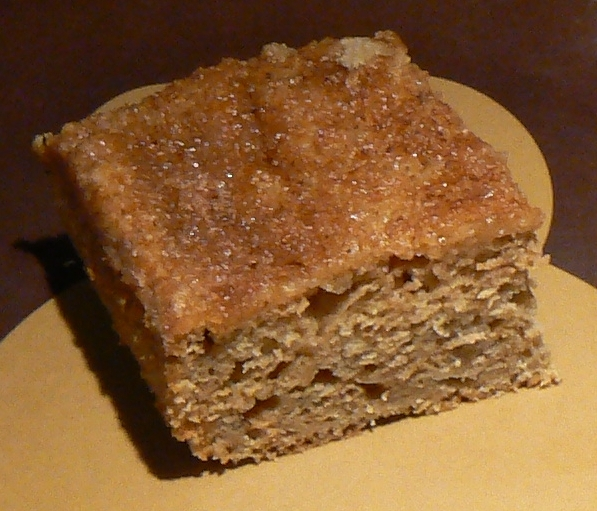
Applesauce cake

== Notable versions ==
- Applesauce cake
- Banbury cake
- Carrot cake
- Election cake
- Gingerbread
- Gâteau de Sirop
- Kruidkoek
- Parkin
- Pork cake
- Singing hinny
- Spekkoek

== See also ==
- List of cakes
