= Confectionery in the English Renaissance =

Culinary history

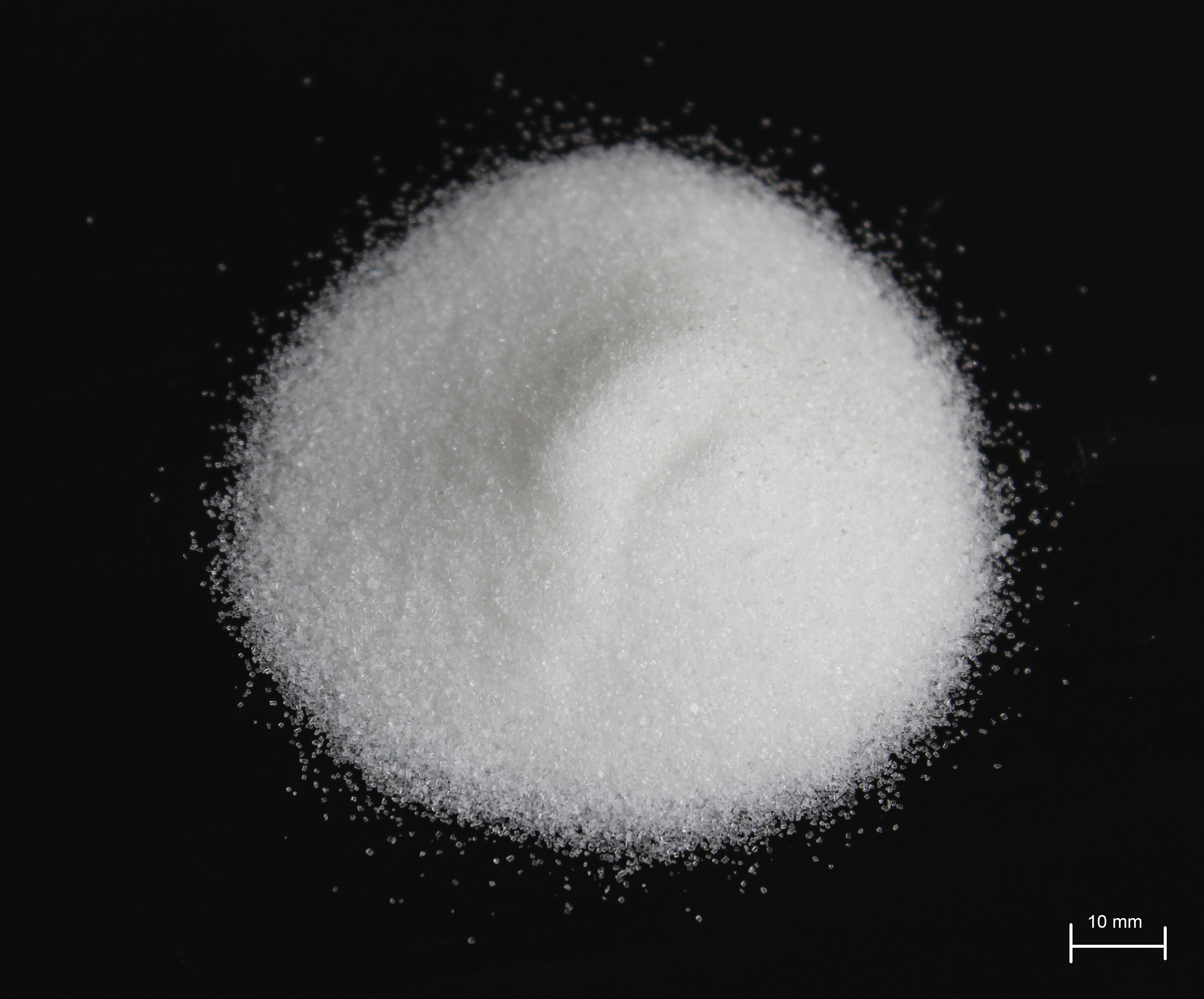
Refined sugar is extracted from sugarcane and processed at length to remove impurities.

Confections of the English Renaissance span a wide range of products. All were heavily based on sugar, which was a relatively new development. Many were considered to have medicinal properties – a belief that was influenced by the Arabic use of sugar as a medicine and that carried over from medieval sugar usage. In the mid-sixteenth century, sugar became cheaper and more widely available to the general populace due to European colonization of the New World. It began to be used more as a flavouring, preservative, and sweetener, as it is today, rather than as medicine.

== Origins ==
Before the Renaissance era, confections typically consisted of exotic imports from the Mediterranean and the Middle East such as almonds, citrus fruits, rosewater, spices, and sometimes, sugar. The exclusivity and high cost of ingredients made confectionery a respected trade. While sugarcane had been known in Europe since Roman times, it had previously been dismissed in favor of honey as a sweetener. It became more widely used after Arabs and Persians developed the process that produces refined sugar.

Italian traders were instrumental in the trade of sugar and other confections from the Middle East to Europe, especially in the Middle Ages. Venice was a particularly important trading hub, very dominant in the diffusion of Arabic sugar skills and medicine. Sugar became more common in Europe starting in the 1420s, after Portuguese colonies began to cultivate sugarcane and overtook imports from the Middle East. The price of sugar dropped significantly after New World imports began to dominate the market in the mid-sixteenth century. This allowed for the increased production of sweetmeats as desserts, and the confectioner could expand his market to people beyond the upper classes. Originally associated with medicine, sugar's role as a main ingredient in confections and preservatives became more popular in the early Renaissance. Noblewomen would engage in confectionery as a hobby, which partly gave rise to the tradition of banquets in England.

== Colonialism ==
Renaissance confectionery was heavily reliant on sugar. Colonization in the New World did not significantly affect the sugar trade until the mid-sixteenth century. Spanish colonies in the Canaries and Portuguese colonies in the Azores, Madeira, and São Tomé were the first to use slaves to produce sugar. The West Indies soon proved to be more conducive to sugarcane production and colonizing countries sent Africans as slaves to work on sugarcane plantations there from the early sixteenth century. The Atlantic slave trade fuelled sugar production and imports into England and continued for centuries until its abolition in 1807. Voyages were deadly due to torturous conditions on ships, and plantation work was laborious and slaves would often perish from the physical stress. Planting sugarcane involved digging pits in a way that plows could not, then harvesting it and crushing it in sugar mills to produce sugar. Additionally, the crop itself was more labour-intensive that other cash crops such as cotton. The sugar slave trade is considered to be the first occurrence of mass slavery since Roman times.

== Types ==
=== Sweetmeats ===
"Sweetmeats" is a term that encompasses a wide range of confections prepared with sugar.

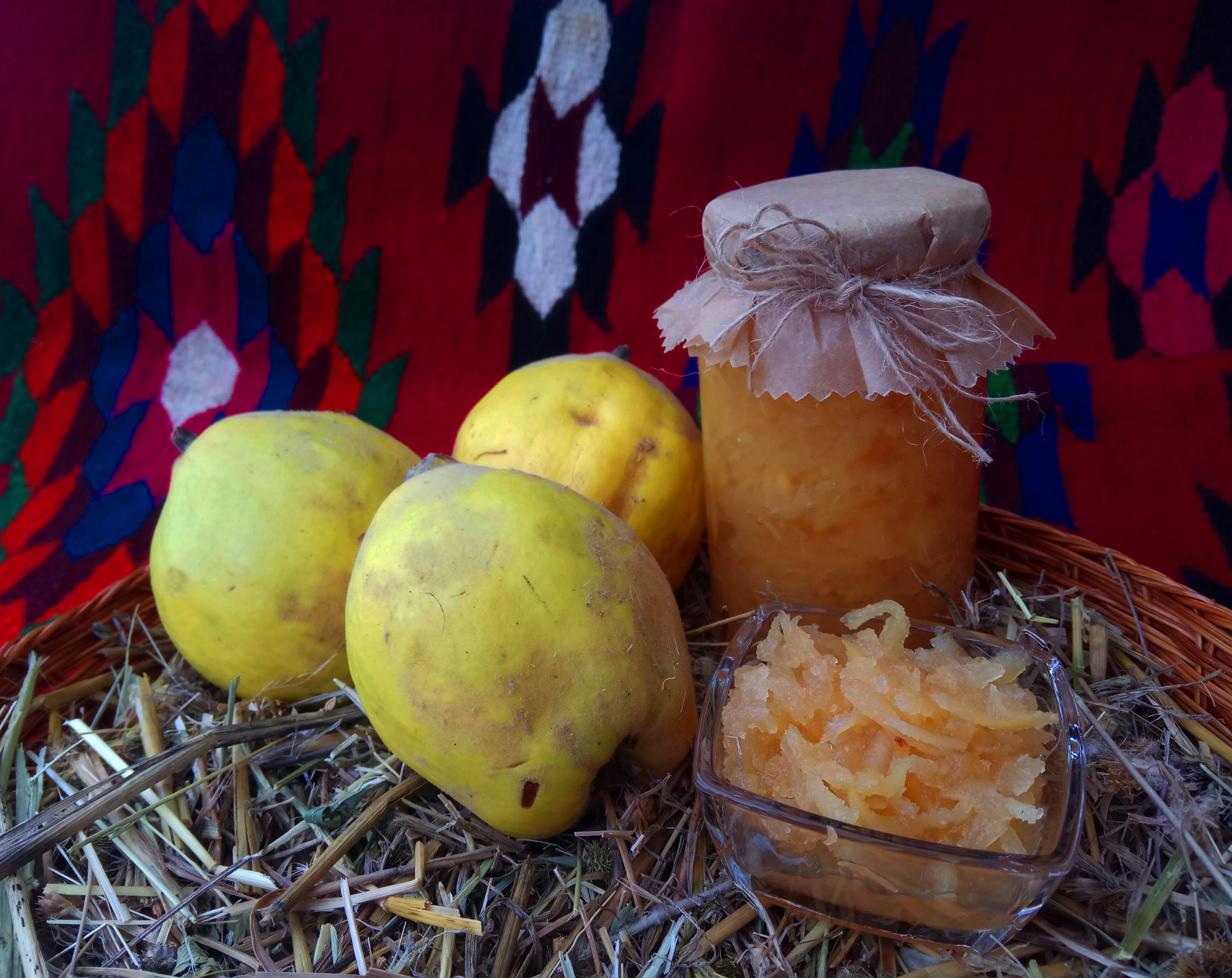
Quince fruit and jam.

Quince was a versatile and popular fruit in the Renaissance. It was used for medicinal preparations and eaten preserved, jellied, and as the main ingredient in marmalades. Marmalade in the Renaissance was a quince paste cooked in sugar, sometimes enhanced with rosewater, spices, perfumes such as musk, and fruit juices. It would be set in decorative moulds and could be served with comfits placed on top.

Syrup is a sugar-based confection made by boiling sugar and water, either served alone or with candied fruits or other flavourings. Syrups as a fruit preservative gained popularity with the lower classes once the price of sugar dropped in the late sixteenth century. Before this, upper-class women made it at home. The use of syrup as a preservative originated in Arabic countries; England was exposed to it through the import of preserved citrus fruits.

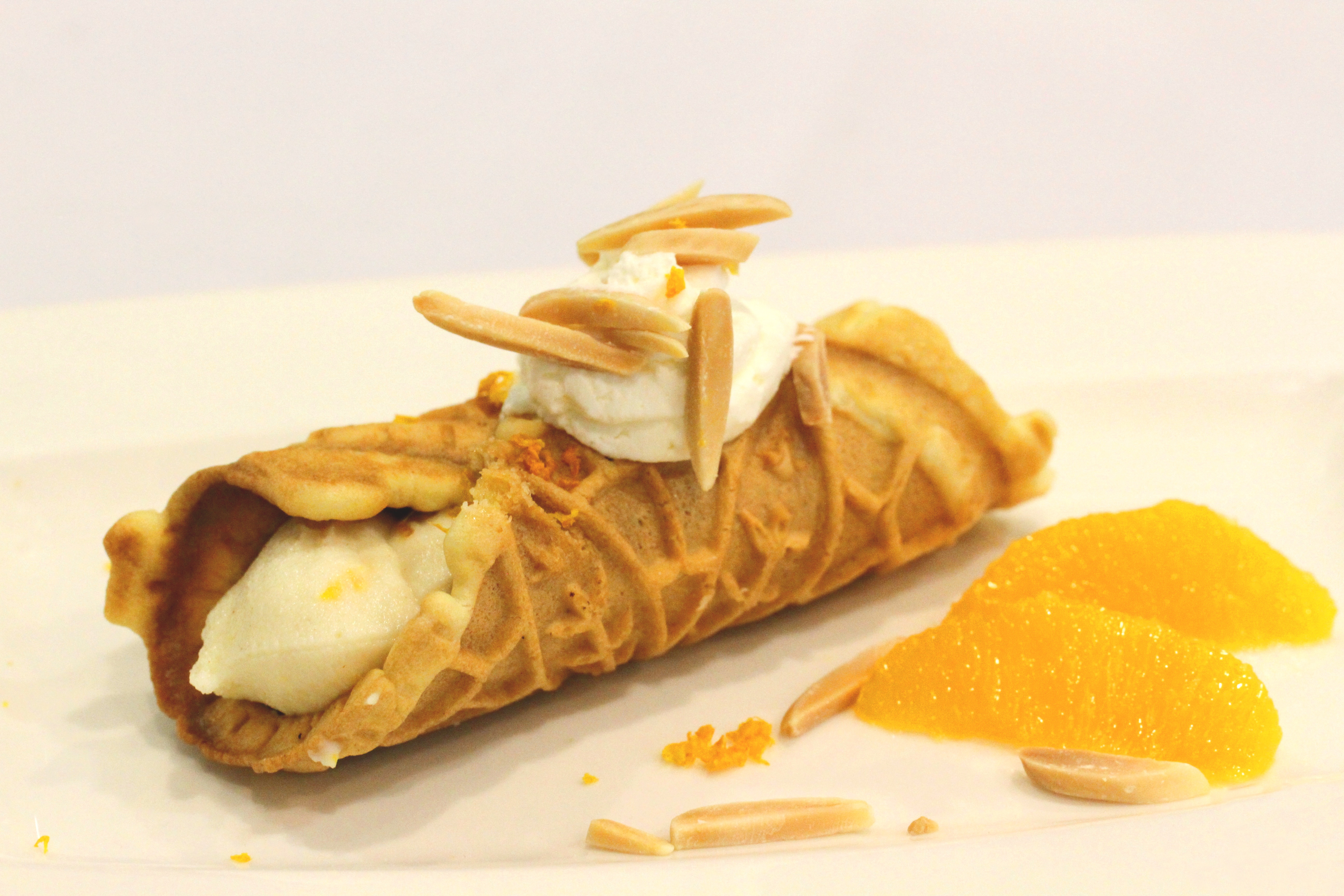
A pizzelle, an Italian pastry similar to Renaissance wafers.

Conserves were made "by pounding fresh herbs, flowers or fruits with sugar to form a thick, sticky mass." They were most often made with aromatic flowers and could be enhanced with medicinal ingredients. Some popular examples include the conserves of red roses, marigolds, violets, chicory, rosemary, lavender, barberries, apricots, and oranges.

Biscuits (cookies in the United States and Canada) were present both at court banquets and in the household. Their name means "twice-cooked", alluding to the method of baking that gives them a crispy crust. Another method of preparation was to boil the dough in a sugar syrup, resulting in a different texture. Biscuits would be made into a variety of shapes, such as letters and knots, and frequently served at court. Marzipan, made from almond paste, rosewater, and powdered sugar, was easily moulded into any form. Wafers were made by cooking batter between patterned irons and could be rolled into a cone and filled with something sweet. They could be flavoured with orange flower water or coffee.

=== Comfits ===
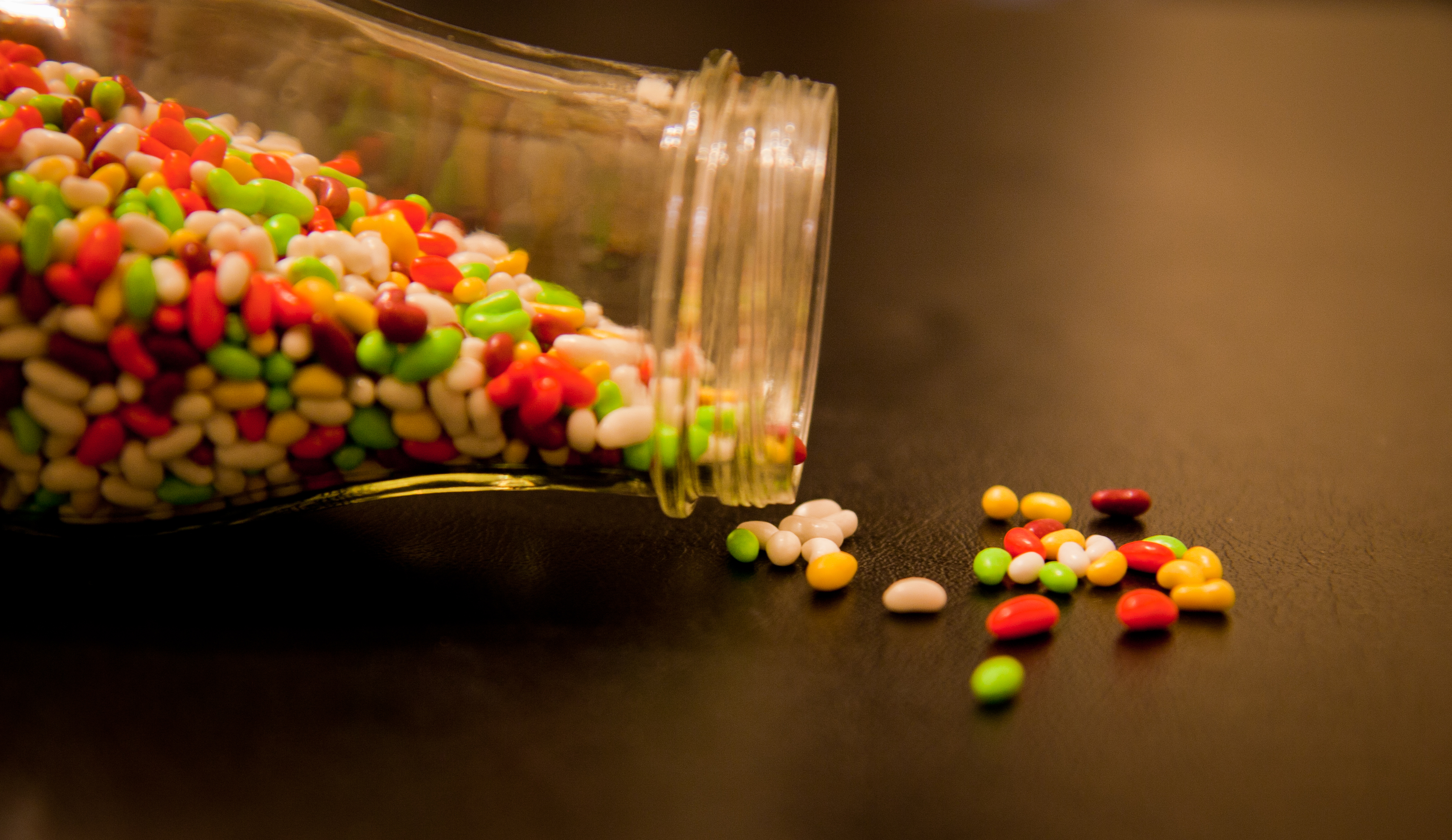
Modern, sugar-coated fennel seeds.

A comfit was a spice, seed, or nut coated with sugar. One of the first confections, it originated in the Middle East as a medicine for indigestion and reached Europe through Italian merchants. It was the main specialty of confectioners in Renaissance England and was sold in apothecaries as well. To make a comfit, confectioners used a balancing pan to lay out the food being covered and subsequently coated it with gum arabic to prevent oils from disturbing the sugar coat. Finally, multiple layers of sugar syrup were applied and the comfits were dried in the sun. The final layers usually included a colourant such as saffron, beet juice, or spinach juice. The sugar syrup itself could also be flavoured or perfumed with musk, ambergris, rosewater, or other floral distillations.

There were two main types of comfits: smooth and ragged. They differed in the density of sugar syrup that coated them, and thus had different textures. Long comfits, slivers of cinnamon and orange, were used extensively for decoration. The most popular comfits were coated caraway seeds, aniseed, fennel seeds, coriander seeds, and almonds.

== Health and medicine ==
Sugar was originally introduced to Europe as a preservative and a medicine. European apothecaries adopted many of their practices from Arabic physicians.

Renaissance medicine partly relied on diet. Dieticians recommended consuming sugar to prevent adverse effects believed to arise from other foods. Certain properties were assigned to food, and a food's nutritional value was determined by its taste and supposed effect on the body. Sugar, for example, was categorized as "hot and moist" – complementary to the human body. Ken Albala argues that this made sugar "a prime candidate for the miracle food category," being used extensively in feasts at court and praised for its medicinal value.

=== The apothecary ===
The Renaissance apothecary was a shop that sold medicines and, at times, prescribed them. Medicines would be prepared with the model of the four humours in mind. Apothecaries would often take an individualized approach, making personalized medicines. The apothecary was the main purveyor of sugar-based concoctions until the confectioner began to sell sugar as a food instead of a medicine in the later Renaissance. Some typical products were syrups, preserves of herbs and roots, floral sugars, lozenges, and comfits. Sugar would be used to preserve and flavour otherwise unpalatable medicines and to make carrier substances for medicines, such as enhanced marmalades.

=== Examples of medicines ===
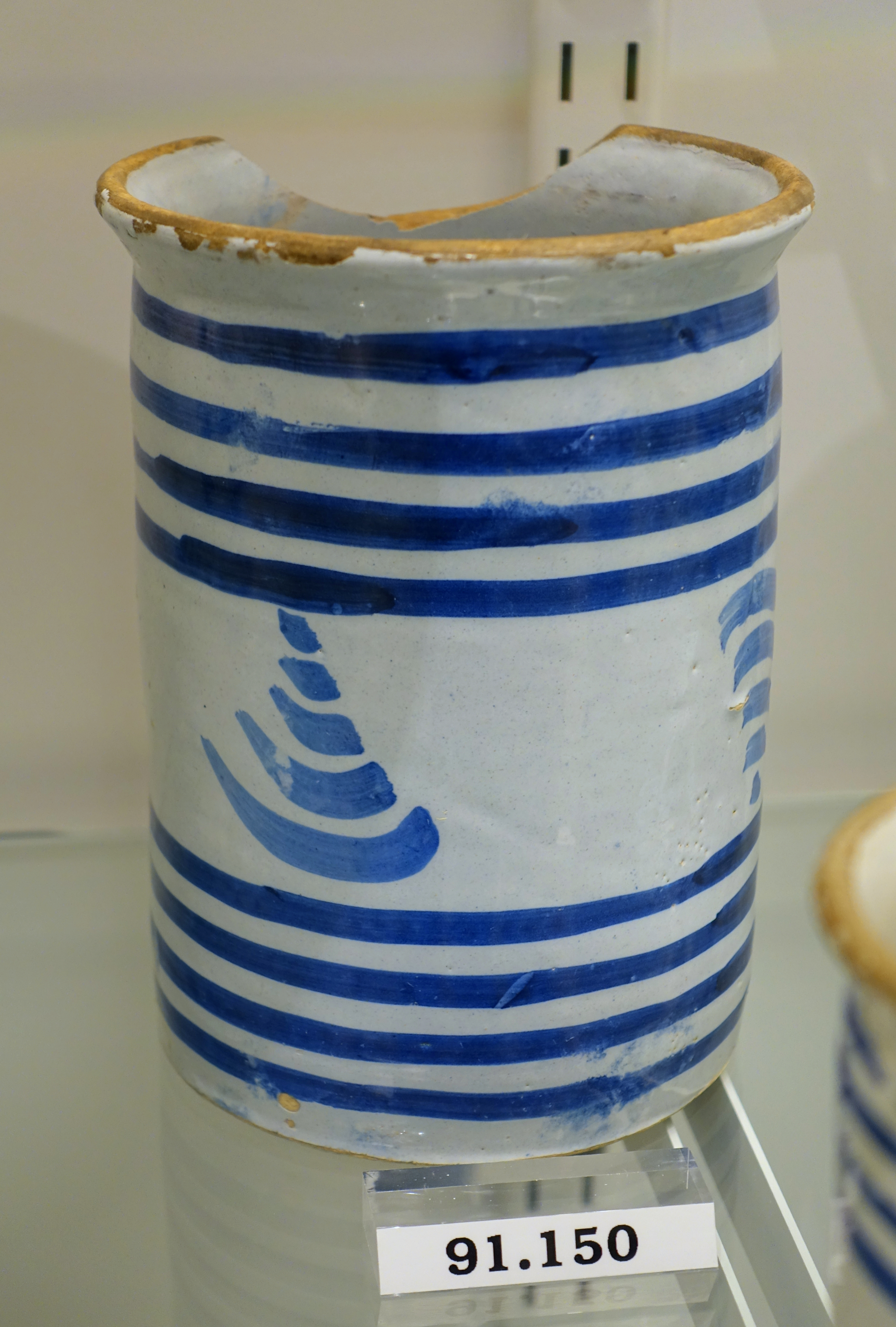
English gallipot, a container used for storing liquid confections such as syrups and conserves, c. 1760.

Sticks of pulled sugar called al fänäd were used in the Middle East as a remedy for cough and fever, and English apothecaries frequently sold these as alphenics (the precursors to modern cough drops). Cordial waters, adapted into dessert-like refreshments after the Renaissance, were alcoholic infusions considered as medicine for a wide range of maladies. Sweet foods were frequently prescribed for chest ailments. Floral sugars, flavoured with violets and roses, originated in the Middle East and were touted as cough cures. Similarly, conserves of flowers and herbs were used to treat numerous ailments. Simple quince marmalade was often used as a base for medicinal preparations. One such medicine for "Diseases of the Head" that was considered to cure maladies ranging from fits to epilepsy was called Marmelada Cephalica. Besides quince, it consisted of salt of a man's skull, amber, and mace. Caraway and aniseed comfits, quince marmalades, spiced waters, and cordials were also consumed post-banquet to soothe indigestion in guests who had likely overeaten.

Medicines were not only prepared in the apothecary. A number of recipe books existed for household use, mainly by upper class ladies. One common domestic preparation was syrup. In a medicinal context, syrups were used to concentrate the perceived healing properties of a particular food, make bitter medicines more palatable, and as a carrier for other healing substances. Syrups could be based on a variety of flowers, fruits, spices, and herbs. Their main usage was to "soothe an inflamed organ" and invigorate weakened people, but different syrups focused on different maladies. The two most common syrups were made of violets, for lowering a fever, and roses, for taming the temper.

== The banquet ==
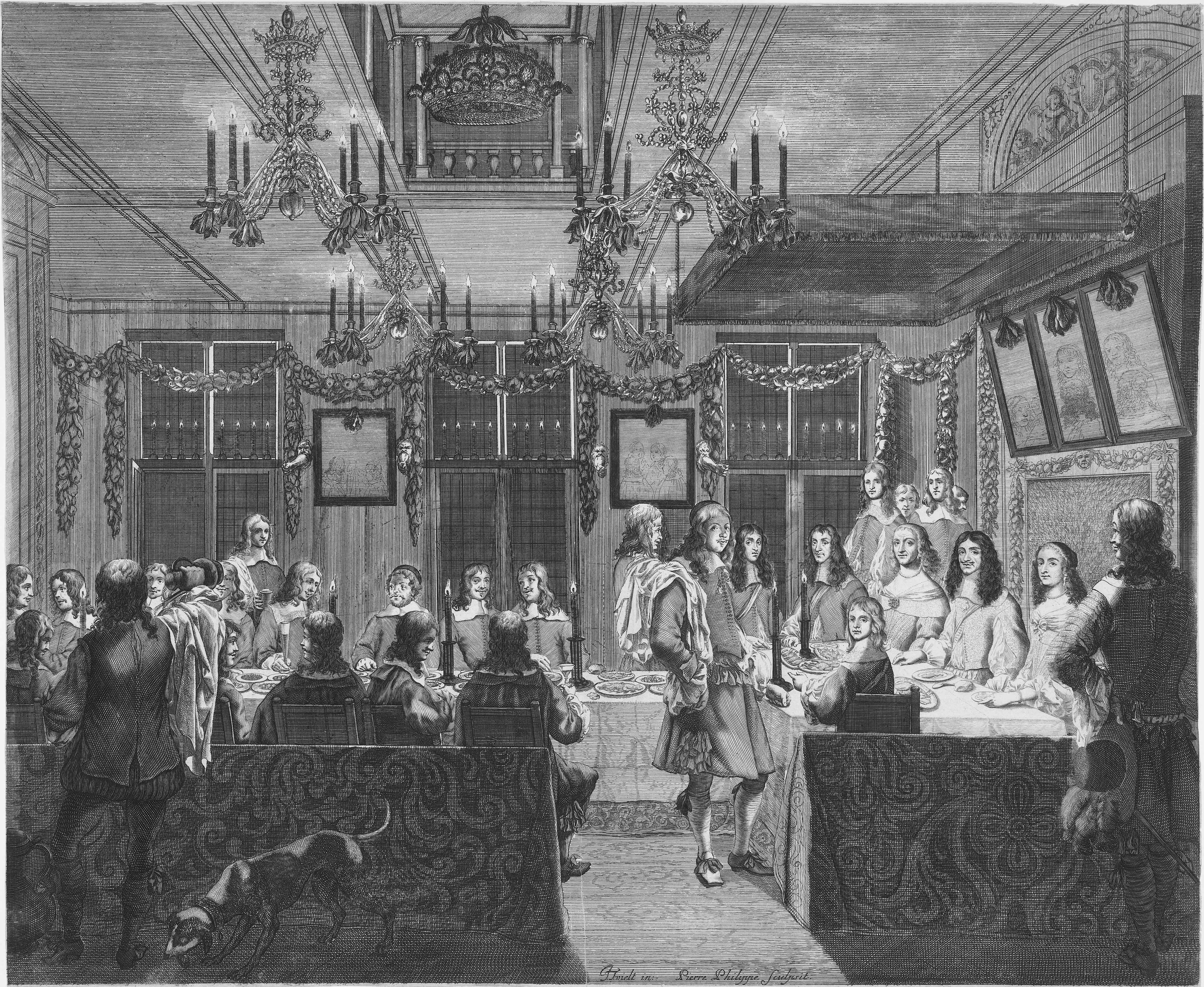
A banquet for King Charles II of England, 1660.

The English sweet banquet was an early form of the modern dessert course, consisting of sweet confections, spiced drinks, and complex sugar work served after the main meal. It evolved from the medieval "void": a post-dinner course where small treats were served after the table had been cleared, or "voided". Additionally, it was also influenced by the Italian collazione, or "sugar collation", a luxurious presentation of sweetmeats and sugar sculptures.

A banquet was a performance as well as a meal. It originated in court in the early 1500s and quickly became a status symbol among English nobility, often being served in the presence of important guests. Confectioners and hosts would put great effort into decoration and presentation. Purees of fruits such as apricots, citrus fruits, cherries, and gooseberries would be boiled with sugar and poured into intricate moulds. Once set, confectioners would create knots, words, or artificial fruits from the stiff marmalade to use as decoration. Sugar syrups would be solidified into sculptures, sometimes representing historical or mythological figures. These would serve a mainly visual purpose, not always intended for consumption. Jumbals, "intricately knotted biscuits" of Italian origin, would be shaped into letters and used to spell out topics the host wanted to discuss. Contrast between sight and taste was an important feature of presentation. At times, confectioners would purposefully create foods to "fool" the diner. Recipe books from the period include how to make, for example, an imitation ham from sugar, berries, and flowers; artichokes and asparagus from marzipan; and "objects, such as coats of arms".

Sweetmeats frequently served in banquets included fruits preserved in sugar syrup (known as "suckets"), marmalades, moulded fruit pastes, comfits, conserves, and biscuits. Quince marmalade was a common feature of Elizabethan-era banquets, served in tandem with other preserves. A common practice after a meal would be to "seal" or placate the stomach with quince marmalade. Comfits and cordial waters served a similar purpose, which were consumed to counteract the effects of eating too much.

== In literature and onstage ==
Banquets often appear in Shakespeare's plays. In The Tempest, Ariel taunts shipwrecked sailors by making a banquet appear and disappear. Julia Reinhard Lupton interprets this scene as "a demonstration of the violation of humanist convivial ideals in courtly culture". Romeo and Juliet demonstrates the setting of a banquet in act 1, scene 5, and Capulet acts in a way that suggests it is not important. Critics state that banquet scenes such as these illustrate the divide between servants assembling the banquet and nobility who feast at it.

John Webster's The Duchess of Malfi includes a scene where the title character's last words are "giv'st my little boy/ Some syrup for his cold". This has been interpreted as a transition from a "disobedient wife" to a "tender mother". Wendy Wall focuses on syrup as a domestic symbol and relates it to noblewomen's common practice of making household medicines.

== See also ==
- Jacques de Bousie, confectioner at the Scottish court
- Manus Christi
