= Ontbijtkoek =

Spiced rye cake

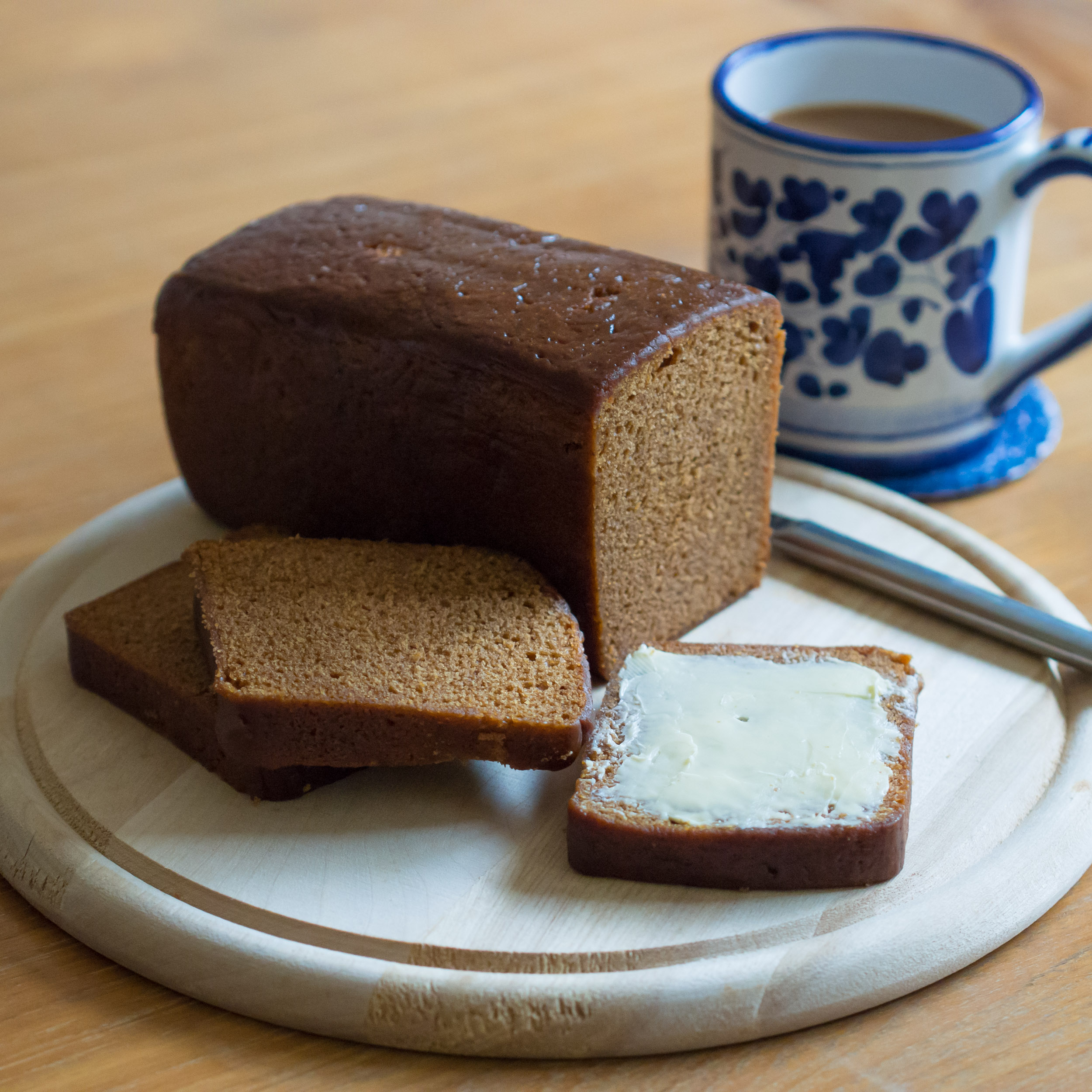
- Ontbijtkoek is often eaten with butter
- Alternative names: Peperkoek, Kruidkoek
- Type: Spice cake
- Place of origin: Netherlands, Belgium
- Main ingredients: Rye, cloves, cinnamon, ginger, succade, nutmeg
- Variations: Oudewijvenkoek
- Food energy (per serving): 100 kcal (420 kJ)

An ontbijtkoek (Dutch pronunciation: [ɔndˈbɛitkuk]; lit. 'breakfast cake'), peperkoek (pronounced [ˈpeːpərˌkuk]; 'pepper cake') or kruidkoek (pronounced [ˈkrœytkuk]; 'spice cake') is a Dutch and Flemish spiced cake. Rye and dark brown basterdsuiker are its most important ingredient, coloring the cake light brown. It is often spiced with cloves, cinnamon, ginger, succade and nutmeg. Several parts of the Netherlands have their own local recipe, of which the most famous is oudewijvenkoek (old woman's cake), which is mostly eaten in the northern regions, and is flavored with aniseed. Ontbijtkoek is traditionally served at breakfast with a thick layer of butter on top, as a replacement for bread, however, due to its sweet taste it is also served as a snack. It is best eaten the day after it is baked, but has a shelf life of several weeks at room temperatures without spoiling due to the pH, sugar content, and spices.

Ontbijtkoek resembles somewhat a soft gingerbread cake, but with much less ginger, hardly any fat, and more sugar. The sugar used is the typical Dutch basterdsuiker, an aromatic, moist and fine sugar, which gives a baking product its typical brown color and smooth texture. Basterdsuiker is protected by the EU and acknowledged as a traditional speciality, guaranteed.

It is also used for koekhappen, a Dutch traditional game.

Ontbijtkoek is also found in Indonesia due to its historical colonization by the Netherlands.

== Acrylamide ==
It has been found that ontbijtkoek can contain high levels of acrylamide, which was once regarded as a potential carcinogen.

== See also ==
- Gingerbread
- Coffee cake
- Lekach
