= Martha Washington's Booke of Cookery =

Recipe collection owned by Martha Washington

Martha Washington's Booke of Cookery (Note: The full title being: Martha Washington's and Booke of Sweetmeats: being a Family Manuscript, curiouslyccopied by an unknown Hand sometime in the seventeenth century, which was in her Keeping from 1749, the time of her Marriage to Daniel Custis, to 1799, at which time she gave tt to Eleanor Parke Custis, her grandaughter, on the occasion of her Marriage to Lawrence Lewis) is the name given to a manuscript cookbook that was owned by Martha Washington, the First Lady of the United States, for fifty years. Despite Washington's association with the text, she was not the book's author, and was only one owner of several, with some before and others after. It is among the few personal recipe collections that still remain from colonial America.

The manuscript's frontispiece cites Frances Parke Custis as the book's author, Washington's mother-in-law via her first marriage. This is contested, with some historians crediting the 17th-century Virginia resident Frances Culpeper Berkeley or an earlier author in England.

The manuscript consists of two parts: A Booke of Cookery, and A Booke of Sweetmeats, and contains over 500 recipes. It was published in 1892 under the title Martha Washington's or the Mother's Cook Book, and in 1981, the food historian Karen Hess published a transcribed edition that was annotated and introduced. The text is also known under the name Washington manuscript, and at least by the historian Rebecca Sharpless, the Berkeley manuscript.

== Use and transmission ==
Manuscript cookbooks were common among the affluent of Medieval Europe, and when wealthy settlers emigrated to North America, they brought the custom with them, continuing to pass texts across generations.

The lineage of Martha Washington's Booke of Cookery is uncertain. The food historian Karen Hess traces its earliest identifiable possession to Frances Culpeper Berkeley, a woman born in Kent, South England, in 1634 to a wealthy family. Around 1650, Berkeley emigrated with her family to the colony of Virginia; it is around this time, writes Hess, that the text may have come to America, if it was not compiled in the kitchens of Berkeley.

Berkeley would likely not have cooked the recipes of her manuscript, but they would have been prepared in her upper-class kitchen by skilled chefs, using ingredients such as sugar, wheat, and spices that were inaccessible to most of the population. In Virginia, Berkeley was successively married to three powerful men, including William Berkeley, who served as governor of the colony from 1660 to 1677. There are records of Berkeley owning slaves, who may have occupied some of the roles in Berkeley's kitchen, preparing dishes from the manuscript. Hess traces the text's possession from Berkeley to her stepdaughter Jane Ludwell Parke (1668?–1708), who in turn gave the manuscript to her daughter Frances Parke Custis. Custis is inscribed in extant copies as the text's author.

Around 1714 or 1715, Custis died. While the book was intended for her daughter, Custis' daughter had died without having offspring, and the manuscript passed on to her husband to be inherited by Custis's son, Daniel Parke Custis, and when Daniel married Martha Dandridge in 1749, it passed on to her. Martha Dandridge Custis maintained possession of the text for the next five decades, in which time she became widowed and then married to George Washington, becoming Martha Washington. Hess suspects the book would have been used little by Washington, who likely would have perceived the recipes to be old-fashioned. In 1799, Washington gave the book to her granddaughter, Eleanor Parke Custis Lewis. Lewis already had a manuscript book, including two recipes copied from Washington's, and the historian Janet Theophano proposes that it was at this time that the manuscript was retired, and kept as an heirloom. The book continued to be passed on among Washington's descendent's until 1892, when it was given to the Historical Society of Pennsylvania.

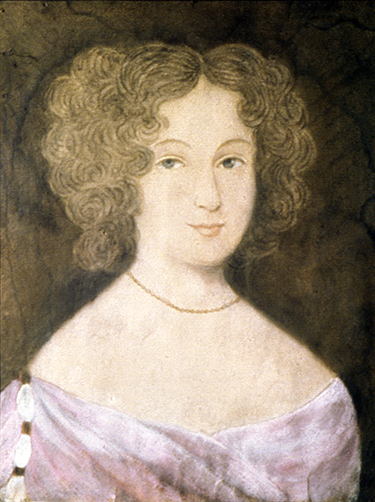
Portrait of Frances Culpeper Berkeley, c. 1660

Portrait of Frances Parke Custis

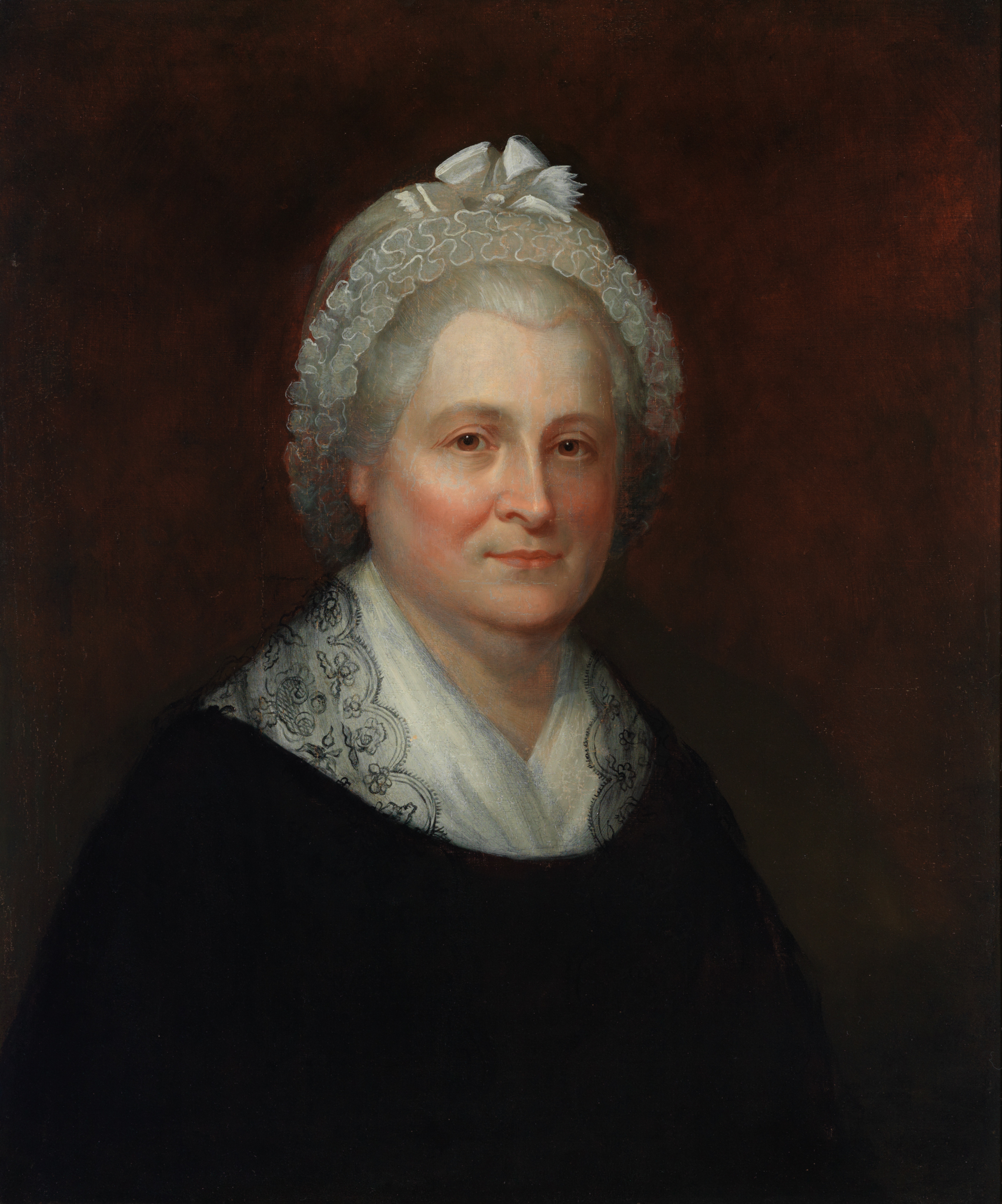
Martha Washington, c. 1796

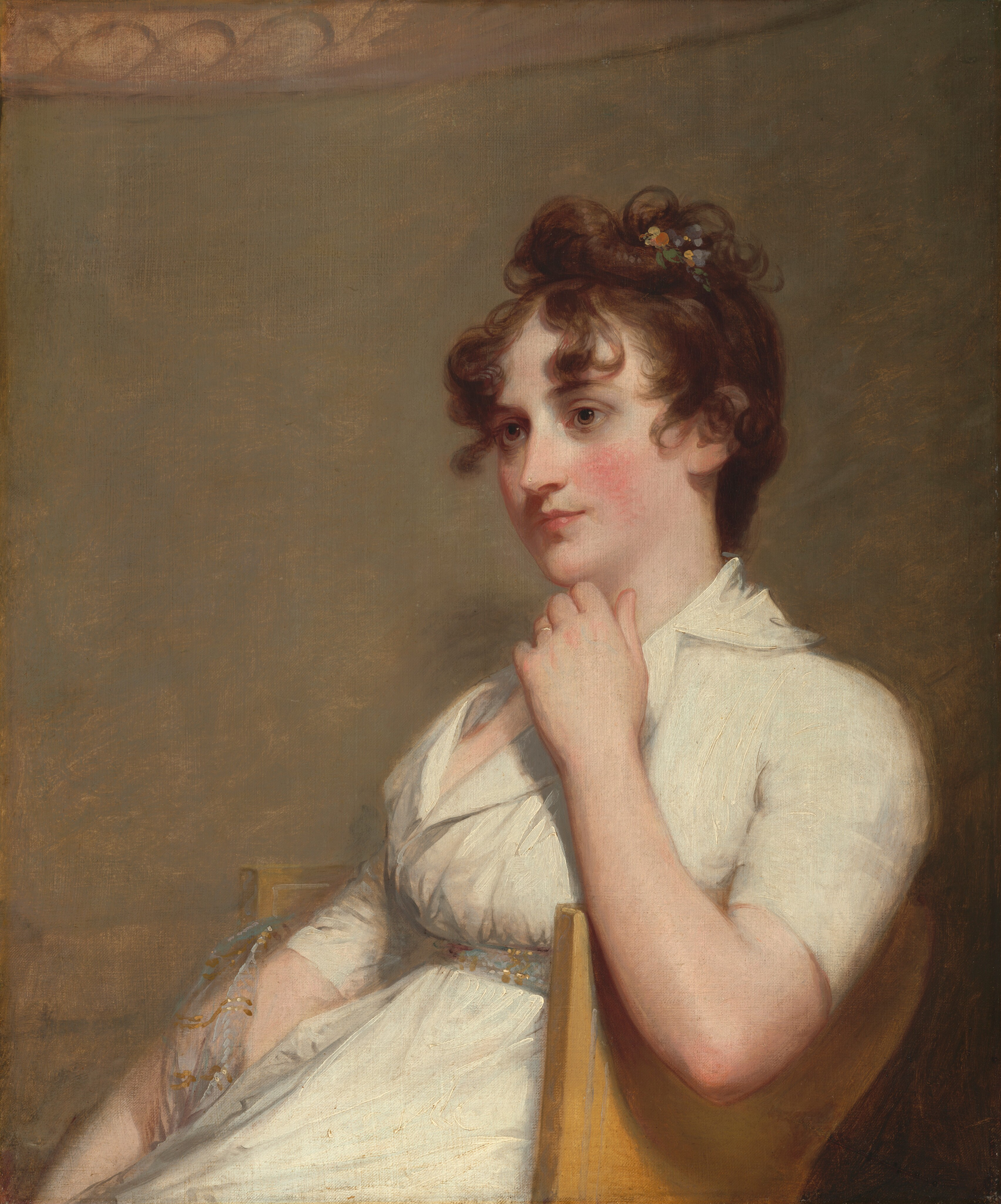
Eleanor Parke Custis Lewis, 1804

== Contents ==
The text is a book of recipes, handwritten and bound in brown leather. The booklet measures 6 by 8 in (15 by 20 cm), around the size of an A5 sheet of paper, and is made up of two parts: A Booke of Cookery, and A Booke of Sweetmeats. It may be the original document or a copy of an older edition. Its pages are substantially soiled with water, oil, and burns; markings have been made on the text, by at least seven individuals.

Hess dates the recipes to the mid-1500s through 1625, at a time when the cookery of the European elite was moving from medieval tastes to a more subdued use of spices, more soups and less pottages, but not yet adding flour to sauces in the form of roux. Despite its developments, medieval preferences persisted in combinations of fruit with spices and sugar. The recipes that are included span a broad range of preparations, including simple dishes such as hearth-baked griddle cakes (old-fashioned pancakes), roasts, and raspberry marmalade. A number of recipes for baked goods are provided, for the most part sweets.

205 recipes are included for dishes to be served at first-courses and second-courses, which make up the text of the section A Booke of Cookery. The section A Booke of Sweetmeats contains a further 268 recipes on preserves, syrups, and 'banquetting stuff', 43 preparations of medicinal distilled waters, and 15 household tips and perfume preparations.

== Publication ==
A transcribed edition was published by the food historian Karen Hess in 1981 via Columbia University Press, with an introduction and commentary. Initially printed as a hardcover, a paperback edition was released in 1996. Hess released her text at a time when food history had received little scholarly attention, which Hess suggested may have been caused by her assessment that "few scholars are cooks—and fewer cooks scholars." Hess published the book four years after the release of The Taste of America, which she had released with her husband John L. Hess. The Taste of America was a polemic, written against contemporary food culture in America, arguing its preferences were poor and its historical rigor weak.

In her edition, Hess challenged the idea that the book was written by Custis, analysing handwriting, the recipes, and genealogies to provide her theory of the book's transmission through Berkeley. Hess's work went into great detail; the food historian Sandra Sherman describes Hess's interpretations going to "extraordinary lengths", with a digression on marchepan (marzipan) going over three pages. A review of the publication by Alan Davidson described a work that almost borders on overdetail, while remaining largely engaging and well constructed. Hess's annotations were given further praise in a review in American Heritage magazine.

Hess's publication has proved influential in the study of American food history. Sandra Oliver, the food historian described in 2006 that "Nearly everyone who delves into food history must turn sooner or later to Martha Washington's Booke of Cookery."

== See also ==
- Elinor Fettiplace's Receipt Book

== Sources ==
- Davidson, Alan E (1981). "Martha Washington's Booke of Cookery, with Introduction and Commentary by Karen Hess". Petits Propos Culinaires. 8: 65. doi:10.1558/ppc.34123.
- Eden, Trudy (2010) [2008]. The Early American Table: Food and Society in the New World. DeKalb, Illinois: Northern Illinois University Press. ISBN 978-0-87580-383-8.
- Hess, Karen (1981). Martha Washington's Booke of Cookery. New York: Columbia University Press. ISBN 0-231-04930-7.
- "Martha Washington's Booke of Cookery". American Heritage. Vol. 47, no. 4. July–August 1996.
- Sharpless, Rebecca (2022). Grain and Fire: A History of Baking in the American South. Chapel Hill, North Carolina: The University of North Carolina Press. ISBN 978-1-4696-6836-9.
- Sherman, Sandra (2010). Invention of the Modern Cookbook. Santa Barbara, California: Greenwood Press. ISBN 978-1-59884-486-3.
- Smith, Andrew F. (2013). Food and Drink in American History: A "Full Course" Encyclopedia. Santa Barbara, California: ABC-CLIO. ISBN 978-1-61069-232-8.
- Oliver, Sandra (November 2006). "Ruminations on the State of American Food History". Gastronomica. 6 (4): 91–98. doi:10.1525/gfc.2006.6.4.91.
- Theophano, Janet (2002). Eat My Words: Reading Women's Lives Through the Cookbooks They Wrote. New York and Basingstoke, Hampshire: Palgrave. ISBN 0-312-23378-7.
- Wilson, C. Anne (March 1987). "A Cookery-Book and Its Context: Elizabethan Cookery and Lady Fettiplace". Petits Propos Culinaires. 25: 7–23. doi:10.1558/ppc.29753.
