= Glanmôr School =

Coordinates: 51.6218°N 3.9756°W

Location
- Glanmor Road; Swansea, West Glamorgan; United Kingdom

Information
- Established: 1922
- Closed: 1972
- Local authority: Swansea
- Headmistress: Hilda Hunt
- Gender: Girls
- Age: 11 to 18
- Houses: Girton, Lady Margaret, Newnham, Somerville, St Hilda's, St Hugh's and St David's
- Colours: Green, Gold and Navy

Glanmôr School was a secondary school in Swansea in south Wales, founded as Glanmor Central School for boys and girls in 1922 and closed by merger with Bishop Gore Comprehensive School for Boys in 1972. "Glanmôr", or "Glan y Môr", means "seaside" in English. It was situated on Glanmor Hill in Uplands in wooden ex-army buildings. As a central school it had a status between secondary and elementary until 1930, when it was defined as a secondary school. The buildings were requisitioned for the US army during the Second World War, and the boys' school closed in 1941. The girls' school continued as a grammar school until 1972. When the presence of high alumina cement in support structures of other Swansea schools caused their closure in 1974, its buildings were re-used by Olchfa Comprehensive School for two years. The site was cleared in August 1989 and replaced with housing, with the new streets named after some of the school's houses.

== History ==
=== Central school ===
The central school opened 3 April 1922 for boys and girls on the site of Cwmgwyn Farm. It was Swansea's first central school, midway between an elementary and secondary school. The single story buildings were wooden demountables, brought as World War One military surplus from Salisbury Plain. The rooms were arranged in a rectangle, with each linked by an open veranda, and this side could be opened completely in summer. Cloakrooms between rooms gave access to the large central space. The rooms were called 'the cowsheds' by the pupils of other schools. The first head of the girls' school was Clara Neal, formerly head of Terrace Road School, who became the President of the National Union of Women Teachers. She retired in 1930 at the time that Glanmor became a full secondary school.

=== Secondary school ===
In 1930 Glanmor became a full secondary school. There was a Glanmor Boys' School, closed 1941 and Glanmor Girls' School on adjacent sites. During the Second World War from 1940, the buildings were used by the military, and the children attended Oxford Street School. This was damaged during the 1941 Swansea Blitz, and the boys' school was closed. Only the girls returned when it resumed use as a school after the war. They also occupied the space previously used by the boys' school.

=== Grammar school ===
From 1945 to 1970 the school was Glanmor Grammar School for Girls, one of two grammar schools for girls within the town. There were four classes in each of Years 1–5 (North, South, East and West; previously S, R, Q and P) as well as Upper and Lower Sixth Forms. New buildings were put up for science, art and music.

=== Comprehensive ===
It became a Senior Comprehensive School for Girls in 1970, when Swansea switched to the comprehensive education system. There were 898 girls enrolled. In 1971, it was merged with the (then) Bishop Gore Senior Boys Comprehensive in Sketty, although the girls and boys remained at the separate sites. In autumn 1972, when new buildings were completed, the girls moved to the Bishop Gore site as Bishop Gore Co-educational Comprehensive school.

== School site today ==
The buildings were used by Olchfa Comprehensive School while it had to close between 1974 and 1976 while high alumina cement used during its construction was removed. They were also used as an annex by Gorseinon College of Further Education. In the early 1980s there were proposals within the local education authority to use the site for a Welsh-medium 11 – 13 or 11 – 16 comprehensive school for West Glamorgan but these were not carried out. The buildings were demolished in 1989 and housing built on the site.

== Alumni ==
Notable Old Boys and Girls include:

- Lesley Chamberlain, author
- Sue Griffith, (1953–2011) Head, Fine Art and Contextual Studies, Swansea Metropolitan University
- Anne Haden, Chair of Friends of Cwmdonkin Park, previously Director Dylan Thomas Birthplace
- Hugh Rees, MP Swansea West 1959–64
- Alexandra Roe, Director Attic Gallery for contemporary art, Swansea
- Liz Slade, Director Swansea Young Single Homeless Project
- Hilary Walker, (at Glanmor 1959 – 1966) Co-founder Wonder Years Centre of Excellence in the Gambia
- Thelma Wheatley, author and campaigner, past president Autism Society of Toronto, Canada
- C. Anne Wilson (1927–2023) University librarian and food historian.
