= Lesley Chamberlain =

British author

Lesley Chamberlain (born 26 September 1951, Rochford, Essex) is a British author who has written in a number of different genres — travel writing, food writing, Russian history, German history, fiction — after beginning as a journalist.

Following her secondary education at Glanmôr Grammar School for Girls, she studied German and Russian at Exeter and Oxford Universities.

After working as a correspondent for Reuters beginning in 1978, she moved to full-time writing; her first of her nine books was published in 1982. She has written for The Independent, The Times Literary Supplement and Prospect magazine.

Chamberlain is married to Pavel Seifter, a former Czech ambassador to the United Kingdom.

== Arc of Utopia (2017) ==
Chamberlain here starts with Kant's aesthetic understanding of the human capacities for imagination and self-transformation. She traces the influence of these ideas on subsequent artistic visions of beauty. Such a self-understanding of inherent human creativity came to inspire thoughts of revolutionary political change. Her discussion traces this inspiration's philosophical evolution, and also follows its transplant from Germany to Russia during the long 19th century. From Schiller's plays and Hegel's dialectic it traveled to Herzen, from Fichte to Bakunin, and by various paths from Schelling, Heine, Feuerbach and Marx to Turgenev, Dostoevsky, and Plekhanov. The eventual destination was the tragic Bolshevik revolution of 1917 and civil war that followed. After an initial release of creative energy, the unfortunate final result was not the "new kind of living" sought by some, but instead a "metaphysical disappointment", a "philosophical perversity" that led to a party dictatorship over a "harshly policed" industrial state.

"The great revolutionary art of 1895-1922" terminated. The "whole utopian journey" became an "abject self parody". The "freedom and openness" of the imagination "was not allowed to last" in the Soviet Union.

== Select bibliography ==
- The Food and Cooking of Russia, 1982
- Volga, Volga. A journey down Russia's great river, 1995
- Nietzsche in Turin. The end of the future, 1996
- The Secret Artist: A Close Reading of Sigmund Freud, Quartet, 2000
- Motherland A Philosophical History of Russia, Atlantic Books, 2004
- Lenin's Private War: The Voyage of the Philosophy Steamer and the Exile of the Intelligentsia, St Martin's Press, 2007; UK: The Philosophy Steamer Lenin and the Exile of the Intelligentsia, Atlantic Books, 2006
- A Shoe Story: Van Gogh, the Philosophers, and the West (Chelmsford: Harbour 2014)
- Arc of Utopia: The Beautiful Story of the Russian Revolution (London: Reaktion 2017)
- Street Life and Morals. German philosophy in Hitler's lifetime (London: Reaction 2021)
- Rilke: The Last Inward Man (London: Pushkin Press 2022)
- In December 2024, Lesley Chamberlain wrote that, because [Thomas] Mann's works "have come out of copyright in the US, and will do so in the UK from the start of 2026", "[m]y own translations of Death in Venice, and separately of three of the short stories, will appear soon after that date, to be followed by a new English version of Buddenbrooks".
