= John L. Hess =

American journalist

- Born: December 27, 1917; New York City, New York, USA
- Died: January 21, 2005 (aged 87); New York City, New York, USA
- Occupations: Journalist, Writer, Food critic
- Notable credit: My Times: A Memoir of Dissent
- Spouse: Karen Hess

John L. Hess (December 27, 1917 – January 21, 2005) was a prominent American investigative journalist who worked for many years at The New York Times. He left the Times in 1978 and wrote a memoir about his years there, My Times: A Memoir of Dissent.

== Biography ==
Hess was born in New York City, and studied history at City College of New York. He began in journalism with the Bisbee Daily Review in Bisbee, Arizona, a town controlled by the Phelps Dodge copper company, but he left the newspaper — also owned by Phelps Dodge — when it interfered with his reporting. He served in the United States Merchant Marine during World War II.

After jobs with United Press, the Associated Press, New York Daily News, and The New York Post, Hess started working at the Times in 1954; first on the foreign copy desk, later becoming a night-shift reporter. In 1964, he moved to Paris to help start a European edition of the International Herald Tribune.

He returned to New York City in 1972 and was briefly the Times' food editor. Hess hated the term "gourmet" because he believed that those who used the term sought or advertised prestige and price rather than quality and taste. He once gave the neighborhood of Chinatown four stars - the only four stars he awarded while the Times food editor. The Taste of America, which he co-wrote with his wife Karen Hess, excoriated American cooking and singled out such celebrity chefs as Julia Child and Craig Claiborne as contributing to the decline of the American palate.

In 1974, he won a citation from the US Department of Health, Education and Welfare for an investigation into corrupt nursing home operators.

After his retirement, Hess contributed regularly to The Nation, CounterPunch and Extra!, among other publications, in addition to work in television and radio journalism. He also served as media watchdog for WBAI, the New York City listener-sponsored radio station.

In addition to his memoirs, Hess also published several other books: Vanishing France, The Case for De Gaulle, and The Grand Acquisitors, about the business of art museums.

John Hess died in Manhattan on January 21, 2005, of pneumonia at the age of 87.
