= Amelia Simmons =

American writer

- Born: Albany, New York, U.S.
- Occupation: Author
- Notable works: American Cookery

Amelia Simmons was an American writer noted for publishing the American Cookery. This cookbook is considered an important text that provided insights into the language and culinary practices of former colonists, helping shape American identity. It is considered the first cookbook published in the United States by a person of European-American ancestry. A majority of the recipes were copied from English cookbooks.

She may not have existed.

== Biography ==
Little is known about Simmons' life except that she was an orphan. She was left to the care of several guardians and this was said to have helped shape her character, one that had an opinion and determination of her own.

Simmons earned her living as a domestic worker. She was later described as a woman of modest means. In her published book, it was noted that she was preoccupied with that status in life. In her own words, Simmons claimed she was "circumscribed in her knowledge" and lacked "an education sufficient to prepare the work for the press."

According to the historian Karen Hess, Simmons probably lived in New York's Albany area, which was the center of the manufacture of potash, a prominent ingredient in Simmons' recipes. The likelihood of this theory is supported by Simmons' use of some words that are Dutch in origin (for example, slaw and cookey).

=== American Cookery ===
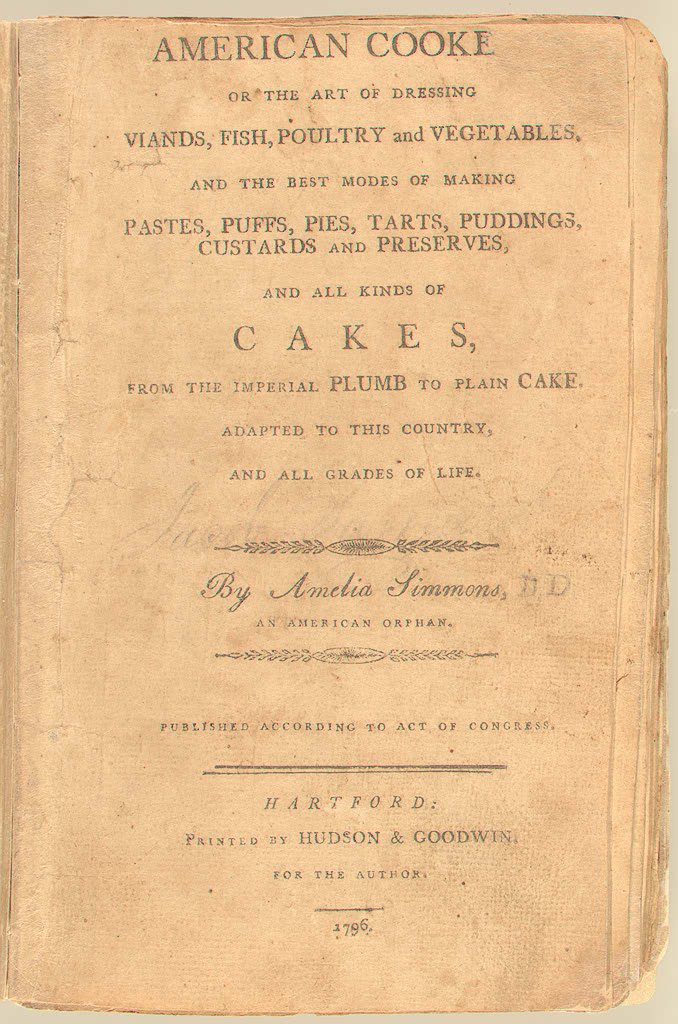
First Edition of American Cookery

Simmons' cookbook, American Cookery was published in 1796. During this period, all cookbooks used in the colonies were British. The book contained practical recipes that catered to the wider American audience as well as meals that appealed to those who had larger budget as it taught its readers "how to eat simply but sumptuously". This work is considered significant for addressing the deficiencies of extant British cookbooks since it understood American culture. The cookbook was described as a place that acknowledged British heritage and introduced a new kind of cuisine and citizen cook. Its preface claimed that it was "adapted to this country". While a majority of the recipes were copied from British cookbooks, it also included meals that had indigenous American recipes or meals that substituted native American ingredients. Several of the recipes in the cookbook that were copied from British sources were largely from the works of Susannah Carter. Simmons copied her entries on creams and syllabubs but she introduced new ingredients such as cornmeal, pumpkins, and molasses. Such copying was said to be commonplace and Simmons' recipes also suffered from the same practice later on.

The United States Library of Congress, owning one of the only four known first edition copies, designated the American Cookery as one of "88 Books That Shaped America".
