= Karen Hess =

American historian (1918–2007)

- Born: November 11, 1918; Blair, Nebraska, U.S.
- Died: May 15, 2007 (aged 88); New York City, U.S.
- Education: Humboldt State University
- Occupation: Culinary historian
- Spouse: John L. Hess

Karen Loft Hess (November 11, 1918 – May 15, 2007) was an American culinary historian. Her 1977 book The Taste of America co-authored with her husband, John L. Hess, established them as anti-establishment members of the culinary world.

== Life and career ==
Born in Blair, Nebraska, she attended Humboldt State University in Arcata, California, where she majored in music. Her husband was later a journalist (and for a short time in 1973–1974, food editor/critic) for The New York Times. Among their targets were celebrity chefs Craig Claiborne, James Beard and Julia Child. Hess sought to bring a historic rigor to cooking. The New York Times said in her obituary: "Ms. Hess, known as a kind but combative personality, did not shrink from taking on the icons of American cookery, who she felt presented a false picture not only of the quality of American food and cooking but also of its history."

She encouraged the publication of—and wrote the introduction/historical notes for—a facsimile of the rare second edition of American Cookery (Applewood Books, 1996), the first known American cookbook, written by Amelia Simmons, and originally published in 1796. She also annotated What Mrs. Fisher Knows About Old Southern Cooking (Applewood Books, 1995), one of the oldest known African-American cookbooks, originally published in 1881.

In 1985, Hess became one of the founding members of The Culinary Historians of New York, an association of food professionals, historians, and others interested in studying and writing on the history of food. On October 19, 2004, The Culinary Historians of New York presented her with their first annual Amelia Award, an award which recognizes excellence in culinary history.

In 2006, she was listed in the eighth annual Saveur 100, from Saveur magazine, in an article by Shane Mitchell entitled "The Grandest Dame of American Culinary History". Mitchell says that although Hess came from Nebraska, her "soul must be Southern". Hess's The Carolina Rice Kitchen is the story of how rice from Africa became a South Carolina Low Country staple, as well as how the African cooks shaped Southern cooking.

Hess died on May 15, 2007, in New York City (in Manhattan) after suffering a stroke the week before.

== Bibliography ==
=== As annotator/editor ===
- English Bread & Yeast Cookery, by Elizabeth David. American Edition with notes by Karen Hess, New York: Viking Press, 1980, ISBN 978-0-670-29653-8
- Martha Washington's Booke of Cookery. Columbia University Press, 1981, ISBN 978-0-231-04930-6
- Mary Randolph's 'Virginia Housewife'. University of South Carolina Press, 1983, ISBN 978-0-87249-423-7
- What Mrs. Fisher Knows About Old Southern Cooking Applewood Books, 1995, ISBN 978-1-55709-403-2
- American Cookery by Amelia Simmons [1796], Applewood Books, 1996, ISBN 978-1-55709-439-1
- The Art of Cookery Made Plain and Easy [1805] by Mrs. Hannah Glasse. Facsimile edition annotated by Karen Hess, Applewood Books (1998) ISBN 978-1-55709-462-9

=== As author ===
- The Taste of America. University of Illinois Press, 1977, ISBN 978-0-87249-640-8 Co-authored with John L. Hess
- The Carolina Rice Kitchen: The African Connection. University of South Carolina Press, 1992, ISBN 978-1-57003-208-0
