= Keith Stavely and Kathleen Fitzgerald =

American food historians

Keith Stavely (born 1942) and Kathleen Fitzgerald (born 1952) are an American married couple who have written on the history of New England food. They have authored four books together: America's Founding Food: The Story of New England Cooking (2004), Northern Hospitality: Cooking by the Book in New England (2011), United Tastes: The Making of the First American Cookbook (2017), and Northern Comfort: The New England Baking Tradition (2026).

== Biography ==
Keith W. F. Stavely was born in 1942 in New Jersey and was brought up in Terre Haute, Indiana. His ancestors were among the early settlers of the New England region. In the mid-1960s, Stavely moved to Connecticut to study. At the decade's end, he received a PhD in English literature from Yale with a dissertation on the poetry of John Milton. In the 1970s he took a position at Boston University as an English professor, where he met Kathleen Fitzgerald. Fitzgerald was born in 1952 and was raised in the New England region. Born into an Irish-Catholic family, she later recalled a childhood diet of typical New England fare, including chowder and baked beans.

In 1975, Stavely published Politics of Milton's Prose Style through Yale University Press. Therein, he argued that the style of Milton's prose, in its aspirations to rhetorical resolution, strayed from political realities and made his political advocacy less effective. Three years later, Stavely and Fitzgerald married. In the 1980s, Stavely earned a degree in library science at Simmons University and began work as a librarian, holding several positions in Massachusetts over twenty-eight years including director of the Fall River Public Library from 1999. In 1988, while at the Watertown Free Public Library, Stavely was awarded a Guggenheim Fellowship, in the field of American Literature.

Work as a librarian was something Stavely shared with Fitzgerald. In Massachusetts, she spent time working at the Newport Public Library and the Needham Public Library. Aside from work as a librarian, Fitzgerald has also worked as a college chaplain. In 1996, the pair began residing in Jamestown, Rhode Island; as of 2014, they split their time between there and Cambridge, Massachusetts.

In the early 2000s, Stavely and Fitzgerald began co-authoring books on the culinary history of New England. Their research involves consulting cookbooks—published and unpublished—as well as other primary sources including diaries and novels. In 2008, Stavely retired as a librarian while Fitzgerald kept working. As of 2017 she the director of the Willett Free Library on Saunderstown, Rhode Island. The couple maintained a blog, where they published old recipes and their efforts at reproducing them.

== Books ==
In 2004, Stavely and Fitzgerald published America's Founding Food: The Story of New England Cooking through the University of North Carolina Press. It was reviewed in The New England Quarterly by Barbara Haber. They followed this with Northern Hospitality: Cooking by the Book in New England in 2011, published by the University of Massachusetts Press. This was reviewed by Lucy Long in Gastronomica. In 2017, the pair published United Tastes: The Making of the First American Cookbook, again through the University of Massachusetts Press. This was reviewed in The Journal of American History by Tamara Plakins Thornton, in The New England Quarterly by Megan J Elias, and in Petits Propos Culinaires by Blake Perkins.

== Bibliography ==
- Stavely, Keith; Fitzgerald, Kathleen (2004). America's Founding Food: The Story of New England Cooking. Chapel Hill, North Carolina & London: The University of North Carolina Press. ISBN 0-8078-2894-7.
- Stavely, Keith; Fitzgerald, Kathleen (2011). Northern Hospitality: Cooking by the Book in New England. Amherst & Boston: University of Massachusetts Press. ISBN 978-1-55849-861-7.
- Stavely, Keith; Fitzgerald, Kathleen (2017). United Tastes: The Making of the First American Cookbook. Amherst & Boston, Massachusetts: University of Massachusetts. ISBN 978-1-62534-322-2.
- Stavely, Keith; Fitzgerald, Kathleen (2026). Northern Comfort: The New England Baking Tradition. New York University Press. ISBN 978-1-4798-4971-0.
