= C. Anne Wilson =

British food historian (1927–2023)

Constance Anne Wilson (12 July 1927 – 8 January 2023) was a Welsh food historian and librarian.

== Early life and education ==
Wilson was born in Gower, near Swansea, the elder daughter of Rowland Wilson (later Professor of Mathematics at Swansea University) and his wife Constance Laycock. She attended Mumbles primary school and Glanmor Grammar School for Girls, Swansea, and then read Classics at Girton College, Cambridge (where her mother had read Mathematics). She subsequently obtained a London postgraduate diploma in the Archaeology of the Iron Age and the Roman Provinces.

== Career ==
In 1961, Wilson was appointed an Assistant Librarian in the Brotherton Library at the University of Leeds. She was subject librarian for classics, archaeology, and ancient history, to which she subsequently added art and music. In the mid-1960s she catalogued the John F. Preston collection of historic cookery books (at the time a recent gift to the Library), which led to her developing an interest in food history. She published the wide-ranging Food and Drink in Britain in 1973, and her more specialised The Book of Marmalade: its antecedents, its history and its rôle in the world today won the 1984 Diagram Prize for the oddest title of the year at the Frankfurt Book Fair. In 2006 she published Water of Life: a history of wine-distilling and spirits; 500 BC - AD 2000. She edited several volumes of the proceedings of the Leeds Symposium on Food History and Tradition.

Wilson retired from Leeds in 1992.

== Death ==
Wilson died on 8 January 2023, at the age of 95.

== Works ==
- 1973: Food and Drink in Britain from the Stone Age to Recent Times. London: Constable ISBN 0-09-456040-4
- 1984: Philosophers, iōsis and Water of Life. Leeds: Leeds Philosophical and Literary Society
- 1985: The Book of Marmalade: its antecedents, its history and its rôle in the world today, together with a collection of recipes for marmalades & marmalade cookery. London: Constable ISBN 0-09-465670-3
- 2006: Water of Life: a history of wine-distilling and spirits from 500 BC - AD 2000. Totnes: Prospect Books ISBN 1-903018-46-3

=== As editor ===
- 1991: "Banquetting stuffe": the fare and social background of the Tudor and Stuart banquet (Proceedings of the 1st Leeds Symposium on Food History and Traditions). Edinburgh: Edinburgh UP ISBN 0-7486-0103-1
- 1991: The Appetite and the Eye: visual aspects of food and its presentation within their historic context (Proceedings of the 2nd Leeds Symposium on Food History and Traditions). Edinburgh: Edinburgh UP ISBN 0-7486-0101-5
- 1991: Traditional Food East and West of the Pennines (Proceedings of the 3rd Leeds Symposium on Food History and Traditions), Edinburgh UP, 1991 ISBN 0-7486-0118-X
- 1991: Waste Not, Want Not: food preservation from early times to the present day. Edinburgh: Edinburgh UP ISBN 0-7486-0119-8
- 1993: "Liquid Nourishment": potable foods and stimulating drinks (Proceedings of the 5th Leeds Symposium on Food History and Traditions). Edinburgh: Edinburgh UP ISBN 0-7486-0424-3
- 1993: Food for the community : special diets for special groups (Proceedings of the 6th Leeds Symposium on Food History and Traditions). Edinburgh: Edinburgh UP ISBN 0-7486-0431-6
- 1993: Traditional Country House Cooking. London: Weidenfeld & Nicolson ISBN 0-297-83137-2
- 1994: Luncheon, Nuncheon and Other Meals: eating with the Victorians. Stroud: Sutton ISBN 0-7509-0528-X
  - 2004: Eating with the Victorians. Stroud: Sutton (Previous ed. published as: Luncheon, nuncheon and other meals, 1994.)
- 1998: The Country House Kitchen Garden, 1600-1950: how produce was grown and how it was used (Based on papers from the 10th Leeds Symposium on Food History and Traditions). Stroud: Sutton ISBN 0-7509-1423-8
