= American Cookery =

American cookbook published in 1796

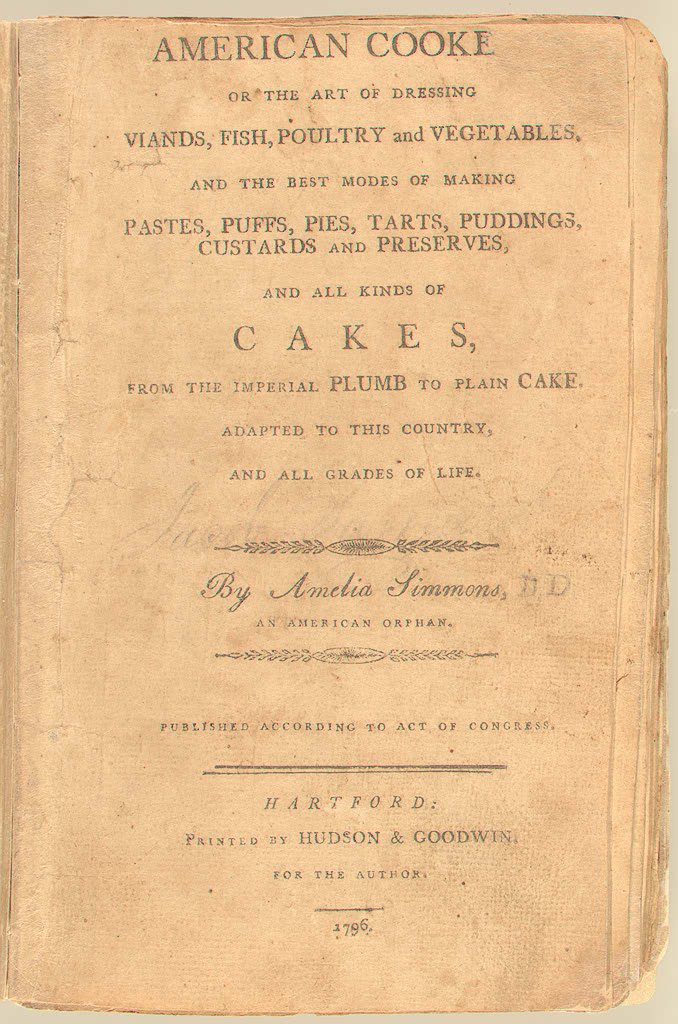
First Edition of American Cookery

American Cookery, by Amelia Simmons, is the first known cookbook written by an American, published in Hartford, Connecticut, in 1796. Until then, the cookbooks printed and used in the Thirteen Colonies were British. Its full title is:

American Cookery, or the art of dressing viands, fish, poultry, and vegetables, and the best modes of making pastes, puffs, pies, tarts, puddings, custards, and preserves, and all kinds of cakes, from the imperial plum to plain cake: Adapted to this country, and all grades of life.

== Historical context ==
Simmons' American Cookery used terms known to Americans, and ingredients that were readily available to American cooks. It was the first cookbook to include New England specialties such as Indian pudding, johnnycake, and what is now called pumpkin pie. The cookbook was the first to suggest serving cranberry with turkey, and the first to use the Hudson River Valley Dutch word cookey (now usually spelled "cookie").

The cookbook also introduced the use of pearlash, a precursor of baking soda, as a chemical leavener, starting a revolution in the making of American cakes.

The book was quite popular and was printed, reprinted and pirated for 30 years after its first appearance. Only four copies of the first edition are known to exist. It is considered by the Library of Congress to be one of the "Books That Shaped America".

The importance of this work cannot be overestimated. Its initial publication (Hartford, 1796) was, in its own way, a second Declaration of American Independence ...

— —Feeding America: The Historic American Cookbook Project

== About the author ==
The only biographical information known about the author is from the cover and title pages of her cookbook that list her as "Amelia Simmons, An American Orphan"; all else is by inference. American Cookery is her only known published work. The preface reads:

The candor of the American Ladies is solicitously intreated by the Authoress, as she is circumscribed in her knowledge, this being original work in this country.

This indicates that she probably lacked formal education. Based on other quotes from her preface, she was most likely a domestic laborer. She wrote of "those females who have parents, or brothers, or riches", and how female orphans may be "reduced to the necessity of going into families in the line of domestics".

Culinary historian Karen Hess says that because: "... the first edition is from Hartford, historians have always assumed that she was a New Englander." This assumption is bolstered by the inclusion of southern New England specialties such as Indian pudding and johnnycakes. However, many of the later editions were published from a cluster around the Hudson River Valley (e.g., Albany, Salem, Troy, Poughkeepsie, New York). Also, several Dutch words appeared in her work (for example, slaw and cookey), words that would have more likely come from that region, rather than New England. So a case can be made that Simmons more likely came from the Hudson Valley region.

Karen Hess also referred to Miss Simmons as a "good plain cook", noting the generous use and variety of herbs and the use of wine in her recipes. Simmons also showed the use of English "extraordinarily fine roasting techniques" in her recipes.

== Publication history ==
There were 13 known editions of this book published between 1796 and 1831. American Cookery has also been reprinted in several editions and formats in the 20th Century, including Oxford University Press in 1958 and Dover reprints beginning in 1984.

=== First Edition: Hartford, CT, 1796 ===
The first edition was published in 1796 by Hudson & Goodwin of Hartford, CT. The words "For the Author" on the title page likely indicate that Simmons paid the printing costs herself. The book was issued without hard covers: the title page also served as the front cover; the last page (page 48) was blank.

=== Second Edition: Albany, NY, 1796 ===
The second edition was also published in 1796, but by Charles R. and George Webster of Albany, NY. The second edition (also issued without hard covers) consists of 64 pages.

=== Other editions ===
In 1808, Lucy Emerson plagiarized Simmons's book (from the Troy, NY 1808 edition) by renaming part of the title and copying verbatim most of the rest of it. She changed the words "American Cookery" to "The New-England Cookery", but the title is otherwise almost the same. Published in Montpelier, VT in 1808.

In 1957, Mary Tolford Wilson wrote "The First American Cookbook," an essay that served as the introduction to the facsimile of the first edition of American Cookery (Hartford, 1796). This edition was originally published by Oxford University Press in 1958, and then reissued by Dover Publications in 1984.

In 1982, Gail Weesner edited and annotated a typographically reset edition with an introduction and an extensive number of individual annotations for recipes in which usage or content needed clarification. The type is easier to read, since the old-fashioned long cursive-like form of the letter "s" (called a long s) that looks like an "ƒ" has been rendered as a modern typographical short "s". Published by Rowan Tree Press (1982).

In 1996, culinary historian Karen Hess encouraged the publishing of the facsimile edition of the American Cookery's second edition (Albany, 1796) by Applewood Books, and wrote the introduction and historical notes for it. This was the Bicentennial edition of American Cookery, published in 1996.

== Importance ==
=== Use of American products ===
American Cookery is the first known cook book that brings together English cooking methods with American products. More specifically, it contains the first known printed recipes with the substitution of American maize (cornmeal) for English oats in otherwise English recipes. The recipe for Johnny Cake is believed to be the first printed version made with cornmeal. Both corn and oats are cereal grains. It also contains the first known printed recipe for turkey (which is native to North and Central America) with cranberries.

Although native Americans had been using corn for many millennia and European Americans and African Americans from earliest Pilgrim days, this book offers the first printed recipes using cornmeal.

Wilson writes: "This facsimile of the first American-written cookbook published in the United States is not only a first in cookbook literature, but an historic document. It reveals the rich variety of food Colonial Americans enjoyed, their tastes, cooking and eating habits, even their colorful language. Author Amelia Simmons worked as a domestic in Colonial America and gathered her cookery expertize from first-hand experience." By 1831, American Cookery had long been superseded by other American editions of English cookbooks, but Wilson goes on to say "But Amelia Simmons still holds her place as the mother of American cookery books. And no later work, however completely it may reflect the mores of this country, has quite the freshness of this first glimpse caught in the small mirror held up by an American Orphan."

Karen Hess writes: "Indeed, English cookbooks had long been in documented use by the Colonists, going back at least to The English Hus-wife of 1615 by Gervase Markham. ... Not one of them included specifically American recipes, although by that time a few native American products had become adopted in English cookery, beginning with turkey and so called French beans, but gradually also both sweet and white potatoes, even chocolate, vanilla, and tomatoes, and so came to be called for in English cookbooks well before the end of the eighteenth century. But we find not one cookbook written by an American, for Americans, that is, until 1796, when American Cookery appeared in Hartford, and later the same year, in Albany." Hess goes on to say: "So, again, what makes American Cookery so very American? It is precisely the bringing together of certain native American products and English culinary traditions. So English that entire chapters were "borrowed" from The Frugal Housewife by Susannah Carter, which appeared in American editions in 1772 and 1792, and yet so very American in her use of those elements."

Jan Longone writes for the Historic American Cookbook Project: "... the revolutionary and original aspects of her work lie in its recognition and use of truly American produce. There are five recipes using corn meal (corn is indigenous to America): three for Indian Pudding, one for Johnny or Hoe Cake and one for Indian Slapjacks."

=== Introduction of new leavening ===
Secondly, and probably most importantly, American Cookery is the first known printed American call for the use of a chemical leavening agent that was the precursor to modern baking powder, used to cause dough to rise in baking. At that time, it was known as potash, pearl ash, pearlash, or alkali.

Jan Longone continues by saying "Perhaps the most far-reaching innovation was the introduction of pearlash, a well-known staple in the colonial American household, as a chemical leavening in doughs. This practice eventually led to the compounding of modern baking powders." She ends with: "Thus, twenty years after the political upheaval of the American Revolution of 1776, a second revolution - a culinary revolution - occurred with the publication of a cookbook by an American for Americans."

== See also ==
- Karen Hess
- American History
- Cuisine of the United States
- Leavening agent
- Baking powder

== Bibliography ==
- Historic American Cookbook Project of Michigan State University: Feeding America. Simmons, Amelia Retrieved from on 2007-05-29.
- Simmons, Amelia. American Cookery. Oxford University Press, 1958.
- Simmons, Amelia. American Cookery 2nd ed. Applewood Books, 1996.
