= Panikos Panayi =

Cultural historian known for his books on the social history of food

Panikos Panayi (born 18 October 1962) is a cultural historian known for his books on the social history of food, immigration, and inter-ethnic relations.

== Biography ==
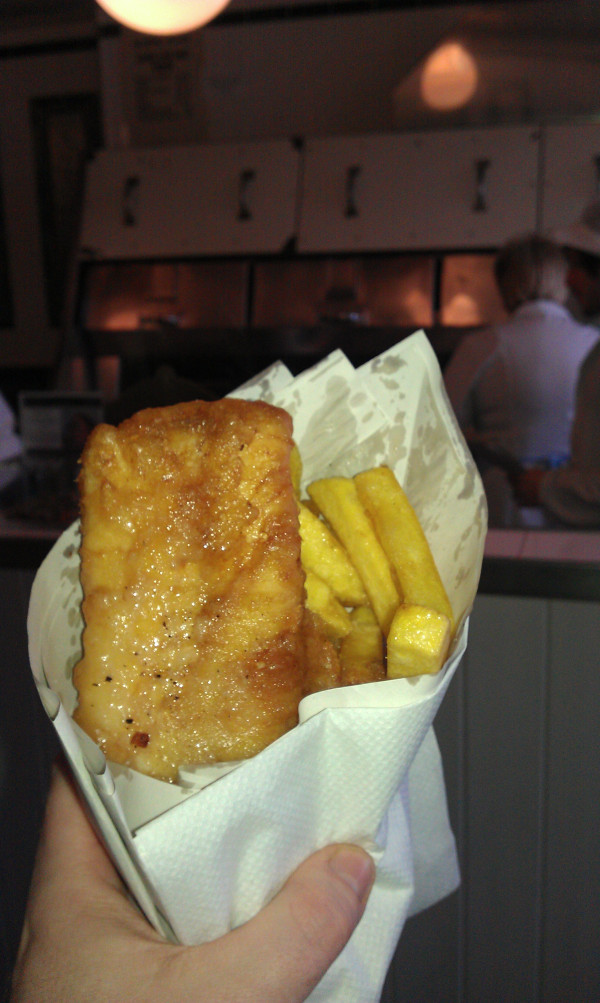
Panayi attracted global attention when he suggested in 2004 that traditional British fish and chips had foreign origins.

Panikos Panayi was born in a Greek Cypriot parents Nestora and Chrystalla who migrated to Britain. He was the oldest child with two sisters, Myllia and Roda. He completed his PhD at the University of Sheffield in 1988 on "Germans in Britain during the First World War, 1914-1918" under the supervision of Professor Colin Holmes and is part of the informally recognised Sheffield School of Migration and Prejudice. He is a cultural historian and has worked at De Montfort University in Leicester since 1990, becoming professor of European history there in 1999. He writes on the social history of food and immigration. His books have been translated into German, French, and Japanese.

In 2004 he attracted press attention, and was listed under "Know your enemy" on an extreme rightwing forum, by noting that a central element of English cuisine, fish and chips, had foreign origins, since fried fish was Jewish while chips were most likely French. Similarly, ice cream was brought to Britain by Italian street vendors in the 19th century. In his view, the popular perception that food is tied to national identity is wrong; instead, the food people eat indicates the integration of cultures. The global press reaction included the Financial Times's "Kosher French Connection with Fish and Chips", and the Daily Star headline "Le Great Breetish Feesh and Cheeps: it's Frog Nosh Claims Prof", which according to the historian Stuart Hilton triggered a hostile reaction from extreme rightwing political parties.

== Reception ==
Yasmin Alibhai-Brown, reviewing Spicing up Britain in The Independent, stated that "Panikos Panayi has written extensively about migrants. His books surprise and gratify, draw readers into the alternative history of this mongrel nation [of Britain], unmade and remade by waves of outsiders", including German, Italian, and Spanish migrants. She found however that the style and language were turgid and indigestible, and that parts that should have been fascinating were "served up unappetisingly." Times Higher Education wrote of the same book that Panayi avoided the trap of over-easy ethnic generalisation, and concluded that "If Panayi has an agenda, it is to wake up ignorant Brits, to make them realise how central immigrants have been to the development of the UK's economy and culture in the last century and a half."

The English Historical Review described An Immigration History of Britain as an excellent synthesis of scholarship on immigrants' experiences.

== Awards and distinctions ==
Panayi has been an Alexander von Humboldt fellow at the University of Osnabrück at times between 1991 and 2014. He is a fellow of the Royal Historical Society.

== Books ==
=== Immigration ===
- Enemy in Our Midst: Germans in Britain During the First World War, 1991
- Immigration, ethnicity and racism in Britain 1815-1945, 1994
- German Immigrants in Britain During the 19th Century, 1815-1914, 1995
- Outsiders: History of European Minorities, 1998
- An Ethnic History of Europe since 1945: Nations, States and Minorities, 1999
- Ethnic Minorities in 19th and 20th Century Germany: Jews, Gypsies, Poles, Turks and Others, 2000
- Germans in Britain since 1500 (essays edited by Panikos Panayi), 2003
- Prisoners of Britain: German Civilian and Combatant Internees During the First World War, 2014
- An Immigration History of Britain: Multicultural Racism since 1800, 2014
- The Germans in India: Elite European migrants in the British Empire, 2017
- Migrant City: A New History of London, 2020

=== Food ===
- Spicing Up Britain: The Multicultural History of British Food, 2010
- Fish and Chips: A History, 2014
