= English cuisine =

Culinary traditions of England

Internationally recognised: afternoon tea in traditional English style in Philadelphia, Pennsylvania

English cuisine encompasses the cooking styles, traditions and recipes associated with England. It has distinctive attributes of its own, but is also very similar to wider British cuisine, partly historically and partly due to the import of ingredients and ideas from the Americas, China, and India during the time of the British Empire and as a result of post-war immigration.

Some traditional meals, such as bread and cheese, roasted and stewed meats, meat and game pies, boiled vegetables and broths with herbs or spices, and freshwater and saltwater fish have ancient origins. The 14th-century English cookbook, the Forme of Cury, (Note: Cury here means cooking, related to French cuire, to cook. It is unrelated to curry.) contains recipes for these, and dates from the royal court of Richard II.

English cooking has been influenced by foreign ingredients and cooking styles since the Middle Ages. Curry was introduced from the Indian subcontinent and adapted to English tastes from the eighteenth century with Hannah Glasse's recipe for chicken "currey". French cuisine influenced English recipes throughout the Victorian era. After the rationing of the Second World War, Elizabeth David's 1950 A Book of Mediterranean Food had wide influence, bringing the cuisines of that region, including of Italy, to English homes. Her success encouraged other cookery writers to describe other styles, including Chinese and Thai cuisine. England continues to absorb culinary ideas from all over the world.

== History ==
=== Middle Ages ===
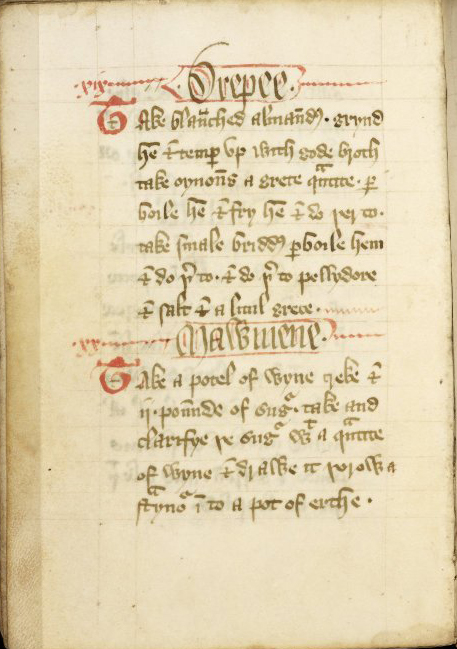
Recipes from The Forme of Cury for "drepee", parboiled birds with almonds and fried onions, and "mawmenee", a sweet stew of capon or pheasant with cinnamon, ginger, cloves, dates, and pine nuts, coloured with sandalwood, c.1390

English cooking has developed over many centuries since at least the time of The Forme of Cury, written in the Middle Ages around 1390 in the reign of King Richard II. The book offers imaginative and sophisticated recipes using seasonings including nutmeg, ginger, cinnamon, cardamon, and cloves, with spicy sweet and sour sauces thickened with bread or quantities of almonds boiled, peeled, dried, and ground, and often served in pastry. Foods such as gingerbread are described. It was not at all, emphasises Clarissa Dickson Wright in her A History of English Food, a matter of large lumps of roast meat at every meal as imagined in Hollywood films.

Instead, medieval dishes often had the texture of a purée, possibly containing small fragments of meat or fish: 48% of the recipes in the Beinecke manuscript are for dishes similar to stews or purées. Such dishes could be broadly of three types: somewhat acidic, with wine, vinegar, and spices in the sauce, thickened with bread; sweet and sour, with sugar and vinegar; and sweet, using then-expensive sugar. An example of such a sweet purée dish for meat (it could also be made with fish) from the Beinecke manuscript is the rich, saffron-yellow "mortruys", thickened with egg:

Take brawn of capons & porke, sodyn & groundyn; tempyr hit up with milk of almondes drawn with the broth. Set hit on the fyre; put to sigure & safron. When hit boyleth, tak som of thy milk, boylying, fro the fyre & aley hit up with yolkes of eyron that hit be ryght chargeaunt; styre hit wel for quelling. Put therto that othyr, & ster hem togedyr, & serve hem forth as mortruys; and strew on poudr of gynger.

Another manuscript, Utilis Coquinario, mentions dishes such as "pyany", poultry garnished with peonies; "hyppee", a rose-hip broth; and birds such as cormorants and woodcocks.

=== Sixteenth century ===
The early modern period saw the gradual arrival of printed cookery books, though the first, the printer Richard Pynson's 1500 Boke of Cokery was compiled from medieval texts. The next, A Proper Newe Booke of Cokerye, was published sometime after 1545. The Secretes of the Reverende Maister Alexis of Piermont was published in 1558, translated from a French translation of Alessio Piemontese's original Italian work on confectionery. The number of titles expanded rapidly towards the end of the century to include Thomas Dawson's The Good Huswifes Jewell in 1585, the Book of Cookrye by "A. W." in 1591, and John Partridge's The Good Hous-wives Handmaide in 1594. These books were of two kinds: collections of so-called secrets on confectionery and health remedies, aimed at aristocratic ladies; and advice on cookery and how to manage a household, aimed at women from more ordinary backgrounds, most likely wives of minor aristocrats, clergymen, and professional men. (Note: Early modern professionals included doctors and lawyers.)

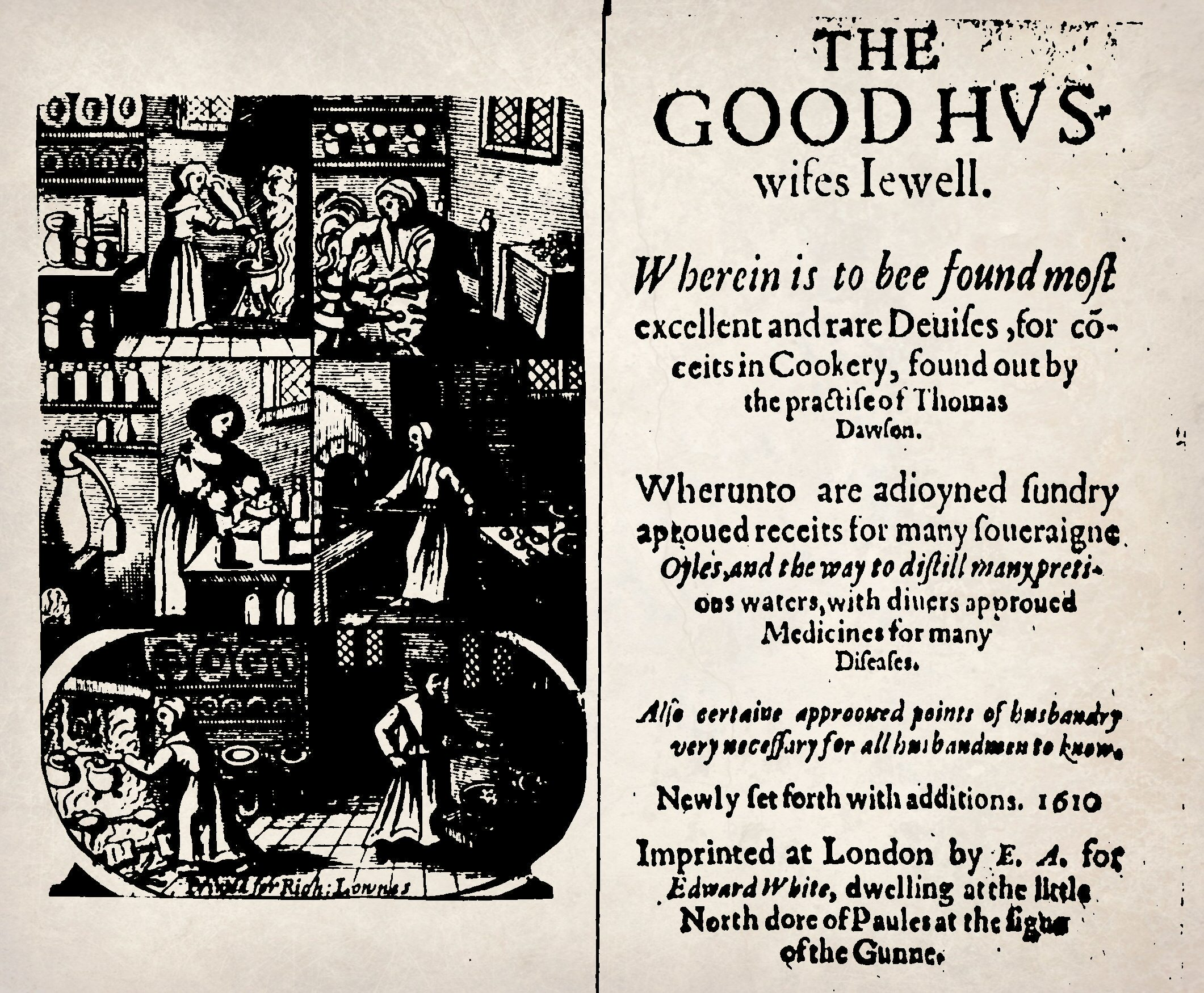
Thomas Dawson's The Good Huswifes Jewell was first published in 1585.

English tastes evolved during the sixteenth century in at least three ways. First, recipes emphasise a balance of sweet and sour. Second, butter becomes an important ingredient in sauces, a trend which continued in later centuries. Third, herbs, which could be grown locally but had been little used in the Middle Ages, started to replace spices as flavourings. In A. W.'s Book of Cookrye, 35% of the recipes for meat stews and sauces include herbs, most commonly thyme. On the other hand, 76% of those meat recipes still used the distinctly mediaeval combination of sugar and dried fruit, together or separately. New ingredients were arriving from distant countries, too: The Good Huswifes Jewell introduced sweet potatoes (from the tropical Americas) alongside familiar medieval recipes.

Elinor Fettiplace's Receipt Book, compiled in 1604 (and first published in 1986) gives an intimate view of Elizabethan cookery. The book provides recipes for various forms of bread, such as buttered loaves; for apple fritters; preserves and pickles; and a celebration cake for 100 people. New ingredients appear; a recipe for dressing a shoulder of mutton calls for the use of the newly available citrus fruits:

Take a showlder of mutton and being halfe Roasted, Cut it in great slices and save the gravie then take Clarret wine and sinamond & sugar with a little Cloves and mace beatne and the peel of an oringe Cut thin and minced very smale. Put the mutton the gravie and these thinges together and boyle yt between two dishes, wringe the juice of an oringe into yt as yt boyleth, when yt is boyled enough lay the bone of the mutton beinge first Broyled in the dish with it then Cut slices of limonds and lay on the mutton and so serve yt in.

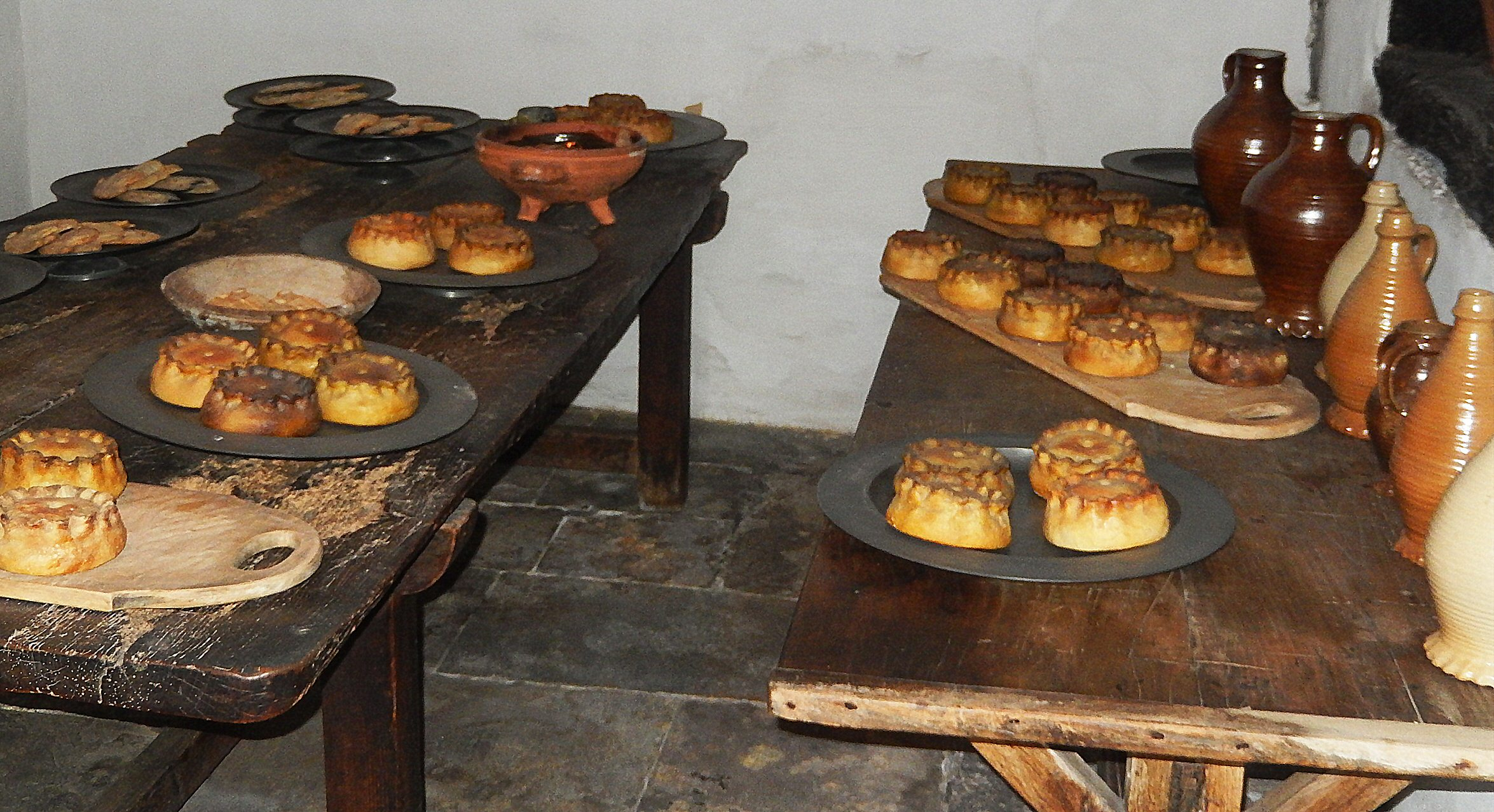
Pies have been an important part of English cooking from Tudor times to the present day.

Pies were important both as food and for show; the nursery rhyme "Sing a Song of Sixpence", with its lines "Four and Twenty blackbirds / Baked in a pie. // When the pie was opened, The birds began to sing" refers to the conceit of placing live birds under a pie crust just before serving at a banquet.

=== Seventeenth century ===
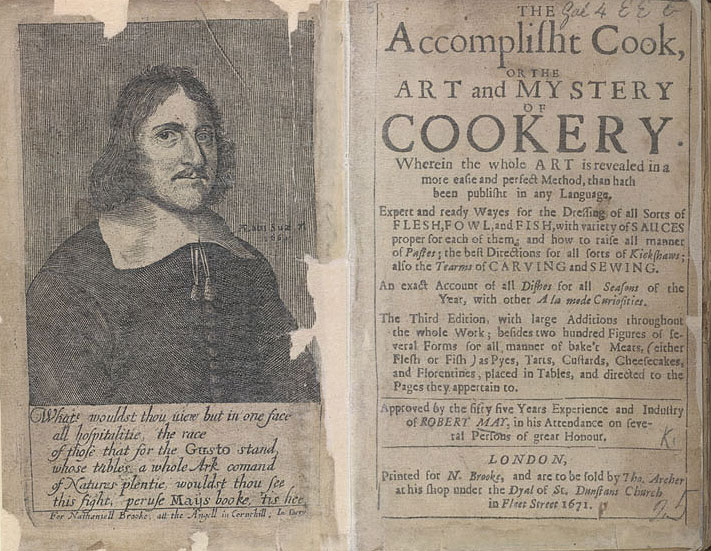
Robert May's The Accomplisht Cook, first published in 1660

The bestselling cookery book of the early seventeenth century was Gervase Markham's The English Huswife, published in 1615. It appears that his recipes were from the collection of a deceased noblewoman, and therefore dated back to Elizabethan times or earlier. Women were thus becoming both the authors of cookery books and their readers, though only about 10% of women in England were literate by 1640. Markham's recipes are distinctively different from medieval ones; three quarters of his sauces for meat and meat pies make use of a combination of sweet and sour, and he advises:

When a broth is too sweet, to sharpen it with verjuice, when too tart to sweet it with sugar, when flat and wallowish to quicken it with orenge and lemmons, and when too bitter to make it pleasant with hearbes and spices.

Robert May's The Accomplisht Cook was published in 1660 when he was 72 years old. The book included a substantial number of recipes for soups and stews, 38 recipes for sturgeon, and a large number of pies variously containing fish (including sturgeon), meat (including battalia pie), and sweet fillings.

French influence is evident in Hannah Woolley's The Cooks Guide, 1664. Her recipes are designed to enable her non-aristocratic readers to imitate the fashionable French style of cooking with elaborate sauces. She combined the use of "Claret wine" and anchovies with more traditional cooking ingredients such as sugar, dried fruit, and vinegar.

In 1699, John Evelyn published Acetaria: A Discourse of Sallets, considered to be the first book on salads. It explores the philosophical significance of salads, reflecting 17th-century beliefs that spiritual purity could be regained through knowledge of nature.

=== Eighteenth century ===
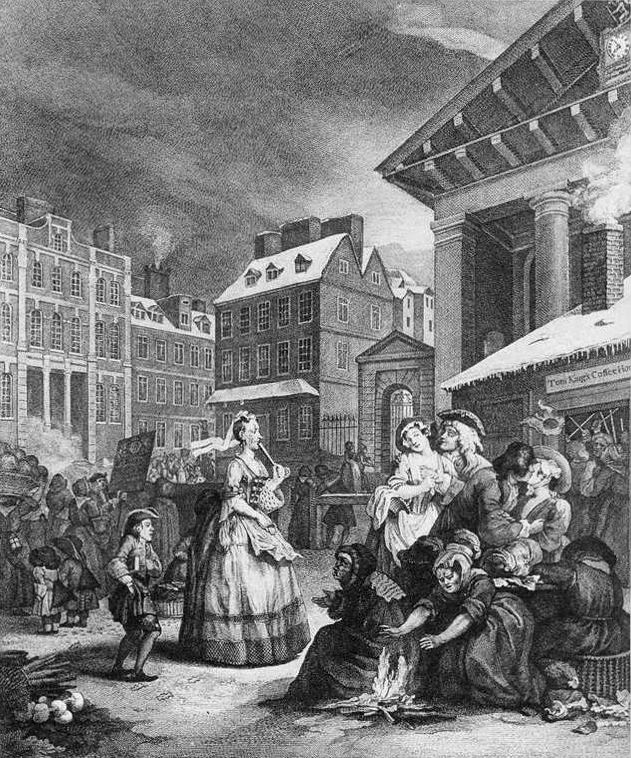
Tom King's Coffee House in William Hogarth's painting Four Times of the Day, 1738

John Nott's The Cooks and Confectioners Dictionary (1723), still with rather few precedents to go by, chose an alphabetical treatment for its recipes, from Ale to Zest. The book covered everything from soups and salads to meat and fish, as well as pastries of many kinds, confectionery, and the making of beer, cider, and wine. Bills of fare are given for each month of the year.

The anonymously published Primitive Cookery promoted economical lacto-vegetarian dishes, though some recipes included meat.

James Woodforde's Diary of a Country Parson gives a good idea of the sort of food eaten in England in the eighteenth century by those who were reasonably prosperous. To welcome some neighbours on 8 June 1781, he gave them for dinner:

a Couple of Chicken boiled and a Tongue, a Leg of Mutton boiled and Capers and Batter Pudding for the first Course, Second, a couple of Ducks rosted and green Peas, some Artichokes, Tarts and Blancmange. After dinner, Almonds and Raisins, Oranges and Strawberries, Mountain and Port Wines. Peas and Strawberries the first gathered this year by me. We spent a very agreeable day.

Another country clergyman, Gilbert White, in The Natural History of Selborne (1789) recorded the increased consumption of vegetables by ordinary country people in the south of England, to which, he noted, potatoes, from the Americas, had only been added during the reign of King George III:

Green-stalls in cities now support multitudes in comfortable state, while gardeners get fortunes. Every decent labourer also has his garden, which is half his support; and common farmers provide plenty of beans, peas, and greens, for their hinds to eat with their bacon.

Hannah Glasse's The Art of Cookery made Plain and Easy was the best-selling cookery book for a century from its publication in 1747. It ran to at least 40 editions, and was widely pirated.

=== Nineteenth century ===
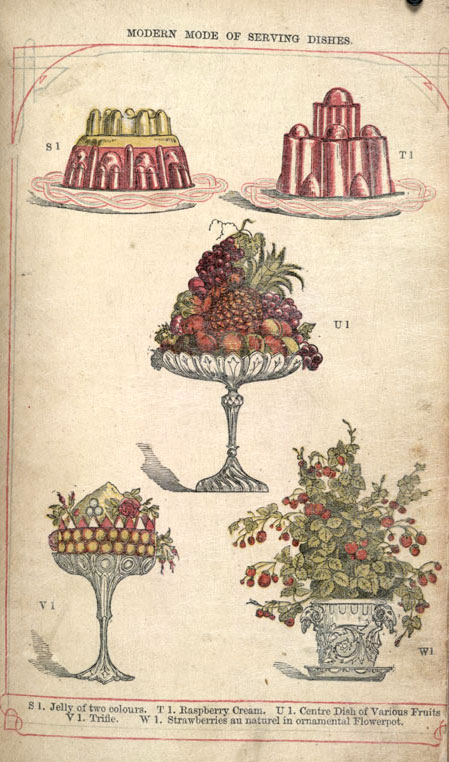
How English puddings should look, according to Mrs Beeton's Book of Household Management, 1861

English cooking was systematised and made available to the middle classes by a series of popular books, their authors becoming household names. One of the first was Mrs Rundell's A New System of Domestic Cookery, 1806; it went through sixty-seven editions by 1844, selling hundreds of thousands of copies in Britain and America. This was followed by Eliza Acton's Modern Cookery for Private Families 1845, which Bee Wilson has called "the greatest cookery book in our language", but "modern" only in a nineteenth-century sense.

An example recipe from Acton's Modern Cookery for Private Families is her "Quince Blanc-Mange (Delicious)":

Dissolve in a pint of prepared juice of quinces an ounce of the best isinglass; next, add ten ounces of sugar, roughly pounded, and stir these together over a clear fire, from twenty to thirty minutes, or until the juice jellies in falling from the spoon. Remove the scum carefully, and pour the boiling jelly gradually to half a pint of thick cream, stirring them briskly together as they are mixed: they must be stirred until very nearly cold, and then poured into a mould which has been rubbed in every part with the smallest possible quantity of very pure salad oil, or if more convenient, into one that has been dipped into cold water.

Acton was supplanted by the most famous English cookery book of the Victorian era, Isabella Beeton's Mrs Beeton's Book of Household Management, 1861, which sold nearly two million copies up to 1868. Where Acton's was a book to be read and enjoyed, Beeton's, substantially written in later editions by other hands, was a manual of instructions and recipes, to be looked up as needed. Mrs Beeton was substantially plagiarised from authors including Elizabeth Raffald and Acton. The Anglo-Italian cook Charles Elmé Francatelli became a celebrity, cooking for a series of aristocrats, London clubs, and royalty including Queen Victoria. His 1846 book The Modern Cook ran through 29 editions by 1896, popularising an elaborate cuisine described throughout with French terminology, and offering bills of fare for up to 300 people.

Three of the major hot drinks popular in England, tea, coffee, and chocolate, originated from outside Europe and were already staple items by Victorian times. Catherine of Braganza brought the Portuguese habit of tea to England around 1660. Initially, its expense restricted it to wealthy consumers, but the price gradually dropped, until by the 19th century its use was widespread. Introduced in the 16th century, coffee became popular by the 17th century, especially in the coffee houses, the first opening in Oxford in 1650. Hot chocolate was a popular drink by the 17th century, long before it was used as a food. Chocolate bars were developed and marketed by three English Quaker-founded businesses, Joseph Fry's (1847), Rowntree's (1862), and Cadbury's (1868).

=== Twentieth century ===
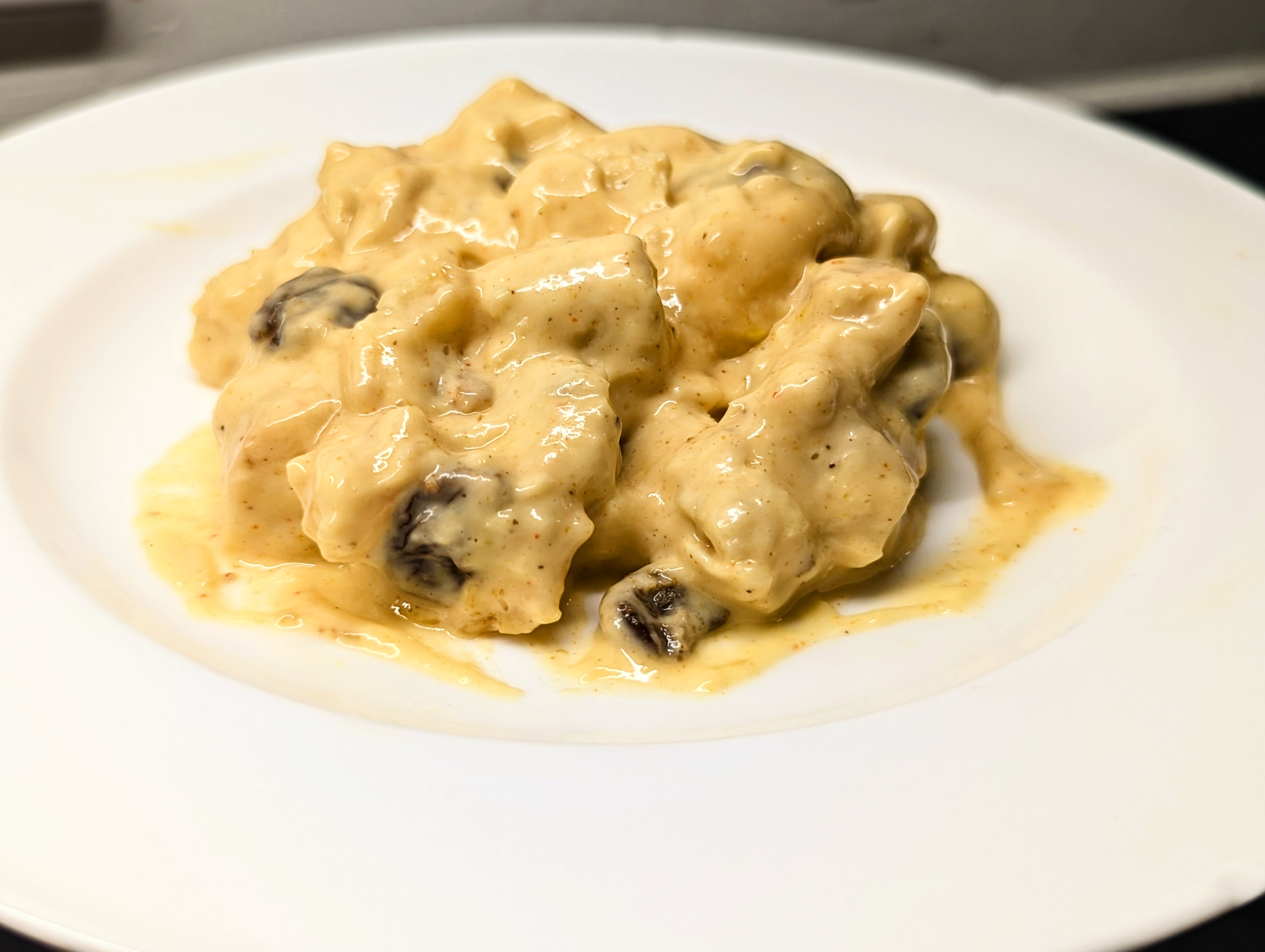
Coronation chicken (1953) made with mayonnaise, sultanas, and curry powder

After the First World War, many new food products became available to the typical household, with branded foods advertised for their convenience. Kitchen servants with time to make custards and puddings were replaced with instant foods in jars, or powders that the housewife could quickly mix. American-style dry cereals began to challenge the porridge and bacon and eggs of the middle classes, and the bread and margarine of the poor. While wartime shipping shortages had sharply narrowed choice, the 1920s saw many new kinds of fruit imported from around the world, along with better quality, packaging, and hygiene, aided by refrigerators and refrigerated ships. Authors in the 1930s such as Lady Sysonby drew on recipes from a wide range of countries.

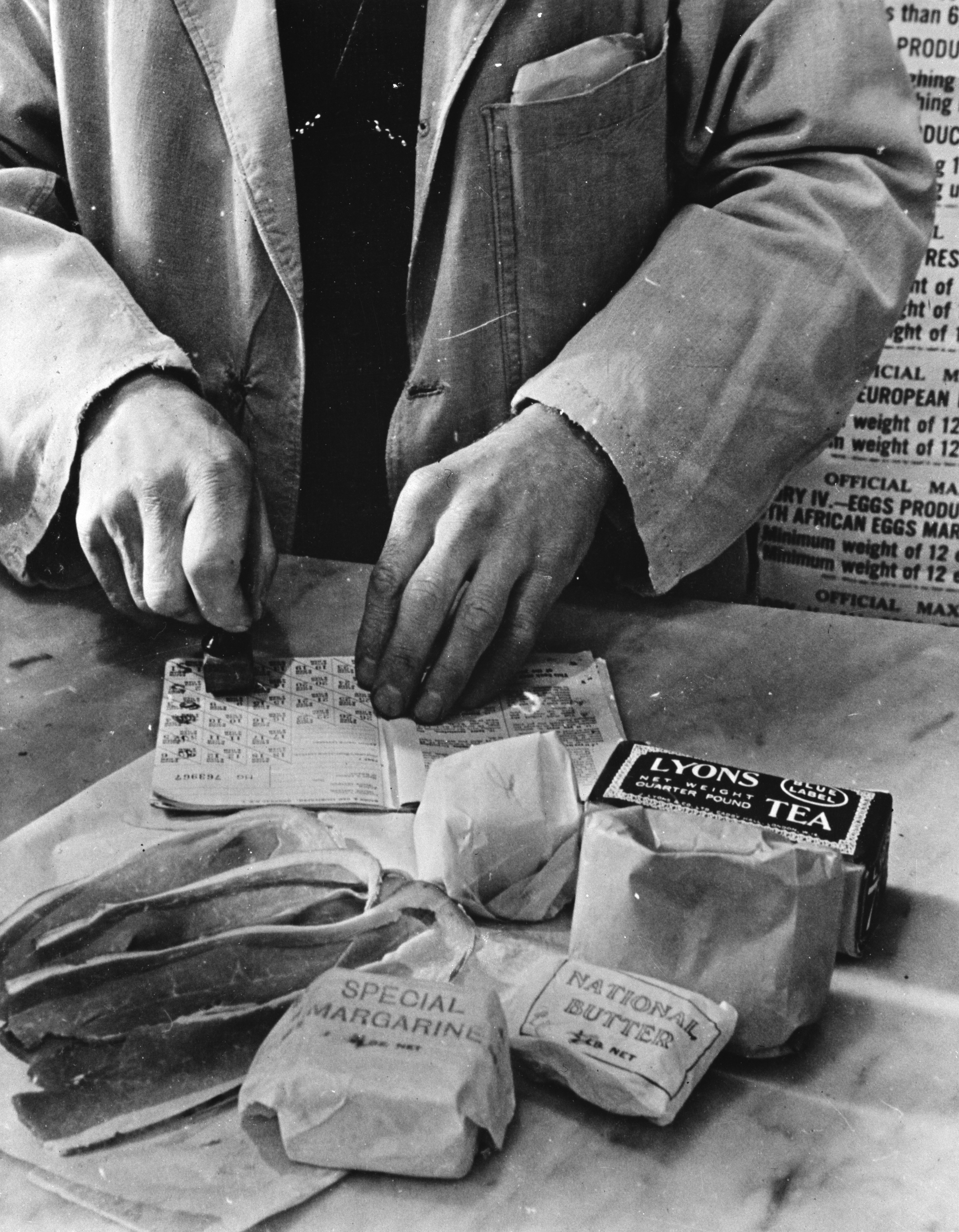
Issuing a family's weekly rations of bacon, margarine, butter, sugar, tea, and lard in 1943

Rationing was introduced in 1940 to cope with the shortages caused by the wartime blockade. Foods such as bananas and chocolate became hard to find, while unfamiliar items such as dried egg, dried potato, whale meat, snook (a South African fish), and the tinned pork product Spam appeared in the national diet. Since butter, sugar, eggs and flour were all rationed, English dishes such as pies and cakes became hard to make from traditional recipes. Instead, foods such as carrots were used in many different dishes, their natural sugars providing sweetness in novel dishes like carrot fudge. The diet was less than enjoyable, but paradoxically, rationing meant that overall the population was healthier than ever before, and perhaps ever since. The Ministry of Food employed home economists such as Marguerite Patten to demonstrate how to cook economically. After the war, Patten became one of the first television cooks, and sold 17 million copies of her 170 books.

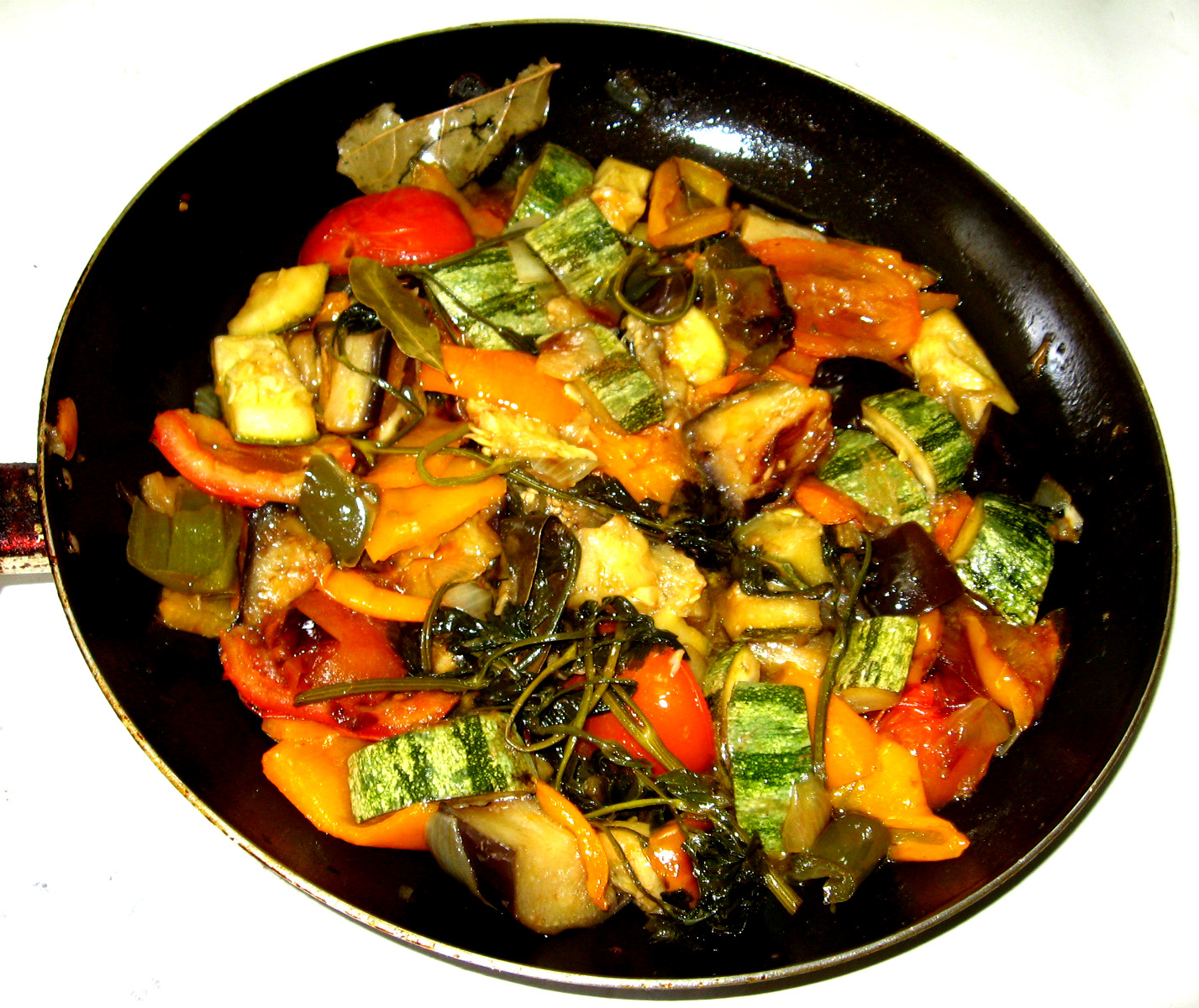
Elizabeth David's 1950 A Book of Mediterranean Food changed English cooking with dishes such as ratatouille.

Elizabeth David profoundly changed English cooking with her 1950 A Book of Mediterranean Food. Written at a time of scarcity, her book began with "perhaps the most evocative and inspirational passage in the history of British cookery writing":

The cooking of the Mediterranean shores, endowed with all the natural resources, the colour and flavour of the South, is a blend of tradition and brilliant improvisation. The Latin genius flashes from the kitchen pans. It is honest cooking too; none of the sham Grand Cuisine of the International Palace Hotel

All five of David's early books remained in print half a century later, and her reputation among cookery writers such as Nigel Slater and Clarissa Dickson Wright was of enormous influence. The historian of food Panikos Panayi suggests that this is because David consciously brought foreign cooking styles into the English kitchen; she did this with fine writing, and with practical experience of living and cooking in the countries which she wrote about. She deliberately destroyed the myths of restaurant cuisine, instead describing the home cooking of Mediterranean countries. Her books paved the way for other cookery writers to use foreign recipes. Post-David celebrity chefs, often ephemeral, included Philip Harben, Fanny Cradock, Graham Kerr ("the galloping gourmet"), and Robert Carrier.

== Stereotypical English dishes ==
In 1953, Britain's first celebrity chef, Philip Harben, published Traditional Dishes of Britain. Its chapter titles simply listed "the stereotypical stalwarts of the British diet", from Cornish pasties, crumpets, and Yorkshire pudding to shortbread, Lancashire hotpot, steak and kidney pudding, jellied eels, clotted cream and fish and chips. Panayi noted that Harben began with contradictions and unsupported claims, naming Britain's supposed reputation for the worst food in the world, but claiming that the country's cooks were technically unmatched and that the repertoire of national dishes was the largest of any country's.

The sociologist Bob Ashley observed in 2004 that while people in Britain might agree that the core national diet consisted of items such as the full English breakfast, roast beef with all the trimmings, tea with scones, and fish and chips, few had ever eaten the canonical English breakfast, lunch and dinner in any single day, and many probably never ate any item from the list at all regularly. In any case, Ashley noted, the national diet changes with time, and cookery books routinely include dishes of foreign origin. He remarked that a National Trust café, whose manager claimed "We're not allowed to do foreign food ... I can't do lasagne or anything like that", in fact served curry, because "seemingly curry is English". Anglo-Indian cuisine has indeed been part of the national diet since the eighteenth century.

Some English dishes are relatively new and can be dated to the century, and sometimes to the year, of their introduction. Thus piccalilli was introduced from India in the 18th century, as recorded by Hannah Glasse who gave a recipe for it in 1758. Conversely, dishes and sauces still considered foreign, such as fish in sweet and sour sauce, have been in English recipe books since the Middle Ages. Other dishes took their present form only gradually, as with the so-called "full English breakfast". Breakfasts of this kind are indeed described in later editions of "Mrs Beeton", but as one of many variations. Thus her list of "Family Breakfasts for a Week in Winter" has for Wednesday something that looks fairly modern: "bread, muffins, butter, brawn, grilled bacon, boiled eggs"; but on other days less modern-looking breakfasts include mince, mutton cutlets, grilled kidneys, baked fresh herrings, and hash of cold game or poultry, while suggestions for "Family Breakfasts for a Week in Summer" included sardine toast, cold tongue, kedgeree and rissoles, and "Guests' Breakfast (Autumn)" included cold pheasant, game pie, and pressed beef.

Familiar English dishes, with dates

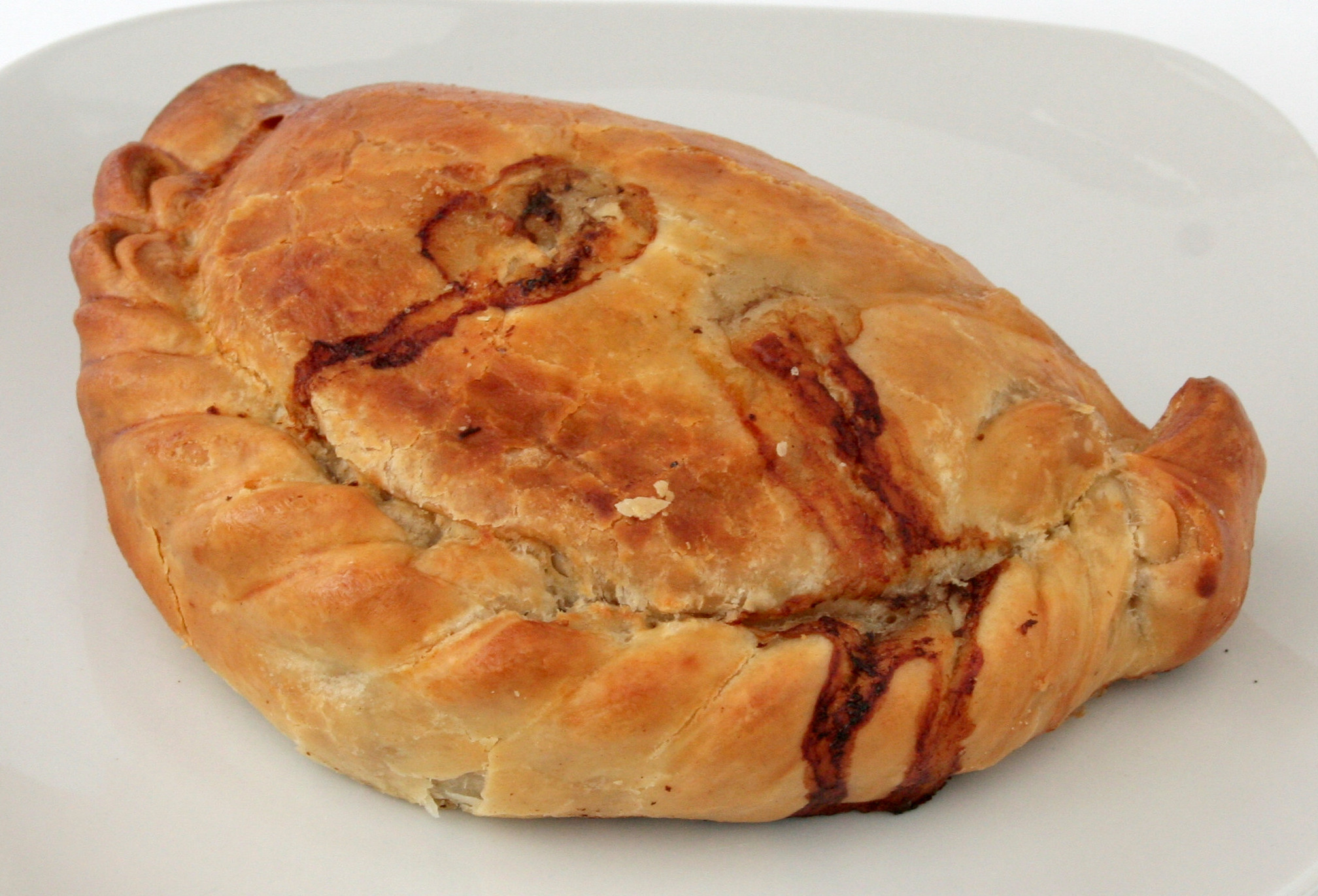
Pasty, particularly Cornish pasties
(13th century)

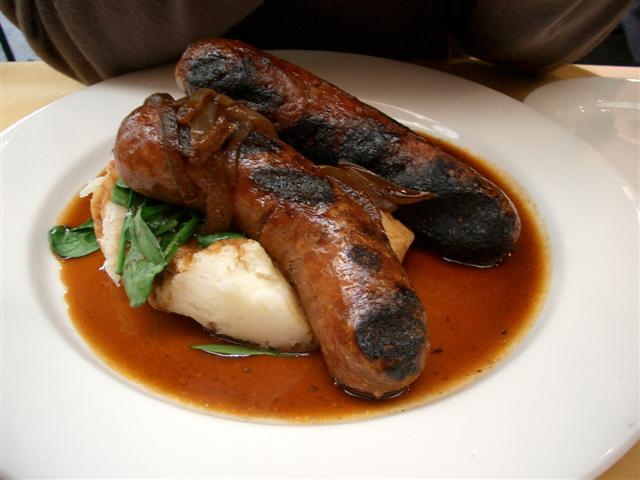
"Bangers and mash": sausages, from Roman times and mashed potato (1588–1593)

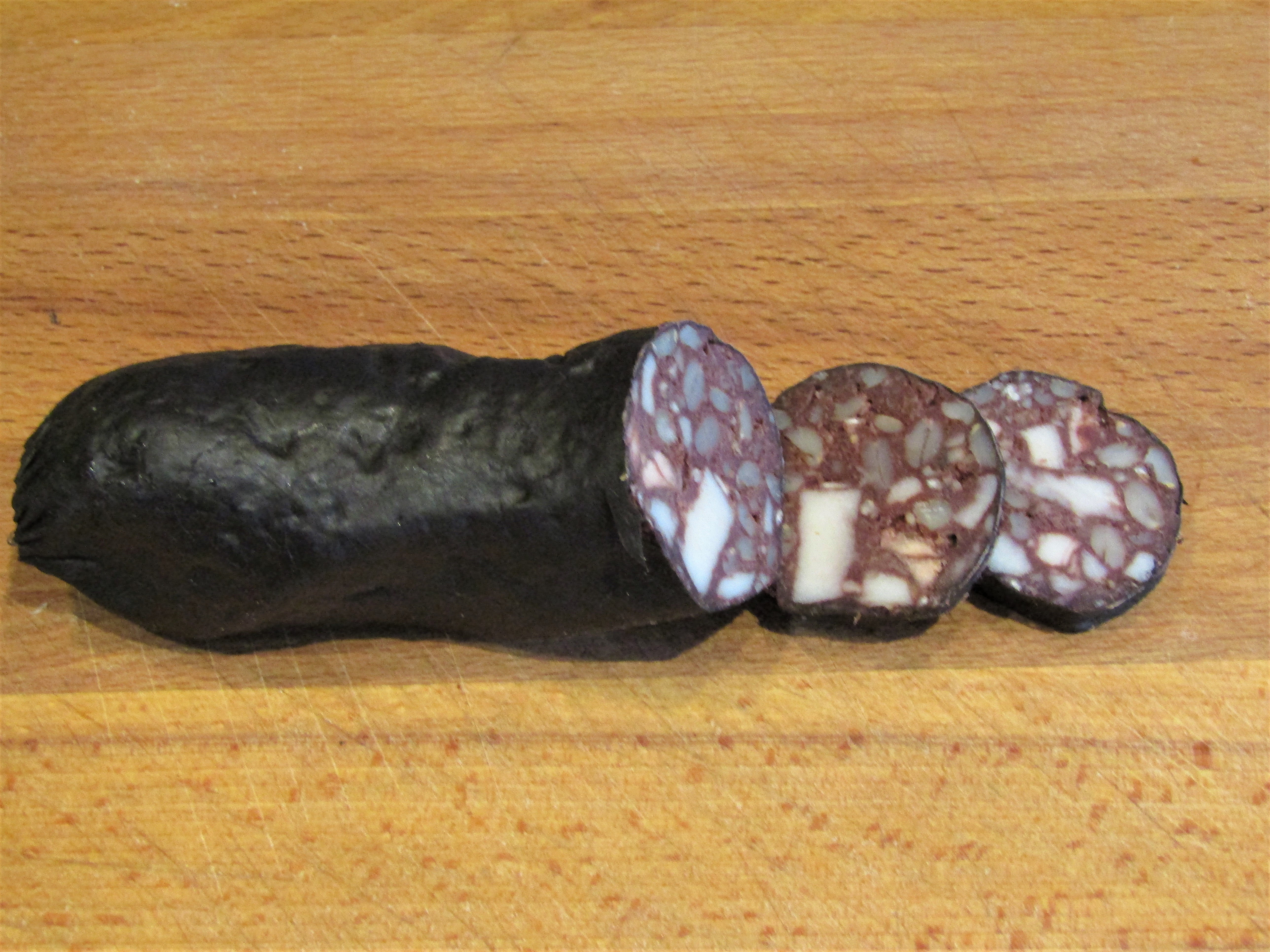
Black pudding, typically part of the "full English breakfast", popular in the Midlands and northern England (pre-15th century)

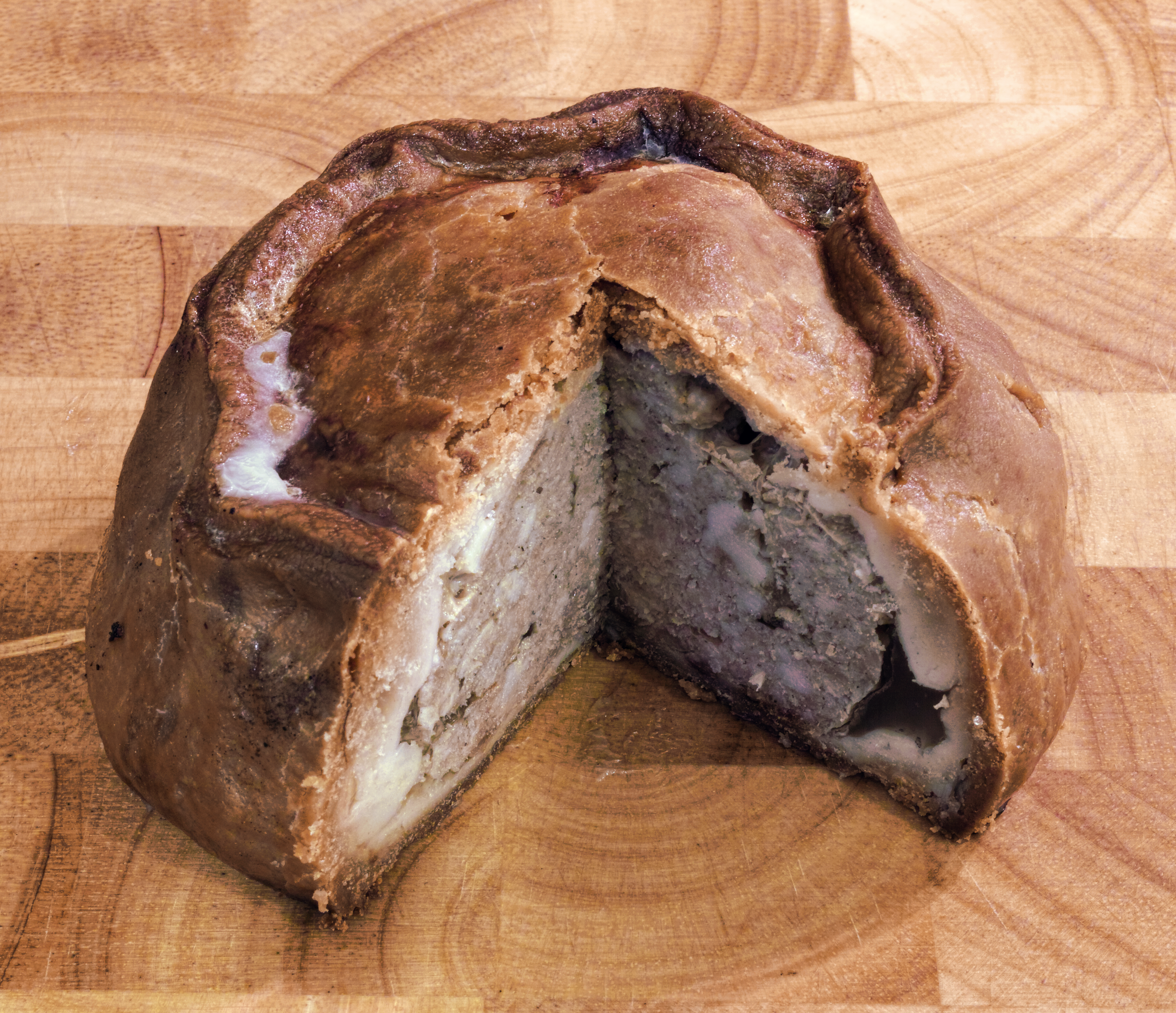
A Melton Mowbray pork pie, by 1780s

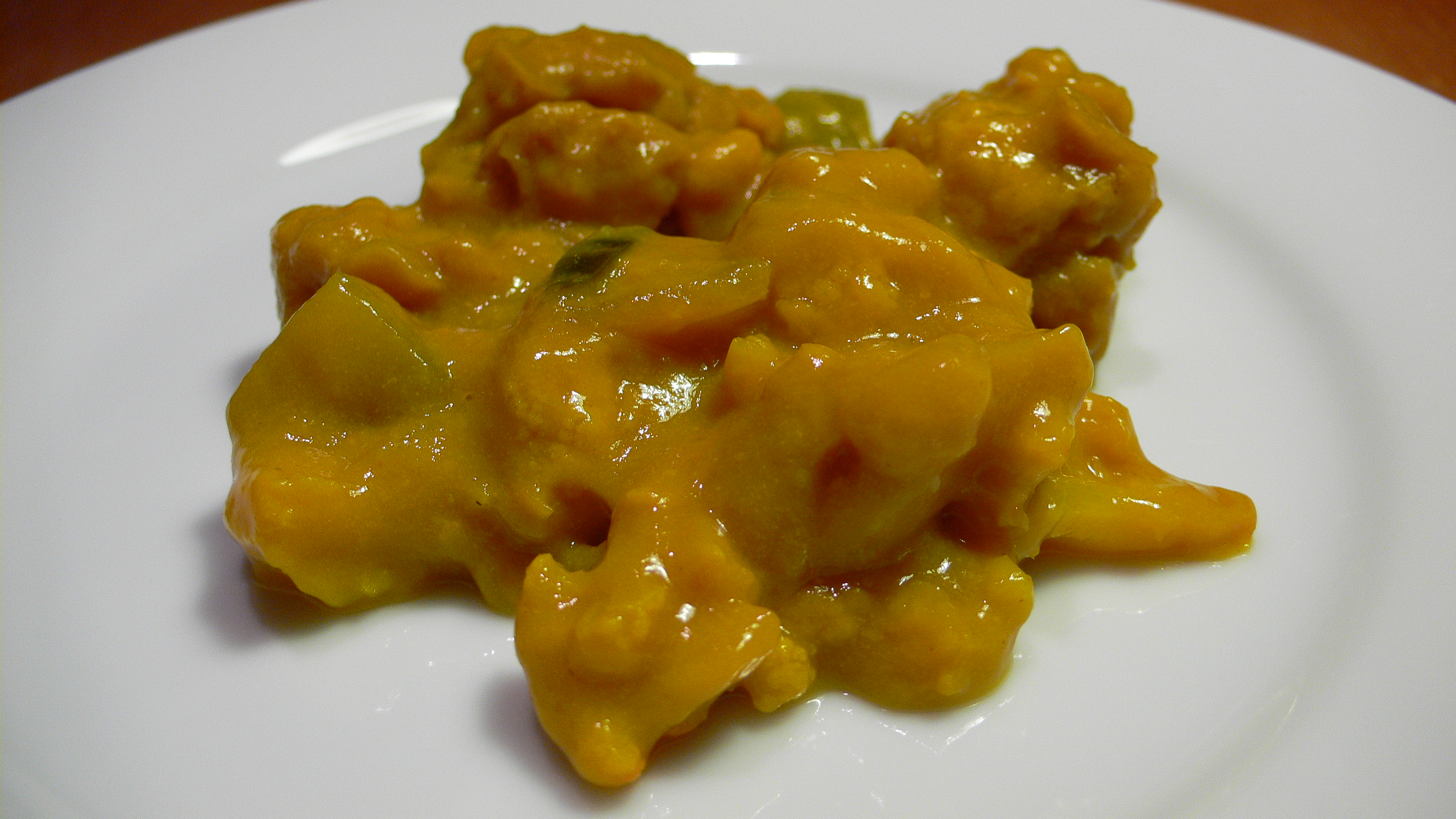
Piccalilli, a pickle derived from Indian cooking by 1758

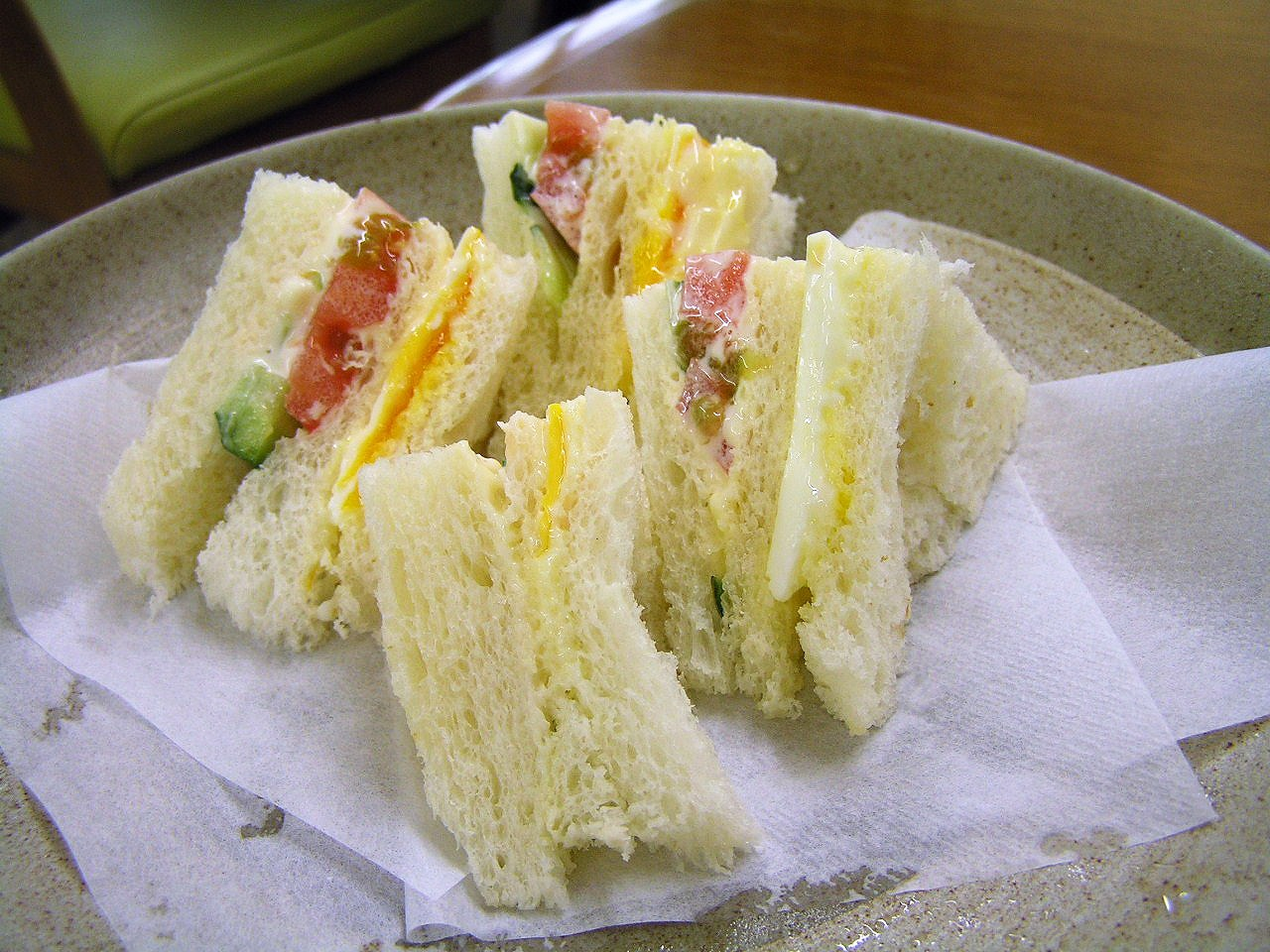
English sandwiches, by 1762

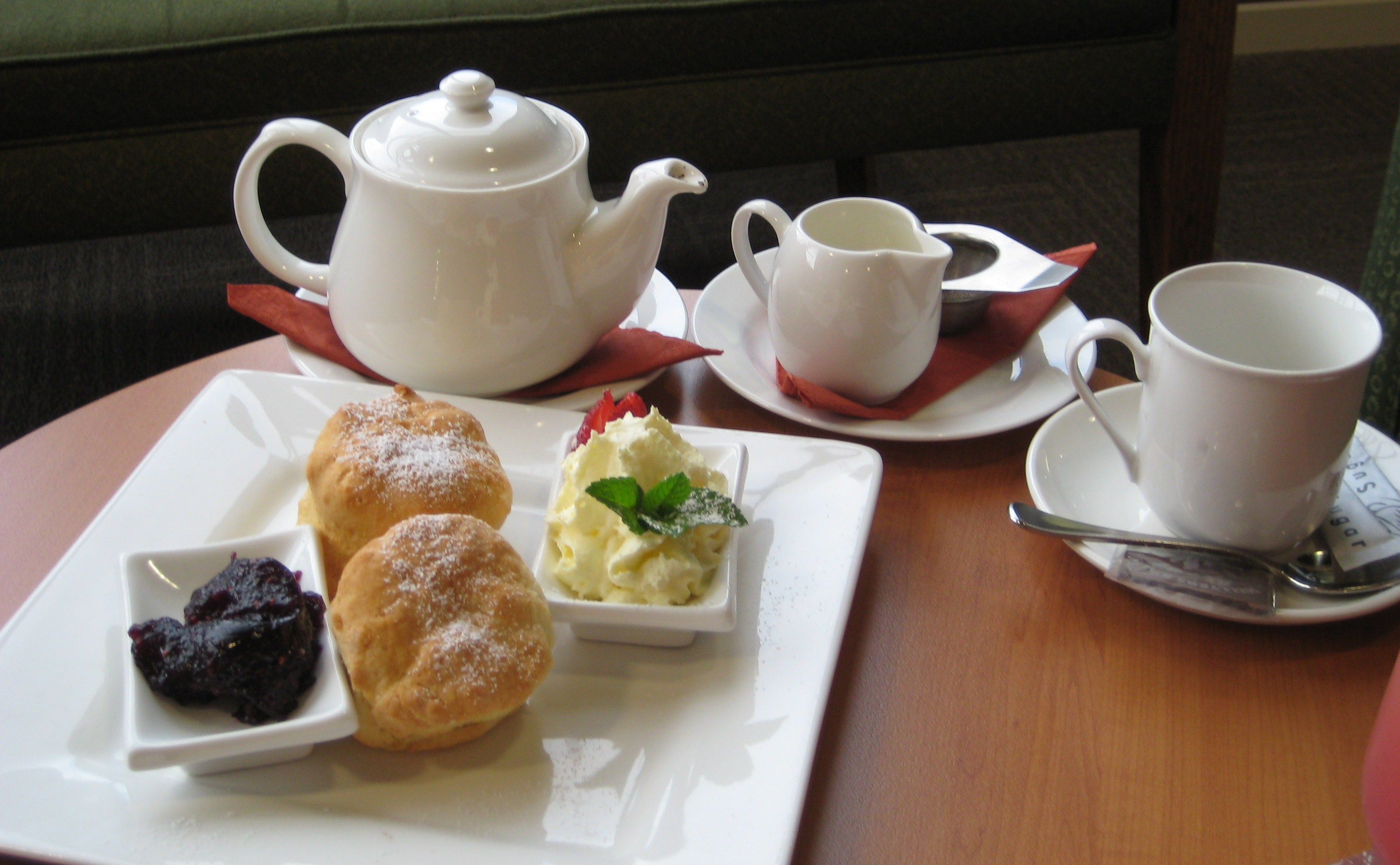
Cream tea: tea (c. 1660), scones (Scots, 16th century), clotted cream, raspberry jam (11th century)

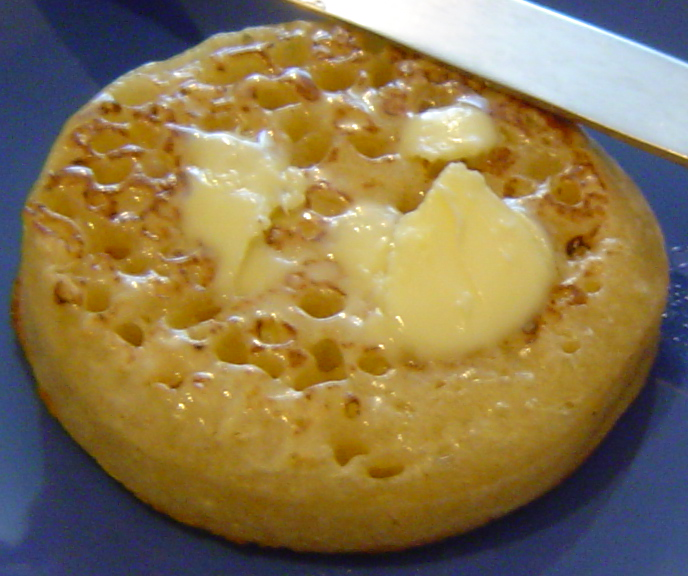
Crumpets (18th century)

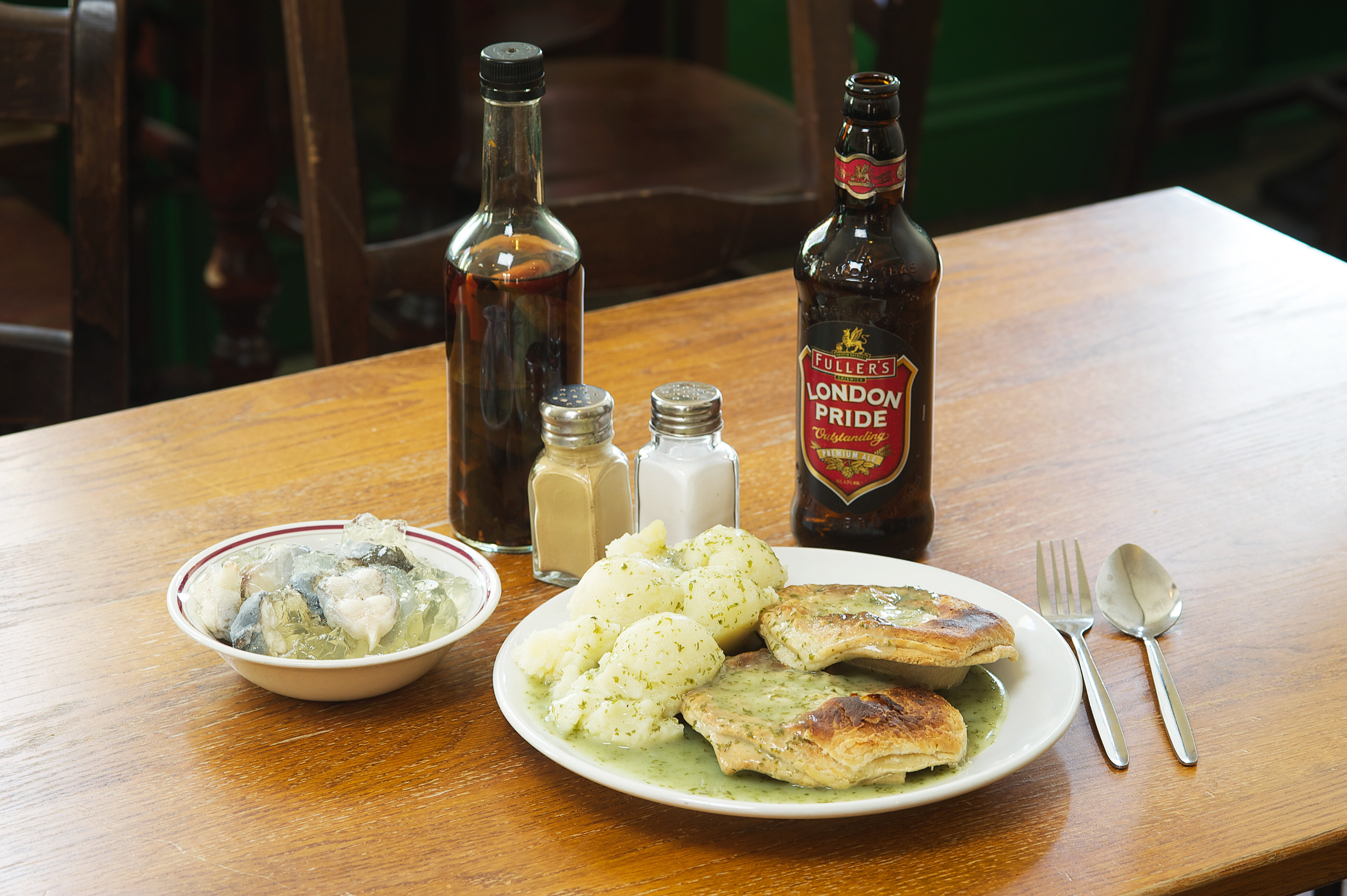
Jellied eels served in "liqour" with "mash", popular in London pie and mash shops (18th century)

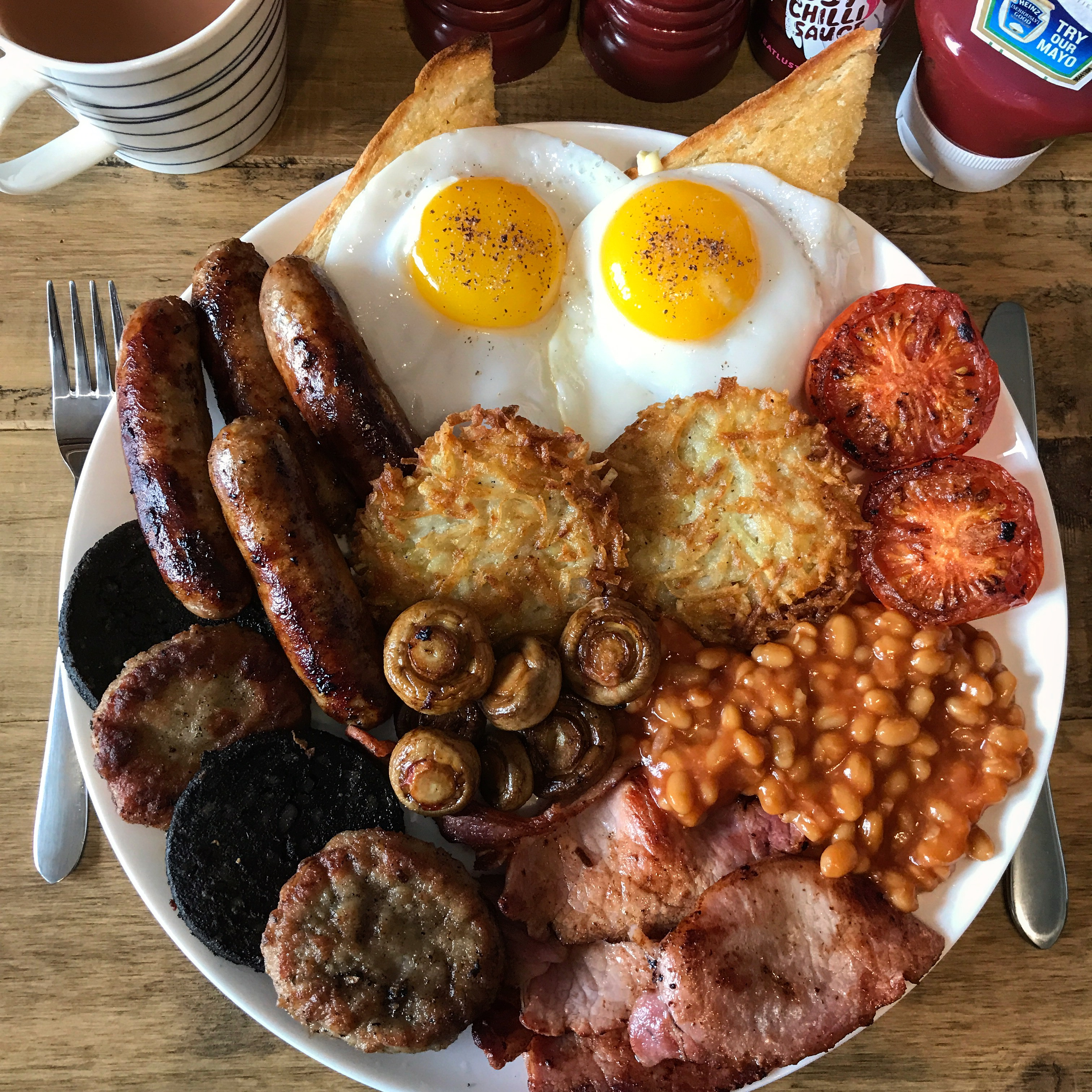
Full English breakfast (19th century) with sausage, bacon, beans and tomatoes (from the Americas, by 18th century) and eggs

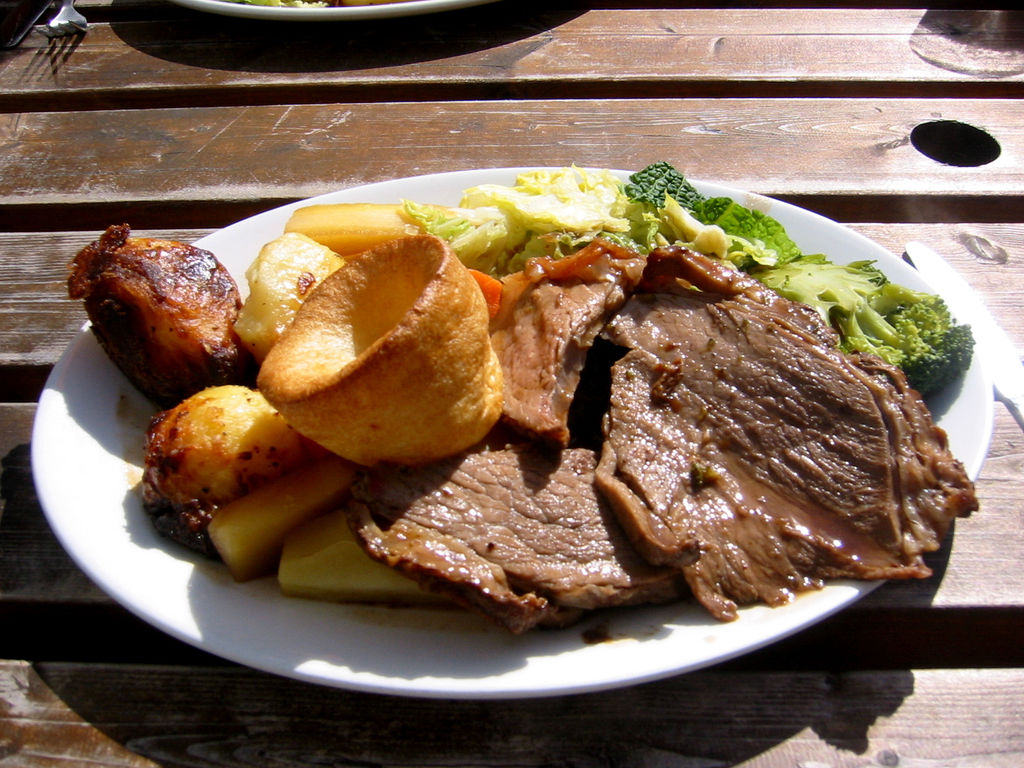
Sunday roast: roast beef (by 18th century), roast potatoes, vegetables and Yorkshire pudding (1747)

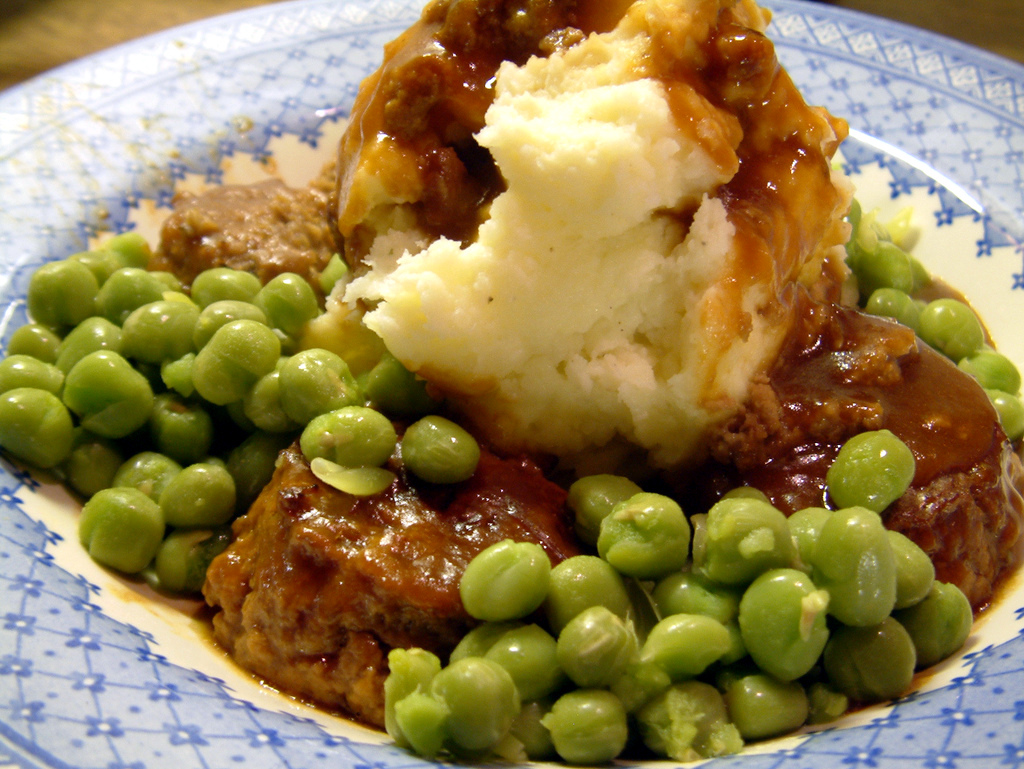
Faggots and peas, popular in the Midlands, especially the Black Country (pre-19th century)

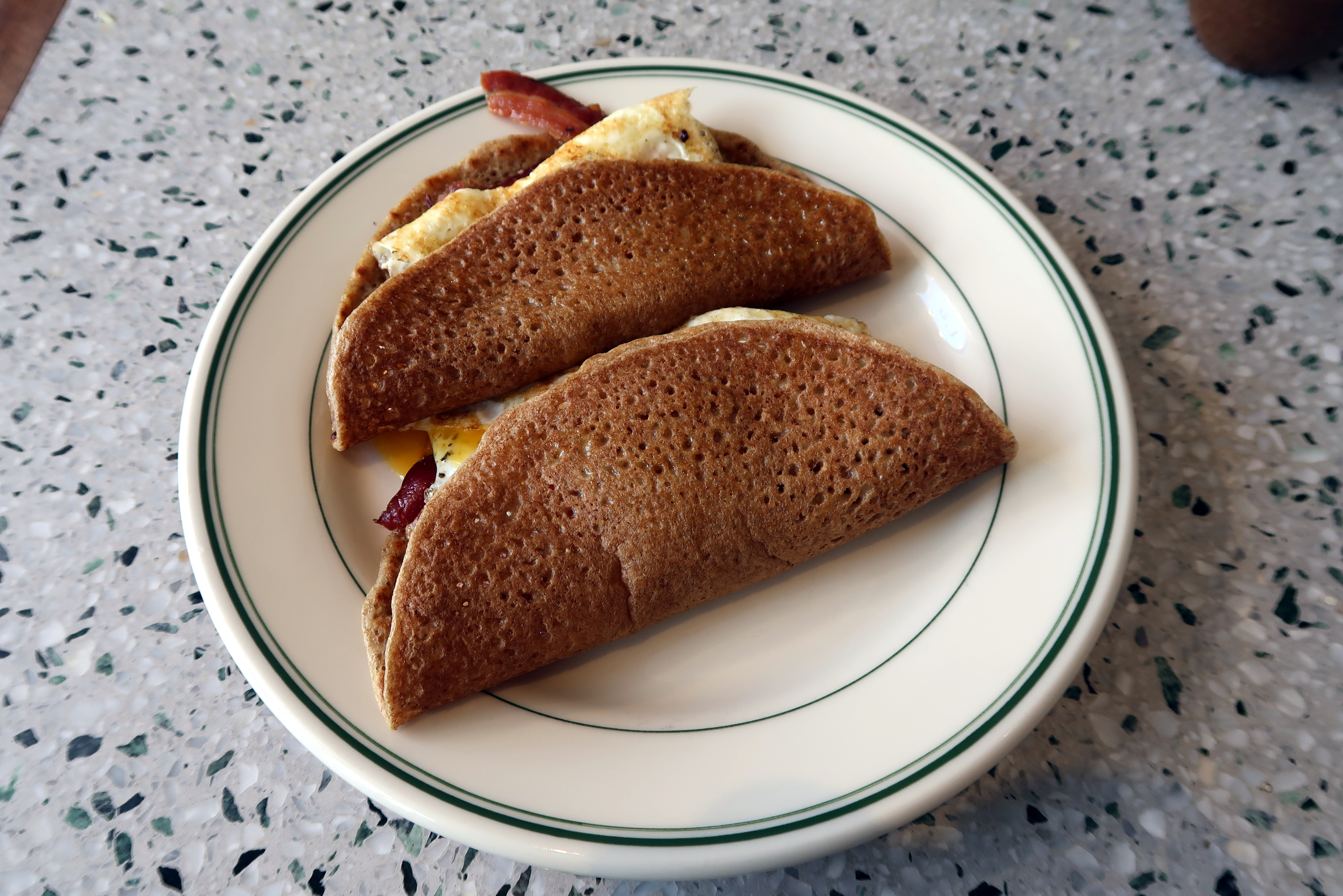
Staffordshire oatcake (19th century)

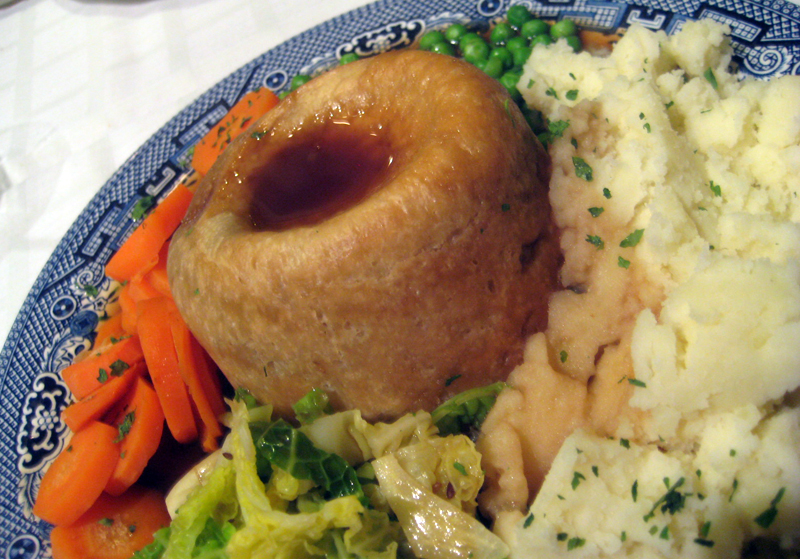
Steak and kidney pudding (1861)

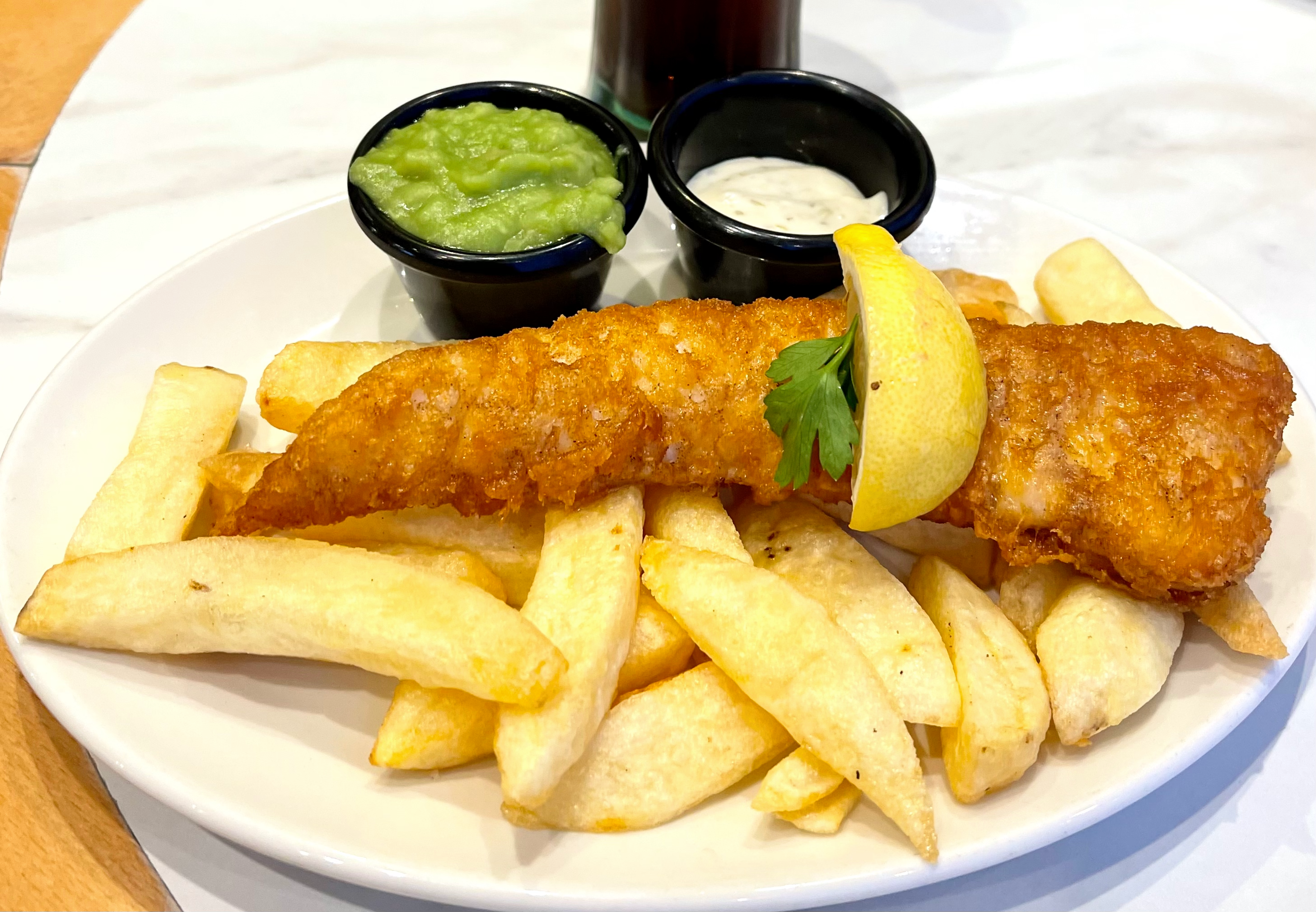
Fish and chips, from c. 1870

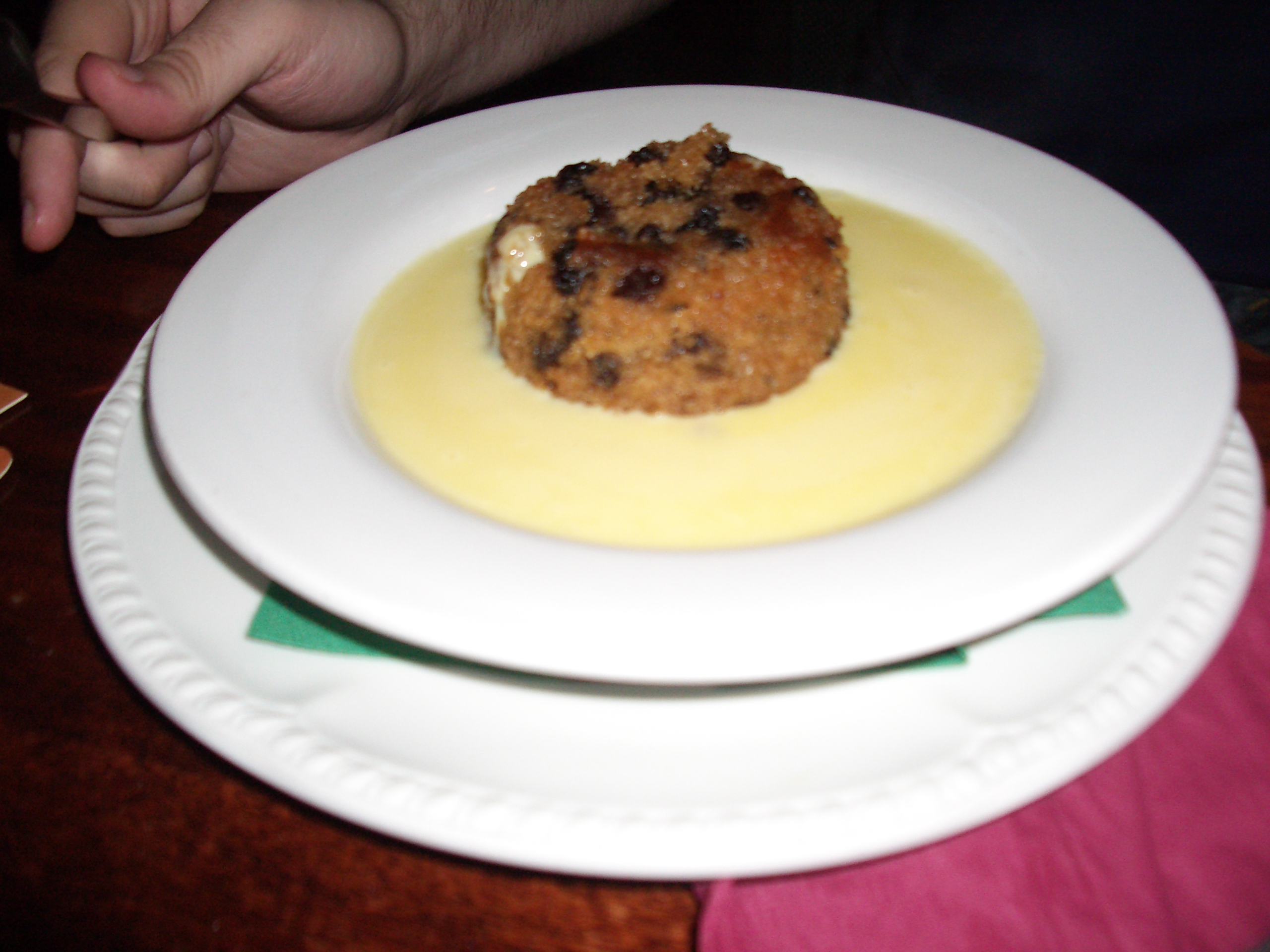
Dessert: Spotted dick (19th century) with custard (Roman, and medieval)

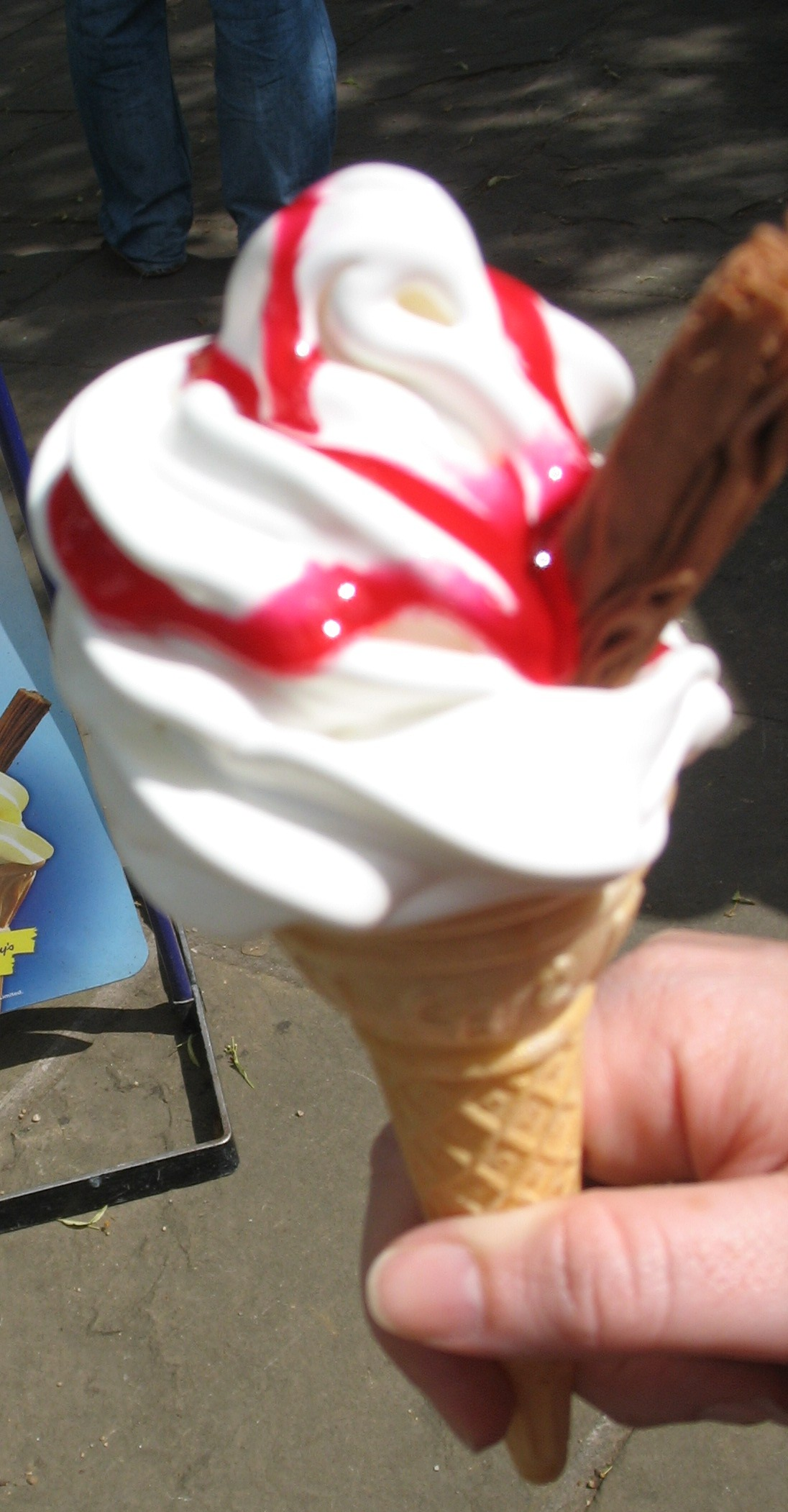
Ice cream cone (1846) (Note: In Charles Elmé Francatelli's The Modern Cook)

== Influences ==
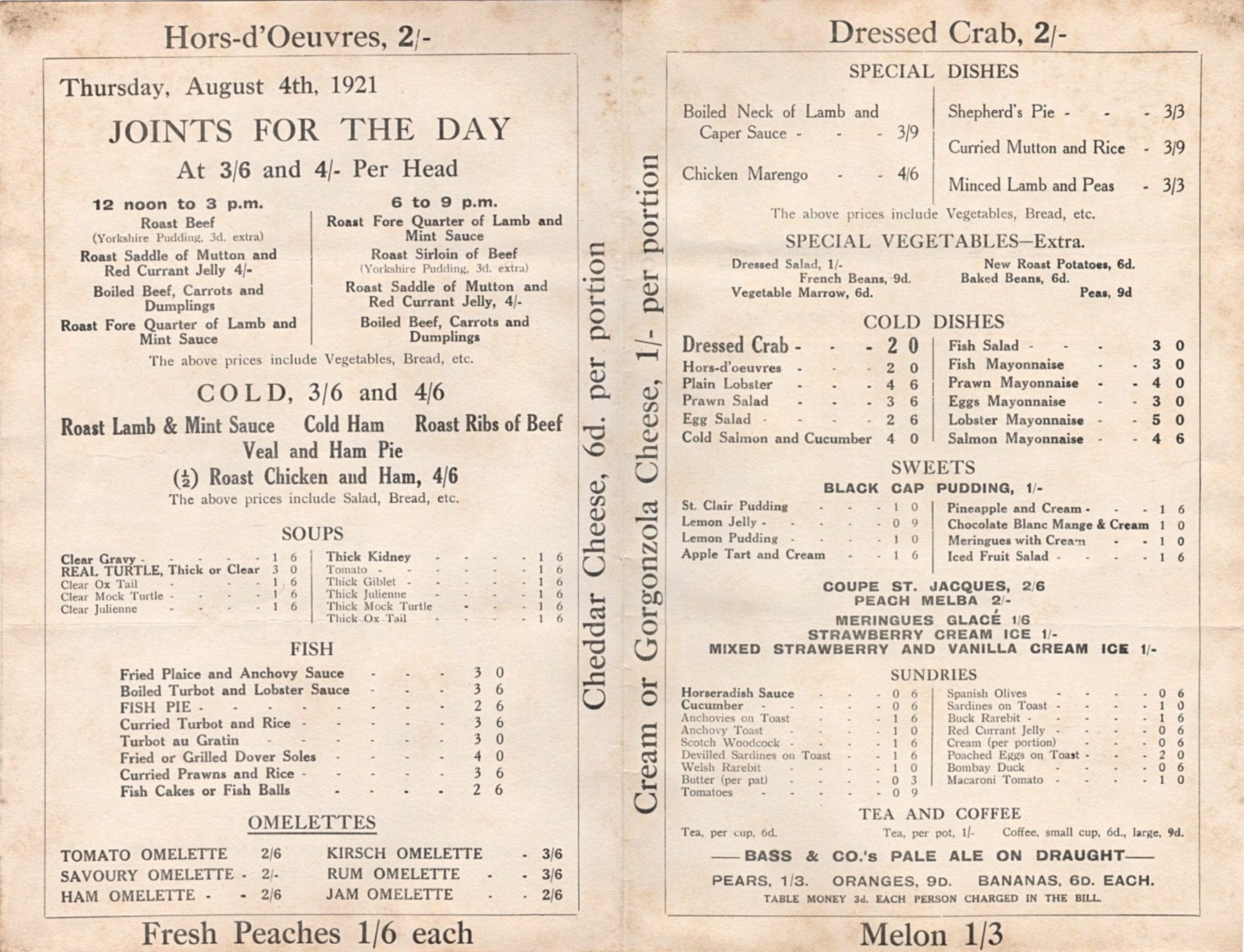
A menu of Simpson's Grand Divan Tavern, London, 1921 showing foreign influences such as hors d'oeuvre, chicken Marengo and Spanish olives

English cookery has demonstrably been open to influences from abroad from as early as the thirteenth century, and in the case of a few foods like sausages from Roman times. The Countess of Leicester, daughter of King John purchased large amounts of cinnamon, while King Edward I ordered large quantities of spices such as pepper and ginger, as well as of what was then an expensive imported luxury, sugar. Dickson Wright refutes the popular idea that spices were used to disguise bad meat, pointing out that this would have been as fatal then as it would be today. She suggests instead that spices were used to hide the taste of salt, which was used to preserve food in the absence of refrigeration.

Cradock asserted: "The English have never had a cuisine. Even Yorkshire pudding comes from Burgundy." However, a recipe for "a dripping pudding" was published in the 1737 book The Whole Duty of a Woman. Nicola Humble observed that in Mrs Beeton's Book of Household Management, there are about the same number of recipes from India as from Wales, Scotland and Ireland together. Panayi created controversy by asserting, with evidence, that fish and chips had foreign origins: the fried fish from Jewish cooking and the potato chips from France; the dish only came to signify national identity from about 1930. French cuisine powerfully influenced English cooking throughout the nineteenth century, and French celebrity chefs such as the Roux brothers and Raymond Blanc have continued to do so in twenty-first-century England.

=== The role of Empire ===
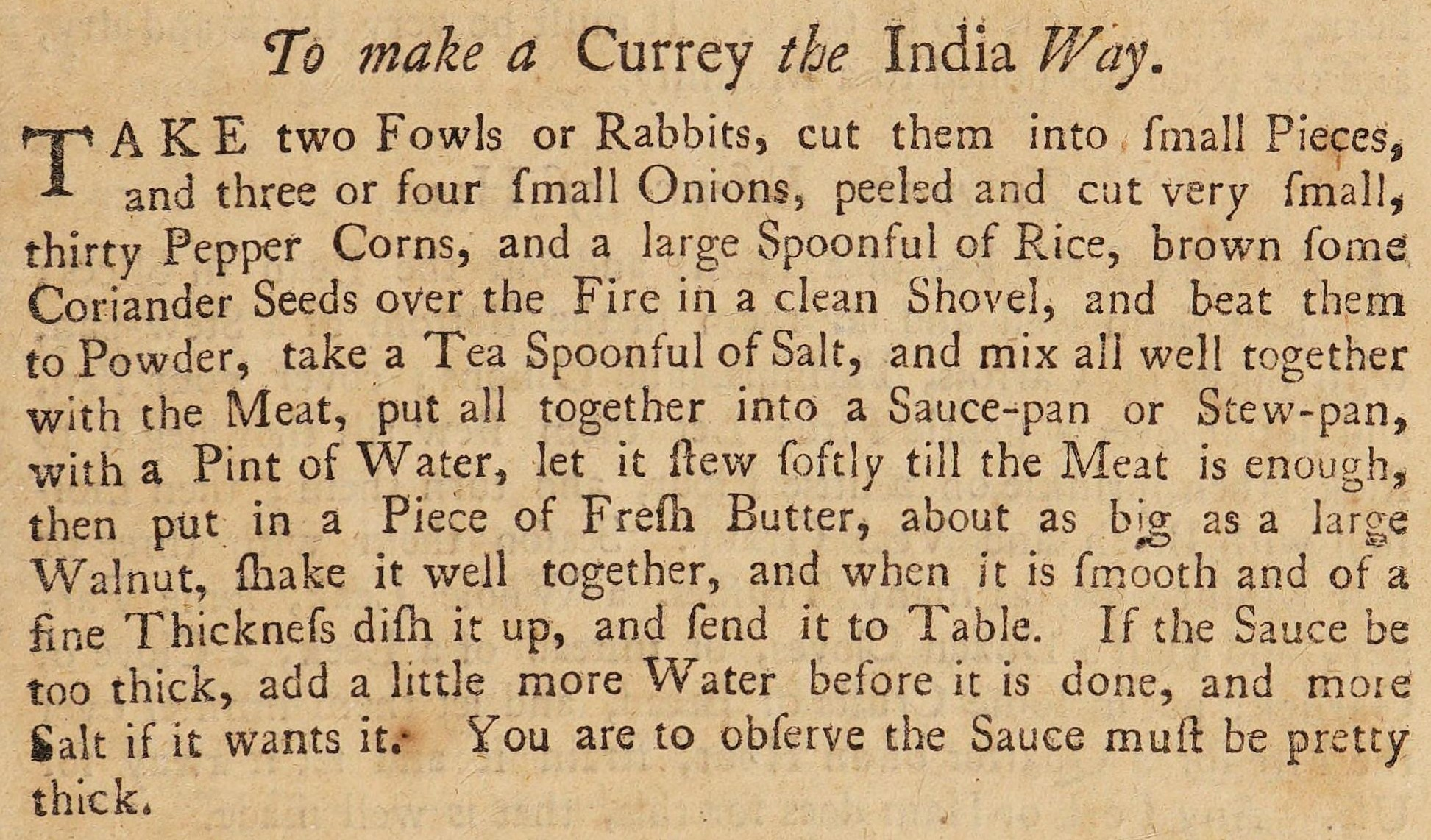
Receipt To make a Currey the India Way from The Art of Cookery by Hannah Glasse, 1748 edition

Curry was created by the arrival of the British in India in the seventeenth century, beginning as bowls of spicy sauce used, Lizzie Collingham writes, to add "bite to the rather bland flavours of boiled and roasted meats." Hannah Glasse's The Art of Cookery, first published in 1747, contains what Dickson Wright calls a "famous recipe" which describes how "To make a currey the Indian way"; it flavours chicken with onions fried in butter, the chicken being fried with turmeric, ginger and ground pepper, and stewed in its own stock with cream and lemon juice. Dickson Wright comments that she was "a bit sceptical" of this recipe, as it had few of the expected spices, but was "pleasantly surprised by the result" which had "a very good and interesting flavour".

The process of adapting Indian cooking continued for centuries. Anglo-Indian recipes could completely ignore Indian rules of diet, for example by using pork or beef. Some dishes, such as "liver curry, with bacon" were simply ordinary recipes spiced up with ingredients such as curry powder. In other cases like kedgeree, Indian dishes were adapted to British tastes; khichari was originally a simple dish of lentils and rice. Curry was accepted in almost all Victorian era cookery books, such as Eliza Acton's Modern Cookery for Private Families (1845): she offered recipes for curried sweetbreads and curried macaroni, merging Indian and European foods into standard English cooking. By 1895, curry was included in Dainty Dishes for Slender Incomes, aimed at the poorer classes.

Foreign influence was by no means limited to specific dishes. James Walvin, in his book Fruits of Empire, argues that potatoes, sugar (entirely imported until around 1900 and the growing of sugar beet), tea, and coffee as well as increasing quantities of spices were "Fruits of Empire" that became established in Britain between 1660 and 1800, so that by the nineteenth century "their exotic origins had been lost in the mists of time" and had become "part of the unquestioned fabric of local life".

=== Indian and Anglo-Indian cuisine ===
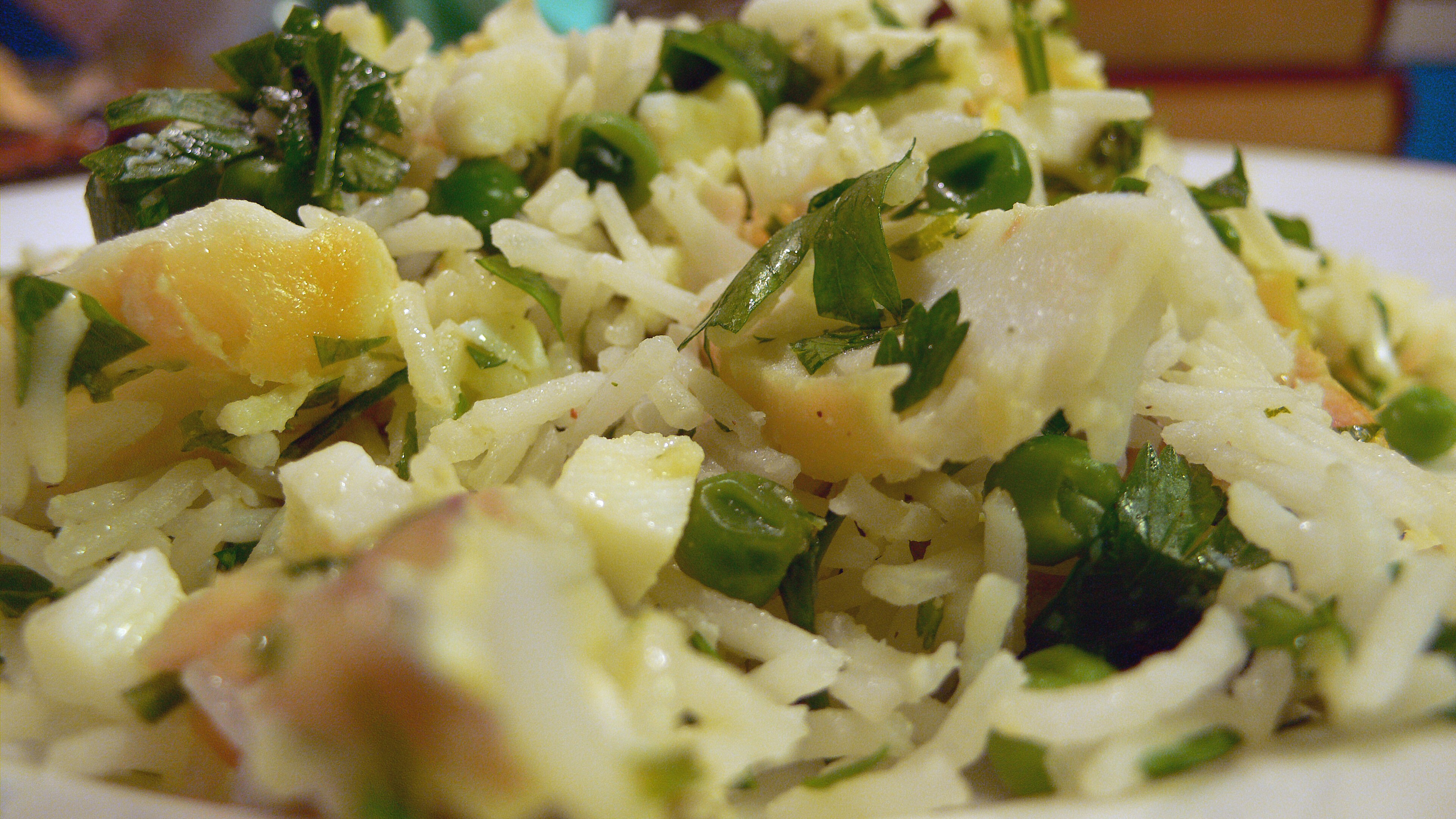
Kedgeree, 1790, became a popular breakfast dish in the 19th century.

During the British Raj, Britain first started borrowing Indian dishes, creating Anglo-Indian cuisine, with dishes such as kedgeree (1790) and Mulligatawny soup (1791). Indian food was served in coffee houses from 1809, and cooked at home from a similar date as cookbooks of the time attest. The Veeraswamy restaurant in Regent Street, London, was opened in 1926, at first serving Anglo-Indian food, and is the oldest surviving Indian restaurant in Britain. There was a sharp increase in the number of curry houses in the 1940s, and again in the 1970s.

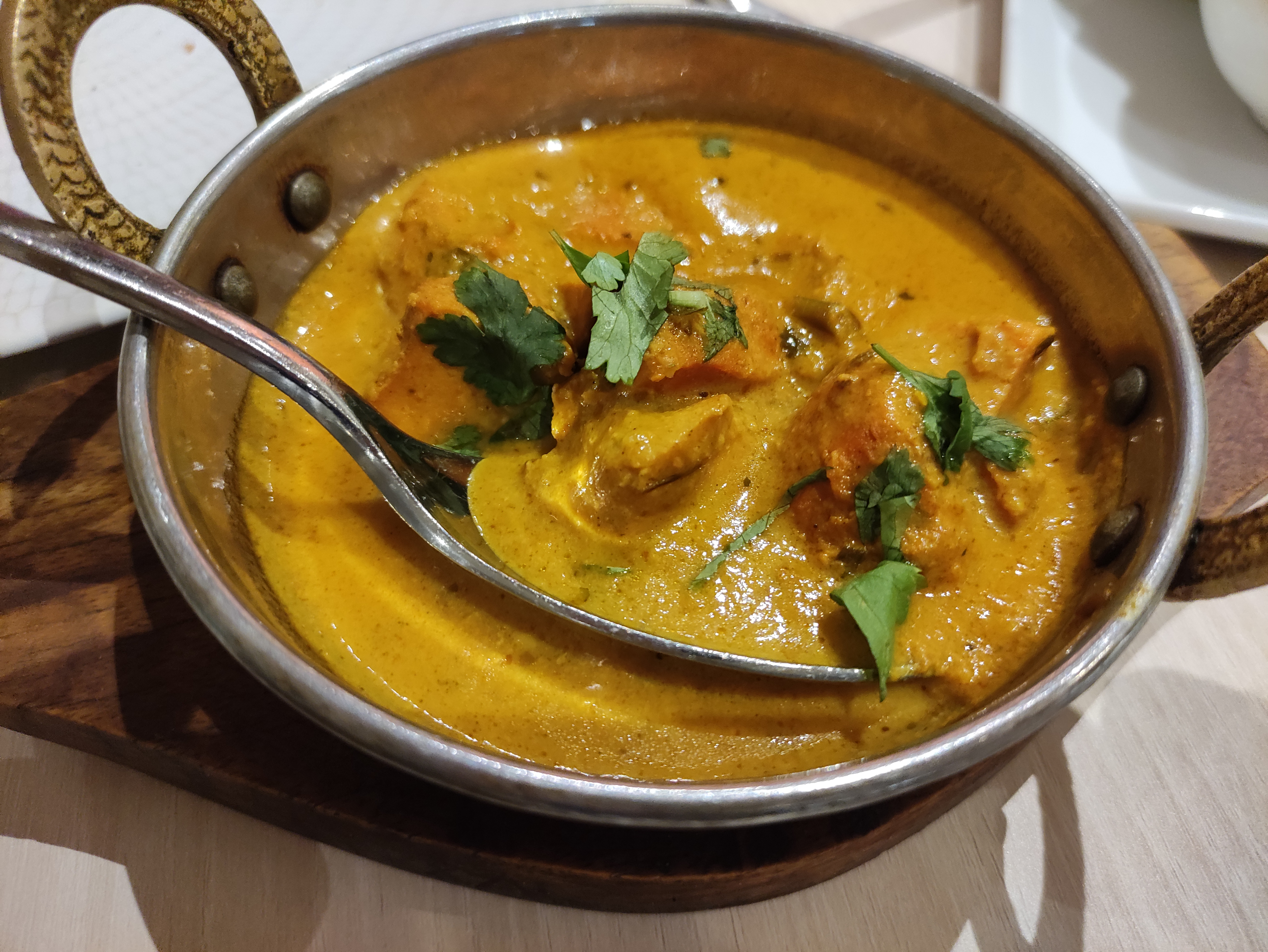
Chicken tikka masala, 1970s, adapted from the Indian chicken tikka and now widely considered "a true British national dish."

The post-colonial British Indian dish chicken tikka masala was apparently invented in Glasgow in the early 1970s, while balti cuisine was introduced to Britain in 1977 in Birmingham. In 2003, there were roughly 9,000 restaurants serving Indian cuisine in Britain. The majority of Indian restaurants in Britain are run by entrepreneurs of Bangladeshi (often Sylhetis) and Pakistani origin. According to Britain's Food Standards Agency, the Indian food industry in the United Kingdom was worth £3.2 billion in 2003, accounting for two-thirds of all eating out, and serving about 2.5 million British customers every week. The number of restaurants peaked at some 12,000 in 2015, decreasing to some 8,000 by 2023.

Indian restaurants typically allow the diner to combine base ingredients — chicken, prawns or "meat" (lamb or mutton) — with curry sauces — from the mild korma to the scorching phall — without regard to the authenticity of the combination. The reference point for flavour and spice heat is the Madras curry sauce (the name represents the area of India where restaurateurs obtained their spices, rather than an actual dish). Other sauces are sometimes variations on a basic curry sauce: for instance, vindaloo is often rendered as a fiery dish of lamb or chicken in a Madras sauce with extra chilli, rather than the Luso-Indian dish of pork marinated in wine vinegar and garlic, based on a Goan Portuguese dish carne de vinha d'alhos.

Indian restaurants and their cuisine in Britain gradually improved from the stereotypical flock wallpaper and standardised menus. One of the pioneers was the Bombay Brasserie, which opened in Gloucester Road, London, in 1982, serving the kind of food actually eaten in India. Vegetarian Indian restaurants opened in the 1980s in the Drummond Street area of Euston, London. In 1990 Chutney Mary followed in Chelsea. In 2001, two Indian restaurants in London, Tamarind (opened 1995) and Zaika (opened 1999) gained Michelin stars for the quality of their cooking.

Indian cuisine is the most popular alternative to traditional cooking in Britain, followed by Chinese and Italian food. By 2015, chicken tikka masala was one of Britain's most popular dishes.

=== Southeast and East Asian cuisines ===
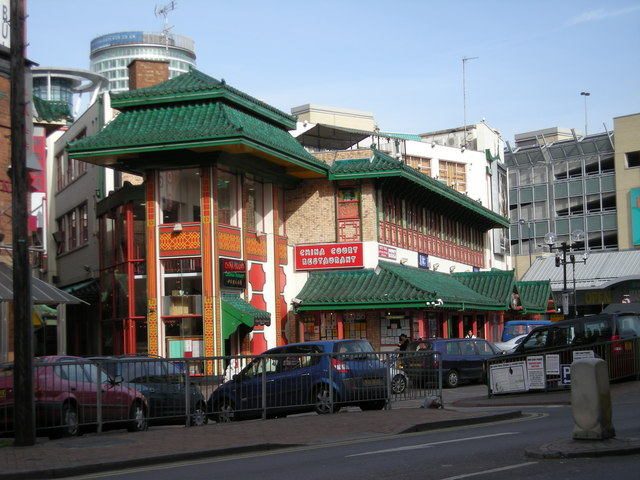
An English Chinatown, here in Birmingham

Southeast and East Asian cuisines have become widely available across England. Chinese cuisine became established in England by the 1970s, with large cities often having a Chinatown district; the one in London's Soho developed between the two world wars, following an informal area in Limehouse. Deriving from Cantonese cuisine, the food served by Chinese restaurants has been adapted to suit English taste. From around 1980 onwards, Southeast Asian cuisines, especially Thai and Vietnamese, began to gain popularity in England.

=== European cuisines ===
Italian cuisine is the most popular Mediterranean cuisine in England. In its current form, inspired by Elizabeth David, its rise began after 1945. There were some Italian restaurants before World War II, but they mostly served a generalised haute cuisine. Soon after the war, Italian coffee bars appeared, the first places to trade on their Italian identity; they soon started to sell simple and cheap Italian food such as minestrone soup, spaghetti and pizza. From the early 1960s, the slightly more elegant trattoria restaurants offered "Italian specialities" such as lasagne verdi al forno (baked lasagne, coloured with spinach). Other Mediterranean influences include Greek moussaka, feta and taramasalata, Turkish doner and shish kebabs, and Middle Eastern hummus.

French cuisine in England is largely restricted to expensive restaurants, although there are some inexpensive French bistros. For many years, English writers including Hannah Glasse in the 18th century and Andrew Kirwan in the 19th century were ambivalent about French cooking. However, restaurants serving French haute cuisine developed for the upper and middle classes in England from the 1830s and Escoffier was recruited by the Savoy Hotel in 1890. Marcel Boulestin's 1923 Simple French Cooking for English Homes did much to popularise French dishes.

== Food establishments ==
=== Cafes and tea shops ===
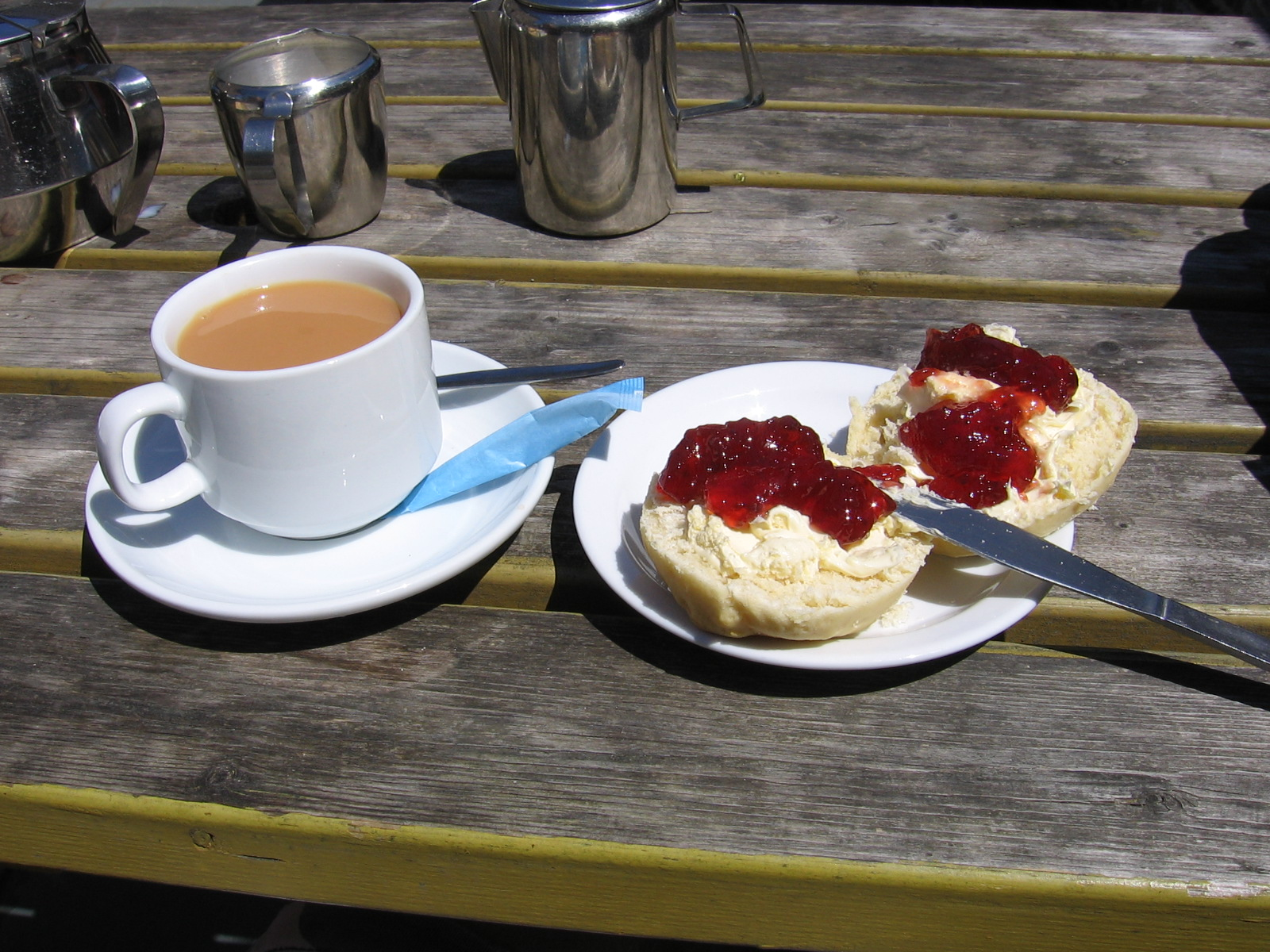
Cream tea, comprising tea taken with scones, clotted cream and jam, in Boscastle

The English cafe is a small, inexpensive eating place. A working men's cafe serves mainly fried or grilled food, such as fried eggs, bacon, bangers and mash‚ black pudding, bubble and squeak, burgers, sausages, mushrooms and chips. These may be accompanied by baked beans, cooked tomatoes, and fried bread. These are referred to as "breakfast" even if they are available all day. Traditional cafes have declined with the rise of fast-food chains, but remain numerous all over the UK.

A tea shop is a small restaurant that serves soft drinks and light meals, often in a sedate atmosphere. Customers may eat a cream tea in Cornish or Devonshire style, served from a china set, and a scone with jam and clotted cream.

=== Fish and chip shops ===
Fish and chips is a hot dish consisting of battered fish, commonly Atlantic cod or haddock, and chips. It is a common take-away food.

Western Sephardic Jews settling in England from the 16th century fried fish in the style of Spanish pescado frito, coated in flour and fried in oil. Chips appeared in the Victorian era; Dickens's 1859 A Tale of Two Cities mentions "husky chips of potatoes, fried with some reluctant drops of oil". Panayi states that fish and chip shops in the 1920s were often run by Jews or Italians. Despite this, the new dish was popularly attributed to France; The Times recorded that "potatoes chipped and fried in the French manner were introduced in Lancashire with great success about 1871." (Note: The Financial Times noted of Panayi's claim of these facts on 9 January 2004 "Kosher French Connection with Fish and Chips" while the Daily Star announced "Le Great British Feesh and Cheeps: It's Frog Nosh Claims Prof".) The Fish Trades Gazette of 29 July 1922 stated that "Later there was introduced into this country the frying and purveying of chip potatoes from France ... which had made the fried fish trade what it is today."

=== Pub food ===
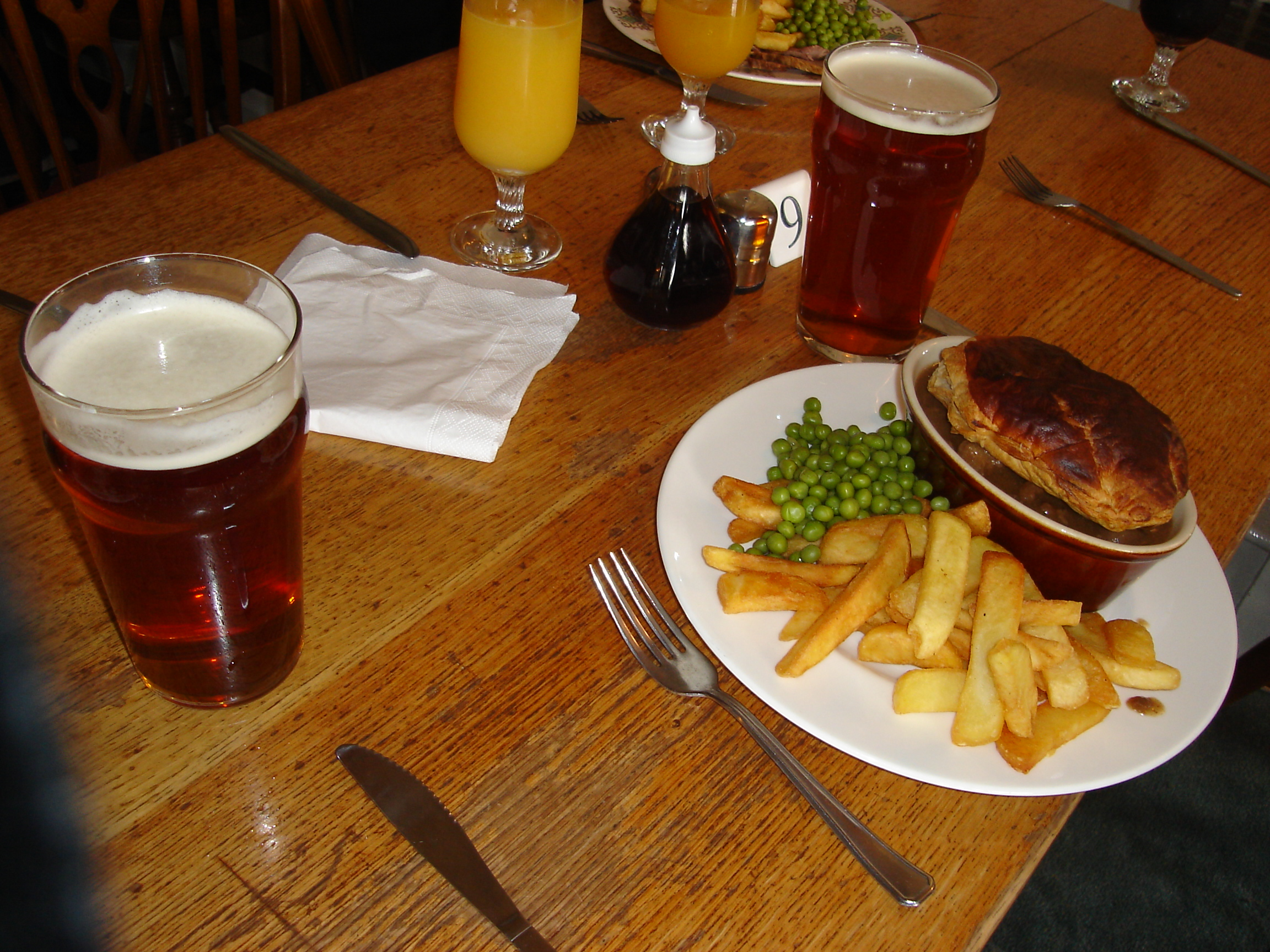
Pub grub – a pie, along with a pint

The public house, or pub, is a famous English institution. In the mid-20th century, pubs were drinking establishments with little emphasis on the serving of food, other than "bar snacks", such as pork scratchings, pickled eggs, salted crisps, and peanuts, which helped to increase beer sales. If a pub served meals these were usually basic cold dishes such as a ploughman's lunch, invented in the 1950s.

In the 1950s some British pubs started to offer "a pie and a pint", with hot individual steak and ale pies made on the premises by the landlord or his wife. In the 1960s this was developed into the then-fashionable "chicken in a basket", a portion of roast chicken with chips, served on a napkin, in a wicker basket, by the Mill pub at Withington. Quality dropped but variety increased with the introduction of microwave ovens and freezer food. "Pub grub" expanded to include British food items such as steak and kidney pudding, shepherd's pie, fish and chips, bangers and mash, Sunday roast, and pasties. The gastropub movement of the 21st century, on the other hand, has sought to serve restaurant-quality food, cooked to order from fresh ingredients, in a pub setting; one pub, The Hand & Flowers in Marlow has been awarded two Michelin stars, and several have one star. In 1964, pubs were serving 9.1% of meals eaten outside the home; this rose rapidly to 37.5% by 1997.

== Vegetarianism ==
Modern Western vegetarianism was founded in the United Kingdom in 1847 with the world's first Vegetarian Society. It has increased markedly since the end of the Second World War, when there were around 100,000 vegetarians in the country. By 2003 there were between 3 and 4 million vegetarians in the UK, one of the highest percentages in the Western world, while around 7 million people claim to eat no red meat. By 2015, 11 of 22 restaurant chains studied by the Vegan Society had at least one vegan main course on their menu, though only 6 of these explicitly labelled them as vegan dishes. Top-end vegetarian restaurants remain relatively few, though they are increasing rapidly: there were some 20 in Britain in 2007, rising to 30 in 2010.

== Quality ==
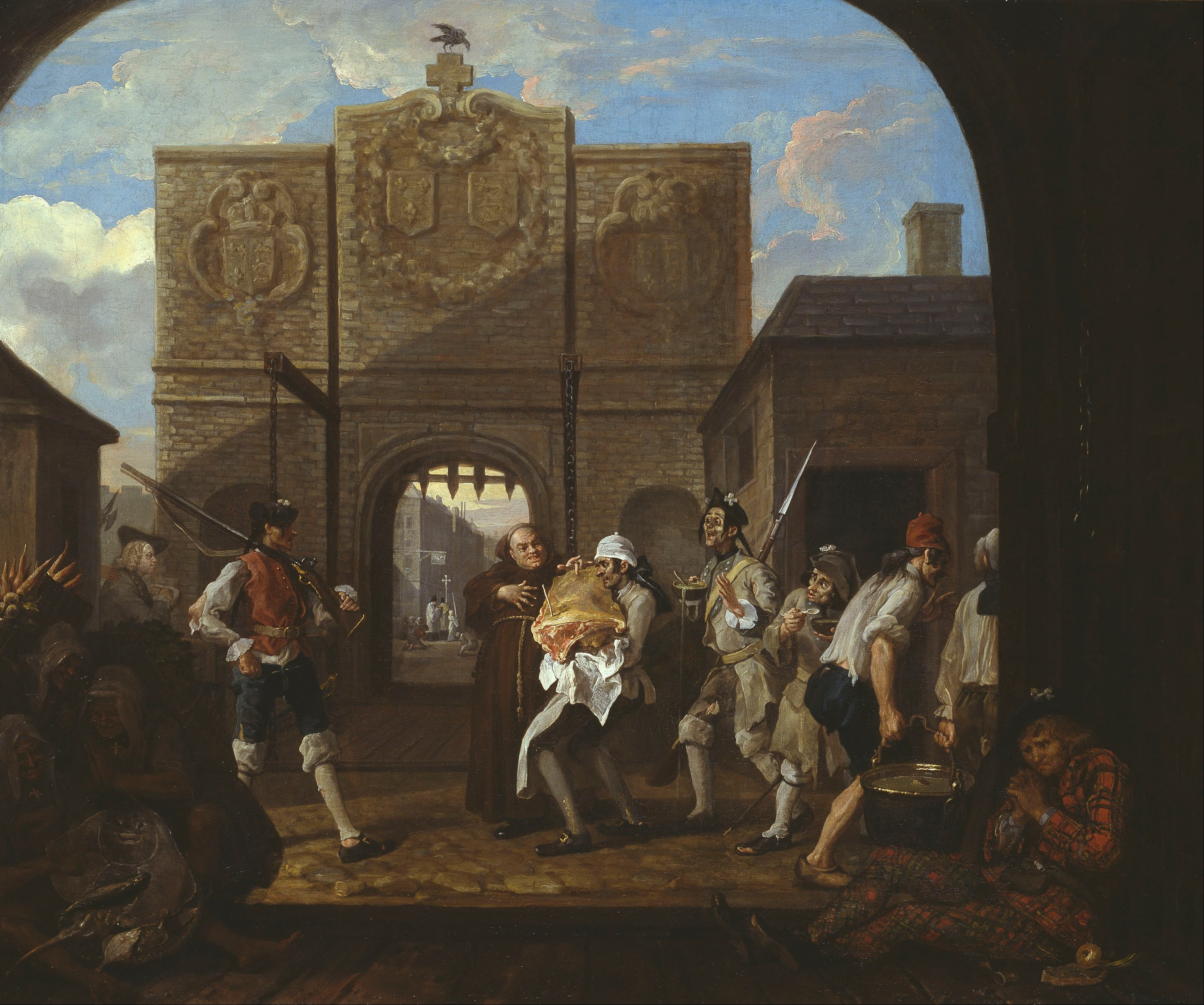
William Hogarth's O the Roast Beef of Old England (The Gate of Calais), 1748

English cuisine in the twentieth century suffered from a poor international reputation. Keith Arscott of Chawton House Library comments that "at one time people didn't think the English knew how to cook and yet these [eighteenth and nineteenth century] female writers were at the forefront of modern-day cooking." English food was popularly supposed to be bland, but English cuisine has made extensive use of spices since the Middle Ages, introduced curry to Europe, and makes use of strong flavourings such as English mustard. It was similarly reputed to be dull, like roast beef, but that dish was highly prized both in Britain and abroad, and few people could afford it; the "Roast Beef of Old England" lauded by William Hogarth in his 1748 painting celebrated the high quality of English cattle, which the French at the "Gate of Calais" (the other name of his painting) could only look at with envy. The years of wartime shortages and rationing certainly did impair the variety and flavour of English food during the twentieth century, but the nation's cooking recovered from this with increasing prosperity and the availability of new ingredients from soon after the Second World War.

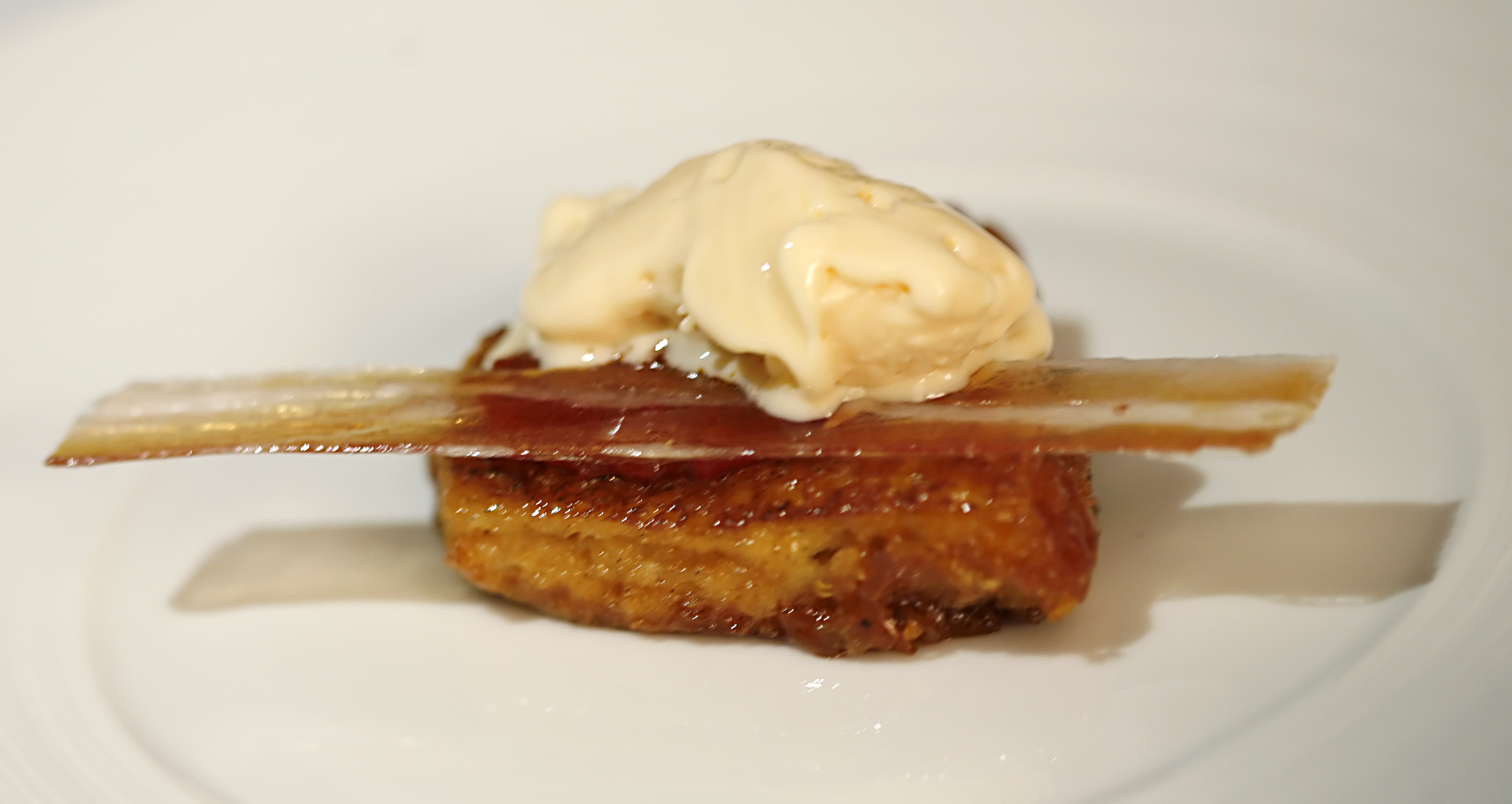
Scrambled egg and bacon ice cream, as served at The Fat Duck restaurant

In 2005, 600 food critics writing for the British Restaurant magazine named 14 British restaurants among the 50 best restaurants in the world, the number one being The Fat Duck in Bray, Berkshire, led by its chef Heston Blumenthal. The quality of London's best restaurants has made the city a leading centre of international cuisine.

Meanwhile, the list of United Kingdom food and drink products with protected status (PDO) under European Union law has increased rapidly, with 59 items including Cornish sardines, Yorkshire Wensleydale cheese and Yorkshire forced rhubarb, Fenland celery, West Country lamb and beef and traditional Cumberland sausage listed as registered in 2015, and a further 13 including Birmingham Balti listed as applied for. By 2016 there were 12 cheeses from England with PDO status.

== See also ==
- Leeds University Library's Cookery Collection
- List of English cheeses – over 700 varieties of cheese are produced in England

== Sources ==
- Carroll, R. (1996). Utilis Coquinario and its Unnamed Author. Oxford Symposium on Food and Cookery, 1995. pp. 45–51. ISBN 978-0-907325-72-7.
- Dickson Wright, Clarissa (2011). A History of English Food. Random House. ISBN 978-1-905211-85-2.
- Lehmann, Gilly (2003). The British Housewife. Prospect Books.
- Panayi, Panikos (2010) [2008]. Spicing Up Britain. Reaktion Books. ISBN 978-1-86189-658-2.
