= Battalia pie =

Large game pie

Battalia pie (obsolete spelling battaglia pye) is an English large game pie, or occasionally a fish pie, filled with many small "blessed" pieces, beatilles, of offal, in a gravy made from meat stock flavoured with spices and lemon. The dish was described in cookery books of the 17th and 18th centuries.

Confusion with words for battle led to the pie being crenellated, or shaped to resemble a castle with towers.

== Etymology ==
A battalia pie was so named because it was filled with beatilles, small blessed objects (from Latin beatus, blessed) such as, according to the Oxford English Dictionary, "Cocks-combs, Goose-gibbets, Ghizzards, Livers, and other Appurtenances of Fowls (1706)". (Note: The Closet of Sir Kenelm Digby similarly defines "Beatilies, beatilia, battalia" as "tit-bits (e.g. cockscombs or sweetbreads) in a pie.") The Oxford Companion to Food records that the Latin etymon was originally used to reference religious items such as rosaries and nun's pincushions, before its co-option by cooks. It is not connected with Italian battaglia, battle, but it was regularly confused with that meaning, and battalia pies were built with crenellated battlements around the edges, and sometimes as castles complete with towers.

== Recipe ==
The 1656 cookery book The Compleat Cook by "W. M." gives an early recipe for battalia pie:

Take four tame Pigeons and Trusse them to bake, and take foure Oxe Pallats well boyled and blanched, and cut it in little pieces; take six Lamb stones, and as many good Sweet breads of Veale cut in halfs and parboyl'd, and twenty Cockscombs boyled add blanched, and the bottoms of four Hartichoaks, and a Pint of Oysters parboyled and bearded, and the Marrow of three bones, so season all with Mace, Nutmeg and Salt; so put your meat in a Coffin (Note: A casing, for example in Thomas Dawson's The Good Huswifes Jewell.) of Fine Paste proportionable to your quantity of meat; put halfe a pound of Butter upon your meat, put a little water in the Pye, before it be set in the Oven, let it stand in the Oven an houre and a halfe, then take it out, pour out the butter at the top of the Pye, and put it in leer of Gravy, butter, and Lemons, and serve it up.

In his 1660 cookery book The Accomplisht Cook, Robert May gives a recipe "To make a Bisk or Batalia Pie", which instructs:

Take six peeping Pigeons, and as many peeping small chickens, truss them to bake; then have six oxe pallets well boil'd and blancht, (Note: Bones were cooked to add flavour and to release gelatine.) and cut in little pieces; then take six lamb-stones, and as many good veal sweet-breads cut in halves and parboil'd, twenty cocks-combs boil'd and blanch'd, the bottoms of four artichocks boiled and blanched, a quart of great oysters parboil'd and bearded, also the marrow of four bones seasoned with pepper, nutmeg, mace, and salt; fill the pye with the meat, and mingle some pistaches amongst it, cock-stones, knots, or yolks of hard eggs, and some butter, close it up and bake it (an hour and half will bake it) but before you set it in the oven, put into it a little fair water: Being baked pour out the butter, and liquor it with gravy, butter beaten up thick, slic't lemon, and serve it up.

Or you may bake this bisk in a patty-pan or dish. Sometimes use sparagus and interlarded bacon. For the paste of this dish, take three quarts of flour, and three quarters of a pound of butter, boil the butter in fair water, and make up the paste hot and quick.

Otherways in the summer time, make the paste of cold butter; to three quarts of flour take a pound and a half of butter, and work it dry into the flour, with the yolks of four eggs and one white, then put a little water to it, and make it up into a stiff paste.

John Nott's 1723 The Cooks and Confectioners Dictionary gives a recipe for battalia pie with fish:

Make a very large Pye, and cut with Battlements, garnish the Coffing with as many Towers as will contain your several sorts of Fish; dry your Coffin well, and wash it over on the inside with Yolks of Eggs, and flour it in the bottom; then having either broil’d or fry’d your Fish brown, place the Head of a Salmon, cut pretty large beyond the Gills, in the middle of your Pye, forc’d, and bak’d in an Oven: Set the Heads of your other Fish upon forced Meat, and place your several sorts of Fish one opposite to the other in their several Partitions, and pour all over your Fish, Cockles, Prawns, Oysters, and Periwinkles boil’d up in their proper Lairs, (Note: A lear or caudle was a thickened sauce poured through a hole into a pie shortly before serving. Eliza Smith's lear consisted of "Claret, Gravy, Oyster Liquor, two or three Anchovies, a faggot of sweet Herbs and an Onion; boil up and thicken with brown Butter, then pour into your savoury Pies when called for.") and thicken’d with drawn Butter. Remember to lay your forced Heads over the Battlements.

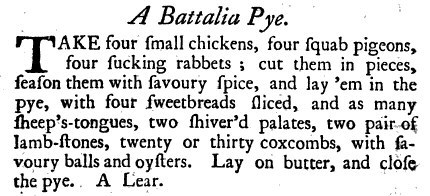
Recipe for Battalia Pye from Eliza Smith's The Compleat Housewife, 9th edition, 1739

In the early 18th century, female cookbook authors began to omit the towers. One such omission appears in Eliza Smith's 1727 cookery book The Compleat Housewife, where battalia pie is described as follows:

Take four small chickens, four squab pigeons, four sucking rabbets; cut them in pieces, season them with savoury spice, and lay 'em in the pye, with four sweetbreads sliced, and as many sheep's tongues, two shiver'd palates, two pair of lamb-stones, twenty or thirty coxcombs, with savoury balls and oysters. Lay on butter, and close the pye. A Lear.

This recipe, according to food historians Keith Stavely and Kathleen Fitzgerald, was an attempt "to introduce the older aristocratic style to women cooks". A recipe for battalia pie was omitted entirely by Hannah Glasse in her 1747 The Art of Cookery Made Plain and Easy, and she dismissed its components as an "odd Jumble of Things" in line with her then modern philosophy of cooking simplicity. Recipes for battalia pie continued to appear in books and magazines. In 1741, the London Family Magazine published a recipe, and in her 1750 of A Collection of Scarce and Valuable Recipes, the English cook Anne Battam includes a recipe for "battalia pie".

Stavely and Fitzgerald credit Marie-Antoine Carême, an influential French chef of the early 19th century, with finally dispelling dishes like battalia pie from European diets. Carême opposed the practice of accompanying dishes with ingredients such as sweetbreads and cockscombs, and advocated that foods be garnished according to the principle of "meat with meat, fish with fish". Smith's recipe continued to be published through the 19th century, in Michael Willis's 1831 Cookery Made Easy, and in Anne Walbank Buckland's 1893 book, Our Viands: Whence they Come and How they are Cooked.

== In literature ==
Former prime minister of the United Kingdom and author Benjamin Disraeli describes an English dinner of the previous century in his 1837 novel Venetia, with

that masterpiece of the culinary art, a great battalia pie, in which the bodies of chickens, pigeons, and rabbits, were embalmed in spices, cock's combs, and savoury balls, and well bedewed with one of those rich sauces of claret, anchovy, and sweet herbs ... [on] the cover of this pastry ... the curious cook had contrived to represent all the once-living forms that were now entombed in that gorgeous sepulchre.

== Recreations ==
Battalia pies were recreated at Naworth Castle in 2006 and at Westport House, Ireland in 2015.
