= A History of English Food =

2011 non-fiction book by Clarissa Dickson Wright

- Author: Clarissa Dickson Wright
- Language: English
- Subject: Cookery
- Genre: Non-fiction
- Published: 2011 (Random House)
- Publication place: England
- Pages: 500
- ISBN: 978-1-905-21185-2
- OCLC: 751745454

A History of English Food is a 2011 non-fiction book, a history of English cuisine arranged by period from the Middle Ages to the end of the twentieth century, written by the celebrity cook Clarissa Dickson Wright and published in London by Random House. Each period is treated in turn with a chapter. The text combines history, recipes, and anecdotes, and is illustrated with 32 pages of colour plates.

The book was marked as a future classic by The Independent; it was welcomed by critics from The Telegraph and The Spectator as giving the reader a sense of being present in each period described with the lively personal approach, but disliked by the critic in The Guardian as unsystematic and snobbish.

== Book ==
=== Approach ===
The book is divided into 15 chapters, forming a strict chronological sequence of periods such as "the Georgian age", from around 1150 to around 2000. The chapters describe the society of each time, often starting with the monarch and rich food and drink, and proceeding down to ordinary people and the common foods of the period. The narrative freely combine outlines of the historical context, descriptions of recipes, stories about significant figures, and personal anecdotes. For example, "The Medieval Larder" has an extensive section on the "medieval pig", leading into a description of Dickson Wright's own childhood memories of helping to kill her father's pigs and making black pudding, chitterlings and sausages, as well as having hams and bacon smoked. To this is added her personal opinion; thus, the medieval chapter ends "The battles of Crécy and Agincourt would scarcely have been won had they been fought by soldiers from a destitute nation."

Each chapter is opened with a monochrome illustration from its period, with a detailed caption. There are 32 pages of colour plates illustrating famous cookery writers such as Robert May and stages of English cuisine such as "The 1950s kitchen".

=== Contents ===
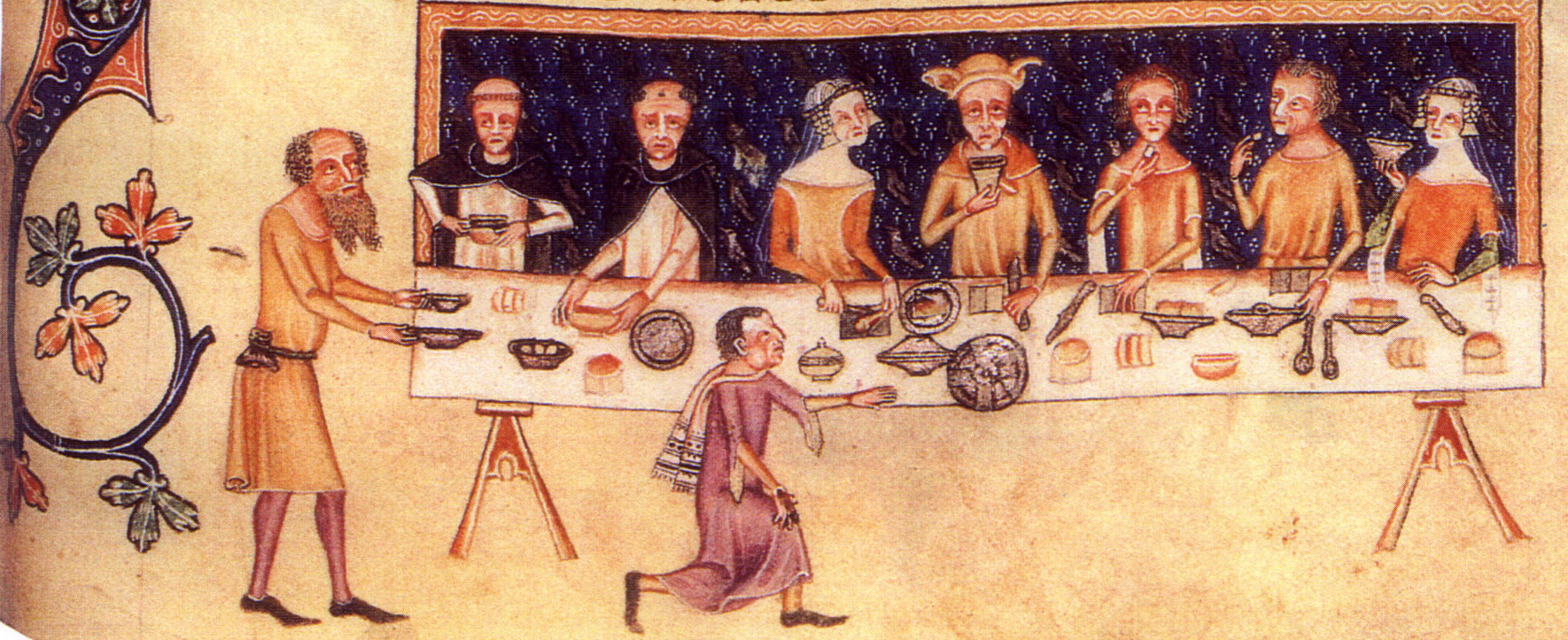
Dining room scene from the Luttrell Psalter, c. 1330, showing Sir Geoffrey Luttrell, a wealthy landowner, at table: it is set with knives and spoons. Forks arrived in the 17th century.

The book begins with a short introduction, in which Dickson Wright states that her "great passions" include food and history, so that she "always knew" she would come to write the book. She adds that another passion is field sports, "providing food and controlling pests and vermin", and that this runs like a "silver thread" through the book.

Dickson Wright begins around 1150 in the reign of King Henry II and Eleanor of Aquitaine, a time of relative peace and wealth. The diet she describes included rabbit, deer, carp farmed in ponds, eels, salmon, poultry, sheep, cattle, cheese, pigs, bread, onions, parsnips, carrots, and beans, washed down with wine and beer. Spices such as pepper, cinnamon, and ginger were costly, and not used to try to make rotten meat acceptable; Dickson Wright suggests they more likely masked the salt used to preserve food. The 14th century The Forme of Cury often uses sugar alongside spices. Recipes were complex; many dishes were served in pastry. Each kind of meat was served with spices thought appropriate to it: for example, venison was eaten with sugar and cinnamon.

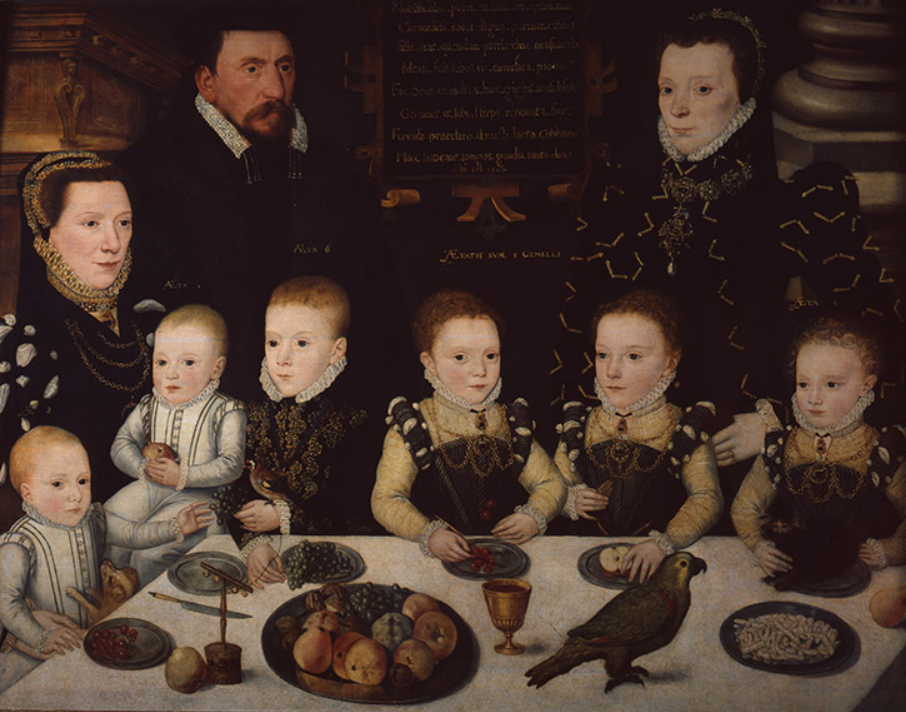
In Tudor times, William Brooke, 10th Baron Cobham, is seen with his family at table in 1567. Dickson Wright comments that the bowl of fresh fruit is unusual for the period.

Dickson Wright describes in detail the diet and lifestyle of the Tudor Kings; under the influence of Catherine of Aragon, Henry VIII drank Spanish sherry, imported oranges, and planted salad gardens. Enormous confections were made of marzipan. Commoners too might eat sea and freshwater fish, or beef, though bacon, according to Andrew Boorde in 1542 was "good for carters and plowmen". With the separation of the Church of England from the Church of Rome, religious fasting was reduced, and the fasting rules were relaxed in the time of Elizabeth I, so that eggs, cheese, and milk were allowed even on fast days. Pastry developed from 'coffin' cases meant only to hold the food inside during cooking and serving; now pies and pasties of all kinds were available to travellers. Milk and cream were used in desserts such as junkets and syllabubs. A treat might consist of buns made with eggs, raisins, and spices. In 1604, Elinor Fettiplace compiled a Receipt Book; she had married into an ancient aristocratic family – a Fettiplace fought at the Battle of Hastings in 1066; at least 20 people ate at her table every day. She lists several recipes for bitter Seville oranges. Food is strongly seasonal; she pickles buds, vegetables, and fruits in season, and makes a spiced fruit cake for 100 people for a harvest or other feast. My Lord of Devonshire's Pudding is made of sliced white bread, dates, raisins, marrow or butter, cream, eggs, cinnamon, nutmeg, and sugar—a recipe that Dickson Wright specially likes.

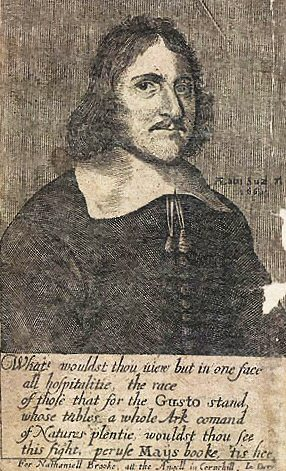
Dickson Wright calls Robert May, author of the 1660 The Accomplisht Cook, a major figure in English cuisine.

James I brought a new approach to English food in the Stuart era, introducing Scottish customs of boiling puddings in a cloth, cold-smoking fish, and baking biscuits such as shortbread. Gervase Markham's 1615 The English Huswife calls for ingredients as varied as asparagus, capers, olives, lemons, and spinach. Robert May's 1660 The Accomplisht Cook is based on his time in Paris, followed by being cook to the Grocer's Company and to the Star Chamber, providing elaborate feasts. He gives instructions for fattening up wild birds like godwits by force-feeding. He offers multiple recipes for sturgeon, at that time common in England's rivers. The East India Company increased foreign trade in the 17th century, bringing spices, pepper, cloves, mace, nutmeg, and tea from the East. Meanwhile, bananas appeared from Bermuda. The Duke of York told the diarist Samuel Pepys that English seamen ate only "peas, pork, and boiled beef". The adventurer Sir Kenelm Digby, alongside many activities at King James's court, in Italy, and in Spain, wrote a 1669 cookery book, The Closet of the Eminently Learned Sir Kenelme Digbie Knight Opened. Many of the recipes are attributed to aristocratic connections; his Pan Cotto is "as the Cardinals use in Rome". King James II's coronation banquet in 1685 presented some "1,500 dishes ranging from puffins to pistachio creams" in Westminster Hall. Gin, at first imported from Holland to accompany William of Orange's Glorious Revolution of 1688, was soon widely distilled; the resultant heavy drinking led to the 1736 Gin Act. John Evelyn praised salads in his "pompous and verbose" 1699 book Aceteria: A Discourse of Sallets. The slave trade brought molasses, rum, and sugar, and black domestic servants to England.

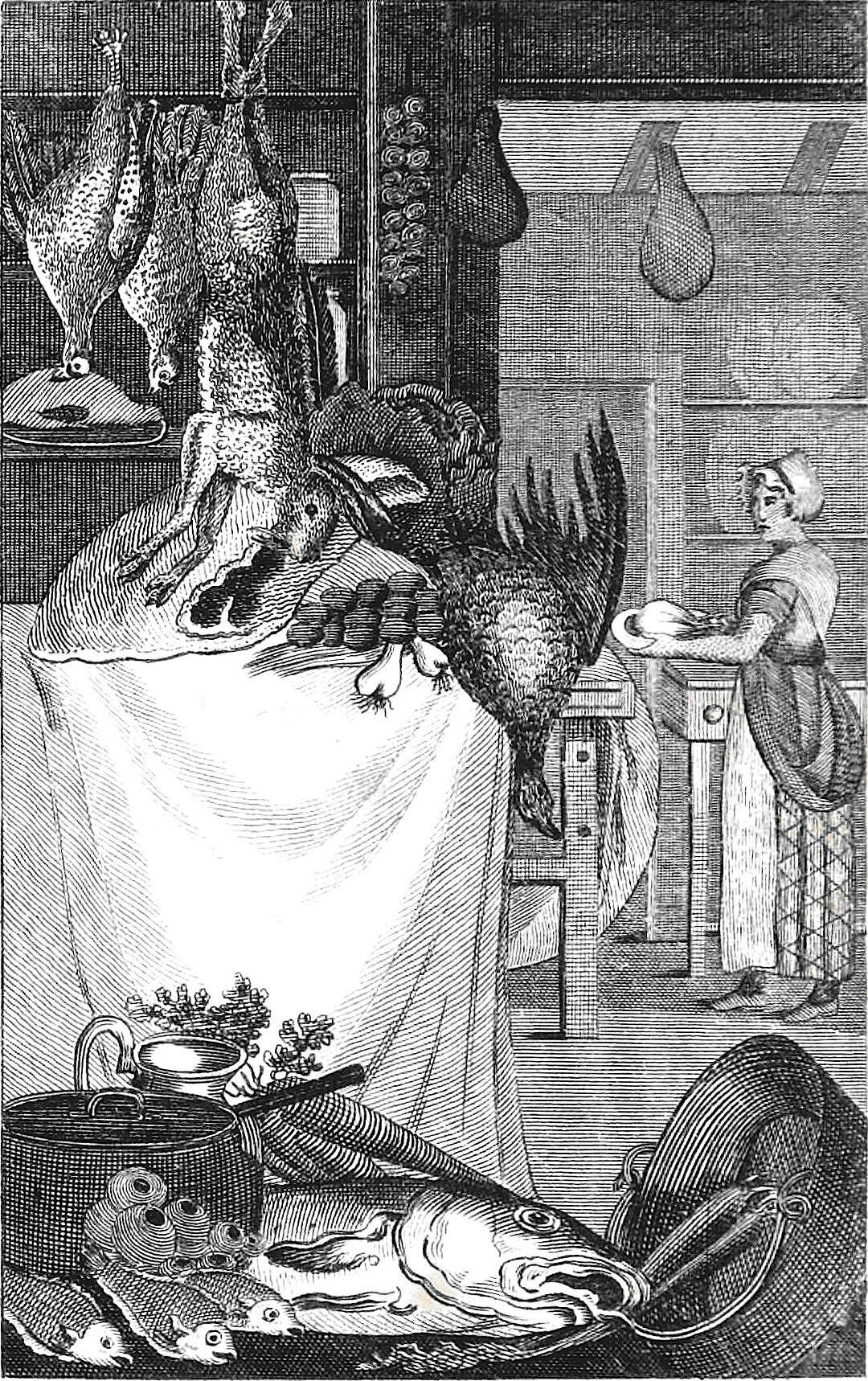
Hannah Glasse's The Art of Cookery Made Plain and Easy, frontispiece. Dickson Wright saw Glasse as one of the "great figures" in English cuisine.

Roasting and baking became less laborious with Georgian era innovations in fireplace and oven design, approaching a kitchen range; the poor prepared their pies and took them to the bakery to be cooked. Josiah Wedgwood made fine earthenware dinner services for George III and the middle class. Teapots diversified; Thomas Twining opened London's first tea-shop for ladies in 1717. In Dundee, James Keiller made marmalade from bitter Seville oranges. Parson James Woodforde described sumptuous Georgian meals in his country parish. The 18th century, with a literate audience, saw the birth of English cookery books for the general public: some 300 appeared in the century. Hannah Glasse's The Art of Cookery Made Plain and Easy came out in 1746 and went through 17 editions by 1800. Dickson Wright comments that the text is clear and simple, and the recipes, "a delight to follow", always work. Glasse introduces recipes for curry, and for ice cream.

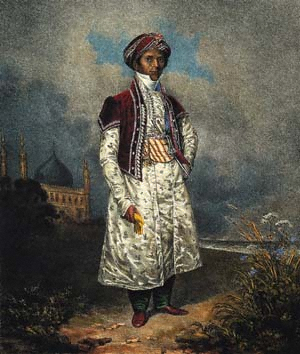
Sake Dean Mahomed opened an Indian restaurant in Portman Square, London, 1810.

In the 19th century, Marie-Antoine Carême, who had worked for the Czar of Russia, introduced the modern system of separate soup, fish, meat, and dessert courses à la russe. Alexis Soyer introduced elegant and complex French cuisine for the wealthy, and catered for the 1851 Great Exhibition, feeding 1000 people a day. Charles Dickens's 1843 A Christmas Carol describes a recognisably modern Christmas dinner with goose or turkey, Christmas pudding, oranges, chestnuts, and punch. Soyer set up soup kitchens in Dublin during the Great Famine of Ireland, and improved hospital catering with Florence Nightingale in the Crimean War. Street food in Victorian England grew to include fish and chips, tripe, whelks, and pea soup. Tea became cheap, joining white bread in the diet of the poor, who suffered widely from rickets, caused by vitamin D deficiency. New foods such as mangoes, pineapples, and rhubarb became available to the middle classes. Curry arrived from British India, along with Indian restaurants.

Dickson Wright characterises the Edwardian era with the overindulged "Tum Tum", alias King Edward VII, who enjoyed sailing, horses, food, and mistresses. She explains Edwardian country house weekends, with soup, game pies, jellies, trifles, shooting, and bed-hopping. Richard D'Oyly Carte staged operettas and founded the Savoy Hotel in 1889, introducing the rich to haute cuisine, cooked simply. George Orwell's 1937 The Road to Wigan Pier describes the food of the poor, who lived on "white bread and margarine, corned beef, sugared tea and potatoes." The Second World War, with rationing and austerity, was a time when many popular foods like bananas and chocolate could not be had; equally, people were forced to eat unfamiliar foods, such as spam, dried egg, and whale meat. Ironically, the population was healthier than ever before, as rationing provided enough for the poorest. Postwar, Fanny Cradock and her husband Johnnie presented cookery as television entertainment. After the war, many suggestions for a "perfect meal" were made, varying wildly from pizza to curry, chow mein or roast beef and Yorkshire pudding. The 1970s favoured prawn cocktail, cheese fondue, and Black Forest gateau; the 1990s "embraced sushi". Cookery writers from Elizabeth David to Delia Smith encouraged people to enjoy simple, well-cooked ingredients. Henrietta Green championed local produce and farmers' markets.

The book ends with an appendix of historical recipes; Dickson Wright lists the ingredients and recipes in modern terms for 18 dishes, from the 13th century spiced wine custard, to the 16th century capon with orange sauce, the 18th century mackerel with fennel and mint, and the 19th century macaroni à la Reine. There is a bibliography and an index.

=== Editions ===
- A History of English Food. London: Random House. 2011. ISBN 978-1-905-21185-2.

== Reception ==
Several reviewers broadly agreed that A History of English Food was informative, witty, and entertaining, though others found it unsystematic and snobbish.

It was described by Christopher Hirst in The Independent as "surely destined for classic status". The reviewer remarked Dickson Wright's mention of badger hams in the West Country pubs of her childhood, and the nine sorts of tripe in Dewsbury market, "including penis and udder".

Jane Shilling, writing in The Daily Telegraph, calls the book "magnificently eccentric and robustly informative", admitting that it is mainly digression, "from Victorian fruit-growing via Rudyard Kipling's poem 'The Glory of the Garden' to her theory that Kipling was never made Poet Laureate because Queen Victoria objected to his lines about 'the Widow at Windsor/With a hairy gold crown on 'er 'ead'". Shilling finds this "an impressive tour" from a well-stocked mind. She describes Dickson Wright's approach as "a firmly chronological line across the landscape of culinary history, pausing at intervals to examine objects of interest." She agrees that the book is "opinionated and wildly idiosyncratic", in the tradition of W.N.W. Fowler's "gin-soaked" Countryman's Cooking and Rupert Croft-Cooke's English Cooking: A New Approach. The book gives, Shilling asserts, a "glorious" impression of English cuisine's long and continuous development since the Middle Ages. The result is in her view "engaging, funny and admirably entertaining."

Fay Maschler, writing in The Spectator, calls the book a "less stringent, more capricious, generously illustrated account", giving the reader "a magical sense of almost having been there". For her, the book works because of Dickson Wright's evident enthusiasm for food and farming, especially animals. She comments that while the book presents little that is genuinely surprising, it is rich in interesting details; its weakness is an excess of unsupported "suppositions and fancies." In Maschler's view, Dickson Wright brings the book to life when she speaks from personal experience to compare "the taste of swan, moorhen and rook", or writes of her delight in "the unexpectedly white meat of beaver tail", or recalls from her childhood "when local sturgeon were for sale, rough boys sold live eels along Hammersmith Mall".

David Evans, reviewing the book for The Independent, calls it "deliciously rich and moreish", commenting that "what might have been a dry academic exercise is enlivened by her eccentric, opinionated interjections (if you can ignore the slightly snobbish tone)." Evans adds that Dickson Wright gives the impression of having tried everything; she found seal meat "disgusting".

Rachel Cooke, reviewing A History of English Food for The Guardian, writes that she feels "pretty cross. All of the information in this book can be found elsewhere, and much better done, too." She compares the book unfavourably with Kate Colquhoun's 2008 Taste: The Story of Britain Through Its Cooking and Dorothy Hartley's 1954 "classic" Food in England. Cooke argues that Dickson Wright is "as particular as she is greedy", and "gruesomely snobbish", out of touch with "other people", preferring therefore the overindulgent Georgians who could afford a suitable retinue of servants.

British Food in America describes the book as "a stinker", substituting "speculation and snobbish reminiscence for any modicum of research or analysis."

== Sources ==
- Dickson Wright, Clarissa (2011). A History of English Food. London: Random House Books. ISBN 978-1-905211-85-2. OCLC 751745454.
