= Omali =

Omali may refer to:

- Om Ali, an Egyptian desert
- Omala, Greece
