= The Cooks and Confectioners Dictionary =

Cookbook by John Nott

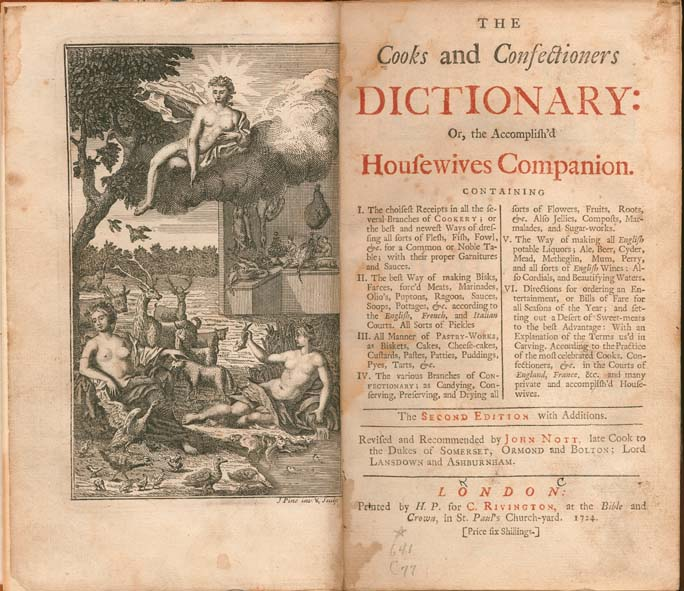
- Frontispiece and title page of 2nd edition
- Author: John Nott
- Subject: Cookery
- Publisher: Charles Rivington
- Publication date: 1723
- Publication place: England
- Pages: 646

The Cooks and Confectioners Dictionary: or, the Accomplish'd Housewives Companion was a cookery book written by John Nott and first published in London in 1723.

== Context ==
Nott had been the chief cook for a string of aristocrats, named on the title page of his book as the Dukes of Somerset, Ormond, and Bolton, and the Lords Lansdowne and Ashburnham.

== Book ==
=== Contents ===
The book describes how to make savoury dishes including "Bisks, Farces, forc'd Meats, Marinades, Olio's, Puptons, Ragoos, Sauces, Soops, Pottages". Pastries include biscuits, cakes, custards, puddings, pies and tarts. Confectionery includes candying and conserving flowers, fruits, and roots, as well as jellies, marmalades and decorative "sugar-works". Drinks include the making of lemonade, beer, cider, mead, perry and English wines, as well as cordials. The book ends with a list of suggested bills of fare for every month of the year.

The book is prefaced with a four-page Introduction "To All Good Housewives", beginning "Worthy Dames, Were it not for the sake of Custom, which has made it as unfashionable for a Book to come abroad without an Introduction, as for a Man to appear at Church without a Neckcloth, or a Lady without a Hoop-petticoat, I should not have troubled you with this." (Note: This memorably humorous start was boldly plagiarised by Eliza Smith four years later in her The Compleat Housewife.) The introduction ends with "Your humble Servant, The Compiler". There follows "Some Divertisements in Cookery, us'd at Festival-Times, as Twelfth-Day, &c."

The main text is laid out as a dictionary from Al to Zest. It included items now unfamiliar, such as Battalia Pye of Fish, a "very large Pye, and cut with Battlements ... with as many Towers as will contain your several sorts of Fish", which included salmon, cockles, prawns, oysters, and periwinkles.

This is followed by Bills of Fare, Terms of Art for Carving, Instructions for Carving, The Manner of Setting out a Desert of Fruits and Sweet-meats, and the Alphabetical Index.

=== Approach ===
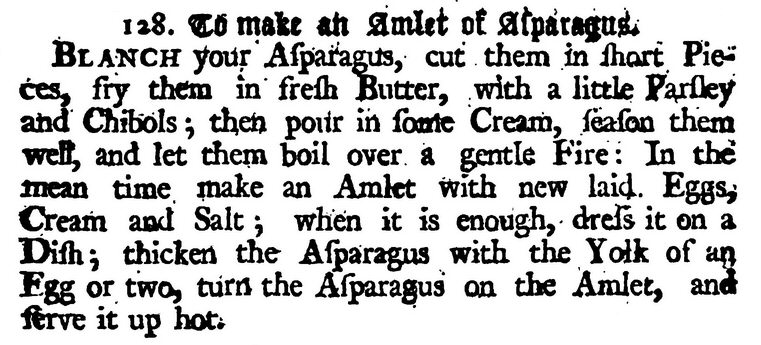
Recipe "To make an Amlet of Asparagus" in John Nott's The Cooks and Confectioners Dictionary, 1723

Since the main text is an alphabetical list, there are no sections, and the recipes stand alone without instructions on kitchen equipment or general comments on types of dish.

The entries are named, either like "Asparagus with Butter" as dishes, or like "To make an Amlet of Asparagus" as goals to be attained. The ingredients are not listed. Quantities, if mentioned at all, are simply included in the text, as "an Egg or two", relying on the cook's judgement as to the exact quantity needed. Cooking conditions are similarly mentioned only in passing, as "over a gentle Fire". For example:

To make an Amlet of Asparagus

Blanch your Asparagus, cut them in short Pieces, fry them in fresh Butter, with a little Parsley and Chibols; then pur in some Cream, season them well, and let them boil over a gentle Fire: In the mean time make an Amlet with new laid Eggs, Cream, and Salt; when it is enough, dress it on a Dish; thicken the Asparagus with the Yolk of an Egg or two, turn the Asparagus on the Amlet, and serve it up hot.

=== Editions ===
- First edition, 1723, C. Rivington, London. Transcript

--- reprinted 1980, Lawrence Rivington, London. Introduction and glossary by Elizabeth David
--- reprinted 2012, Rare Books Club.

- Second edition, 1724, C. Rivington, London. With additions
- Third edition, 1726, C. Rivington, London. With additions

--- reprinted 2005, Thomson Gale, Farmington Hills, Michigan

- Fourth edition, 1733. C. Rivington, London.

== Reception ==
Nott's recipe for hot chocolate is said to be delicious. The bibliographer William Carew Hazlitt, in his 1902 Old Cookery Books, considered Nott well-read and intelligent as he drew his recipes from many sources at home and abroad, including "to dress mutton the Turkish way".

Nott's "Queen's Pottage" is recreated at The Gilbert Scott restaurant, though The Telegraph notes that the chef, Marcus Wareing, omits the original cockscombs. Nott's Salmagundy is likewise reworked by Heston Blumenthal in his Dinner restaurant.

The Oxford Companion to Sugar and Sweets notes that the "ubiquitous" crème brûlée appeared in the Dictionary, but that Elizabeth David had traced Nott's version to François Massialot's recipe in his 1691 Cuisinier royal et bourgeois, rendered as "Burnt Cream" in the English translation of his book, The Court and Country Cook of 1702. The Colonial Williamsburg Foundation comments that Nott seems to have plagiarized "heavily" from Robert May as well as Massialot, without explanation.
