= Mumma (drink) =

Swedish festive mixed drink made with beer and sweet soda

- Type: Beer cocktail
- Origin: Sweden
- Ingredients: Dark beer (often porter or stout); light lager; sweet carbonated drink such as sockerdricka or Julmust; optionally fortified wine (port, sherry or Madeira), spirits (e.g. gin or brännvin), cardamom, and sugar syrup

Mumma is a traditional Swedish mixed drink commonly associated with the Christmas buffet (julbord). It is typically made by combining dark beer with a sweet carbonated beverage, sometimes with the addition of fortified wine; versions may also be spiced (often with cardamom) or lightly strengthened with spirits such as gin or brännvin. (Note: In Swedish usage mumma today most often refers to a sweet mixture of dark beer and sockerdricka, sometimes with fortified wine, spirits and spices.)

== History and etymology ==
The word mumma has been used in Swedish since the 16th century, initially referring to the imported German beer Brunswick Mum (Braunschweiger Mumme), a dark, strong beer from Braunschweig. Historical Swedish sources distinguish varieties such as Stadtmumme and the stronger Schiffsmumme. Over time, Swedish usage broadened so that mumma could mean a sweet dark beer in general and later a mixed beer-based drink sweetened and sometimes spiced or fortified. In figurative Swedish, det är mumma means “that is delicious/wholesome.”

== Preparation and variations ==
Modern mumma recipes vary by household and region. Common elements include a base of dark beer (often porter) blended with a sweet carbonated drink such as sockerdricka (sometimes Julmust or a light lager is used), with optional additions of fortified wine (e.g. port, sherry or Madeira). Some versions add a small measure of gin or brännvin, season with ground cardamom, and sweeten with cooled sugar syrup rather than granulated sugar. The drink is usually served chilled in a jug during the Christmas season. (Note: Wine or spirits are not essential; the mixture is traditionally adjusted to taste.)

== In language and culture ==
The popularity of mumma in Sweden is reflected in phrases such as smaka mumma (“taste good”) and det är mumma (för x) (“it is good for x”).

== See also ==
- Brunswick Mum
- Swedish cuisine
- Glögg
- Sockerdricka
