= The Compleat Housewife =

Book by Eliza Smith

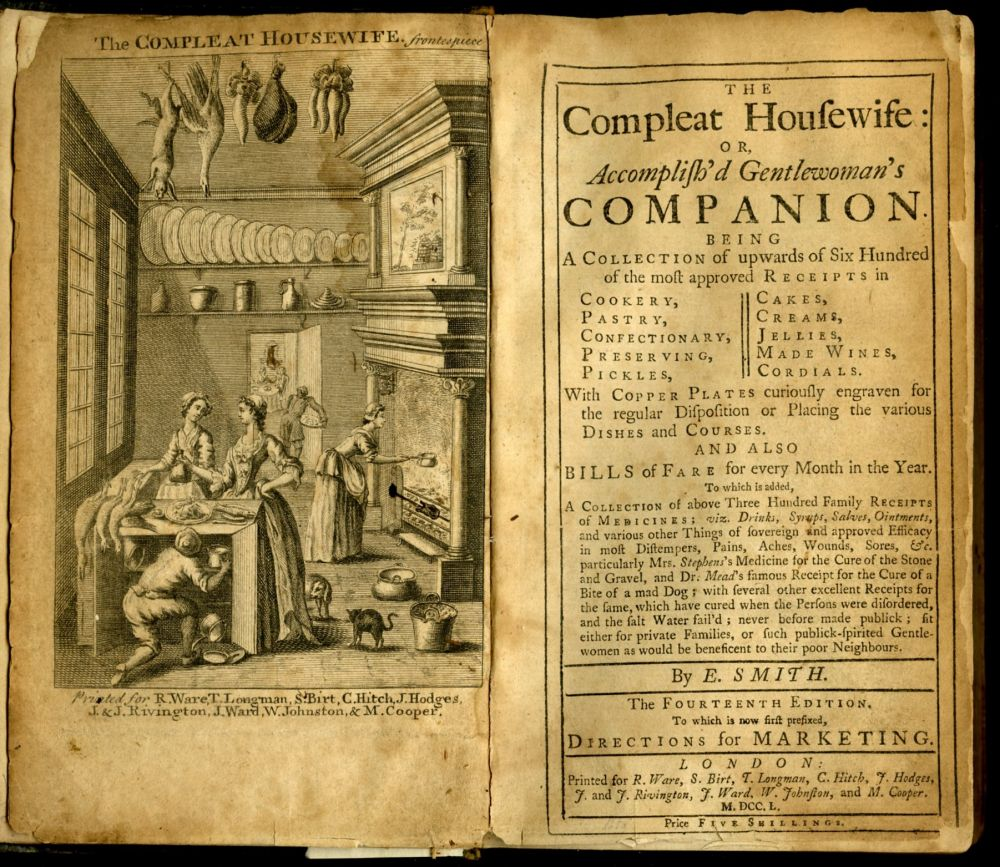
- Frontispiece and title page of 14th edition, 1750
- Author: Eliza Smith
- Subject: English cooking
- Genre: Cookery
- Publisher: J. Pemberton
- Publication date: 1727
- Publication place: England

The Compleat Housewife; or, Accomplish'd Gentlewoman's Companion is a cookery book written by Eliza Smith and first published in London in 1727. It became popular, running through 18 editions in fifty years.

It was the first cookery book to be published in the Thirteen Colonies of America: it was printed in Williamsburg, Virginia, in 1742. It contained the first published recipe for "katchup", and appears to be the earliest source for bread and butter pudding.

The book includes recipes not only for foods but for wines, cordial-waters, medicines and salves.

== Book ==
The title page describes The Compleat Housewife as a

collection of several hundred of the most approved receipts, in cookery, pastry, confectionery, preserving, pickles, cakes, creams, jellies, made wines, cordials. And also bills of fare for every month of the year. To which is added, a collection of nearly two hundred family receipts of medicines; viz. drinks, syrups, salves, ointments, and many other things of sovereign and approved efficacy in most distempers, pains, aches, wounds, sores, etc. never before made publick in these parts; fit either for private families, or such publick-spirited gentlewomen as would be beneficent to their poor neighbours.

The book was the first to publish a recipe for "Katchup"; it included mushrooms, anchovies and horseradish. The title The Compleat Housewife may owe something to Gervase Markham's 1615 The English Huswife.

Little is known of Smith beyond what she writes of herself in the preface. She spent her life working as a cook or housekeeper in wealthy households, and unlike Elizabeth Raffald who left service to run her own shop, continued in that profession despite the success of her book. It is possible that she worked at Beaulieu Abbey, Hampshire. She is critical of cookery books written by men who conceal their secrets, preventing readers from using their recipes successfully.

The preface contains the following passage:

It being grown as fashionable for a book now to appear in public without a preface, as for a lady to appear at a ball without a hoop-petticoat, I shall conform to the custom for fashion-sake and not through any necessity. The subject being both common and universal, needs no argument to introduce it, and being so necessary for the gratification of the appetite, stands in need of no encomiums to allure persons to the practice of it; since there are but a few nowadays who love not good eating and drinking

The passage was lightly adapted from an earlier book with a similar title, John Nott's The Cooks and Confectioners Dictionary: or, the Accomplish’d Housewife’s Companion (1723), which declared he had added an introduction because fashion had made it as odd for a book to be printed without one as for a man to be seen "in church without a neck cloth or a lady without a hoop-petticoat."

=== Contents ===
The following refer to the 9th edition, 1739.

- Preface
- A Bill of Fare for every Season of the Year.
- Cookery, &c. Page 1. [Soups, meats, pies, pickles, fish, hams, sausages, cheese]
- All Sorts of Pickles. Page 78.
- All Sorts of Puddings. Page 100.
- All Sorts of Pastry. Page 122.
- All Sorts of Cakes. Page 144.
- Creams and Jellies. Page 160.
- Preserves, Conserves, and Syrups. Page 173.
- All Sorts of Made Wines. Page 213.
- All Sorts of Cordial-waters. Page 232.
- Medicines and Salves. Page 272.

=== Approach ===
Smith offers no general advice, either at the start of the book or at the start of chapters; each chapter consists entirely of recipes. There are no lists of ingredients, these simply being mentioned as needed in the recipes. Most recipes do not mention either oven temperature or cooking time, though for example "To candy Orange Flowers" instructs "set your glasses in a stove with a moderate heat", and "To Stew a Rump of Beef" states "this requires six or seven hours stewing."

The recipes are predominantly English, but dishes include French and other foreign names, and imported ingredients, such as spices.

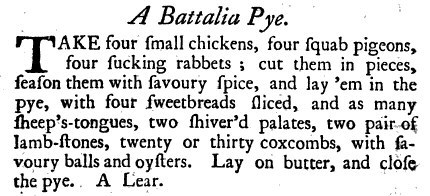
Recipe for battalia pye from Eliza Smith's The Compleat Housewife, 9th edition, 1739

Recipes are described tersely, and do not generally spell out basic techniques such as how to make pastry; the recipe for "A Battalia Pye" (Note: The name means a pie filled with beatilles, small blessed objects (Latin beatus, blessed) such as, according to the Oxford English Dictionary, "Cocks-combs, Goose-gibbets, Ghizzards, Livers, and other Appurtenances of Fowls (1706)". It is not connected with Italian battaglia, battle.) does not mention pastry at all, though it is called for with the instruction to "close the pye":

A Battalia Pye
Take four small chickens, four squab pigeons, four sucking rabbets; cut them in pieces, season them with savoury spice, and lay 'em in the pye, with four sweetbreads sliced, and as many sheep's tongues, two shiver'd palates, (Note: Bones were cooked to add flavour and to release gelatine.) two pair of lamb-stones, twenty or thirty coxcombs, with savoury balls and oysters. Lay on butter, and close the pye. A Lear.

However, a few frequently-used components of dishes are described, such as "A Lear for Savoury Pyes" and "A Ragoo for made Dishes". The "Lear" is a thickened sauce made with claret, gravy, "oyster liquor", anchovies, herbs, onion and butter. The "Ragoo" contains similar ingredients, with the addition of sliced meats and mushrooms; the recipe ends with "use it when called for", such as in the Battalia Pye.

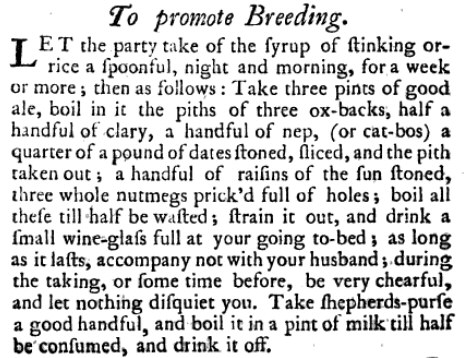
Recipe "To Promote Breeding"

Recipes are provided for home-made medicines and remedies such as "To promote Breeding" for women wanting to become pregnant. The recipe calls for a spoonful of "stinking orrice" (Note: Stinking iris, Iris foetidissima.) syrup to be taken night and morning, and for "good ale" to be boiled with "the piths of 3 ox-backs, (Note: Spinal cords.) half a handful of clary, a handful of nep (or cat-bos)", (Note: Common catnip, Nepeta cataria or catmint, Nepeta mussinii.) dates, raisins, and nutmegs. The woman drinking this mixture "at your going to-bed" is enjoined "as long as it lasts, accompany not with your husband."

== Publication ==
=== Britain ===
The book was first published in 1727 and ran through 18 editions by 1773. The first four editions were published under the byline "E— S—", but Smith did reveal she was a woman "constantly employed in fashionable and noble Families ... for the Space of thirty Years and upwards". The fifth edition of 1732 gave the author's name as "E. Smith".

The bibliographer William Carew Hazlitt recorded that the 7th edition included "near fifty Receipts being communicated just before the author's death".

=== America ===
The Compleat Housewife was the first cookery book to be published in America, when William Parks, an ambitious and enterprising printer (originally from Shropshire) printed it in Williamsburg, Virginia in 1742. His version of The Compleat Housewife, a "cookery book of ambitious scope", was based on the fifth London edition of 1732, altered to suit American taste, and without recipes "the ingredients or materials for which are not to be had in this country." Copies of the 1742 edition have become very rare, but "happily, one copy has returned to the city of its origin", and is in the Library of Colonial Williamsburg, Incorporated.

== Reception ==
In 1893, the bibliographer William Carew Hazlitt allocated 54 pages of his history of cookery books to the Compleat Housewife, commenting that "the highly curious contents of E. Smith ... may be securely taken to exhibit the state of knowledge in England upon this subject in the last quarter of the seventeenth and the first quarter of the eighteenth [century]".

Christine Mitchell, reviewing the Chawton House reprint in 2010 for the Jane Austen Society of North America, wrote that Eliza Smith's book "met the growing need for a text to assist women with their task of maintaining a household." She quotes Elizabeth Wallace's introduction as saying that it gives modern readers reason to appreciate having a refrigerator and a global food system that brings us out-of-season produce. Yet, she observes, the English housewife had many varieties of vegetables, 30 kinds of seafood and 35 kinds of poultry (including hares and rabbits). She notes that the book also describes home remedies, the housewife having to function as " chef, doctor, pharmacist, exterminator, chemist, laundress, and all-around handy-woman." Reflecting that the recipes would "probably never" be used today, and the medicines are useless, the book remains invaluable for researchers, gives readers a glimpse into the world of Jane Austen and her contemporaries, and richly documents eighteenth-century English life.

Patrick Spedding, in Script & Print, notes that the book was very popular in the eighteenth century, with 20 London editions in fifty years. However, he roundly criticises the 1983 Arlon House facsimile reprint of the 16th edition for deliberately omitting recipes including "To promote Breeding", suggesting this was because the publisher was concerned they might be harmful.

The historian Sandra Sherman comments that The Compleat Housewife "is the first female-authored blockbuster."

The bibliographer Genevieve Yost comments that "E. Smith's popularity in eighteenth century England was challenged perhaps most seriously by Hannah Glasse, who admittedly is better remembered today", adding at once that Glasse is recalled mainly for the controversy over whether she actually existed, and for the recipe that people supposed started with "First catch your hare." Yost suggests that the book's popularity in the colonies was probably increased by the publication of an American edition. She concludes that

The quantities and ingredients render many of the recipes unsuitable to the modern kitchen, but these old cookbooks are increasing in value and interest to libraries, bibliophiles, and collectors, who find in them a truly revealing and fascinating glimpse of the past.

In the Spring 2006 issue of Prairie Schooner, Sarah Kennedy published a poem called "The Compleat Housewife, 1727", with the gloss "the first popular cookbook published in Great Britain". The poem begins:

Learning to thigh a pigeon or tame a crab
was now within any woman's grasp,
even a maid could be taught to carve.

== Editions ==
- 1st edition, London: J. Pemberton, 1727.
- 2nd edition, London: J. Pemberton, 1728.
- 3rd edition, London: J. Pemberton, 1729. Corrected and improved.
- 4th edition, London: J. Pemberton, 1730. Corrected and improved.
- 5th edition, London: J. Pemberton, 1732. With very large additions.

--- Reprinted Williamsburg, VA: W. Parks, 1742.

- 6th edition, London: J. Pemberton, 1734. With very large additions.
- 7th edition, London: J. and J. Pemberton, 1736. With very large additions.
- 8th edition, London: J. and J. Pemberton, 1737.
- 9th edition, London: 1739. J. and J. Pemberton, 1739. With very large additions.
- 10th edition, London: J. and H. Pemberton, 1741. With very large additions.
- 11th edition, London: J. and H. Pemberton, 1742. With very large additions.
- 12th edition, London: J. and J. Pemberton, 1744. With very large additions.
- 13th edition, London: H. Pemberton, 1746. With very large additions.

--- reprinted 1747.

- 14th edition, London: R. Ware and others, 1750. Prefixed with directions for marketing.
- 15th edition, London: R. Ware and others, 1753. With additions.

--- London: Literary Services & Production, 1968, 1973.
--- London: Studio Editions, 1994.
--- With introduction by E. K. Wallace. Chawton House Library, 2009.

- 16th edition, London, 17__. With additions.
- 17th edition, London, 17__.
- 18th edition, London, 1773.
