= Beef and Butt Beer, against Mum and Pumpernickle =

1743 English drinking song

"Beef and Butt Beer, against Mum and Pumpernickle" was an 8-page drinking song published in 1743 in London.

A protest song published with the specific intent of stirring up trouble for the King, at the time George II of Great Britain who, like his father George I of Great Britain was originally from Germany, the song was anti-German and pro-Jacobite.

In one of the verses of the song "Calvert’s Butt" is compared as a crystal clear alternative to "Muddy Mum". The drinkers of the day would have recognized Calvert as one of the main producers of porter beer, while Muddy Mum was a German style of wheat beer flavored with herbs and, as the term 'muddy' implies, thought of as less pure than the English porter.
