= Bread and butter pudding =

Traditional sweet British pudding

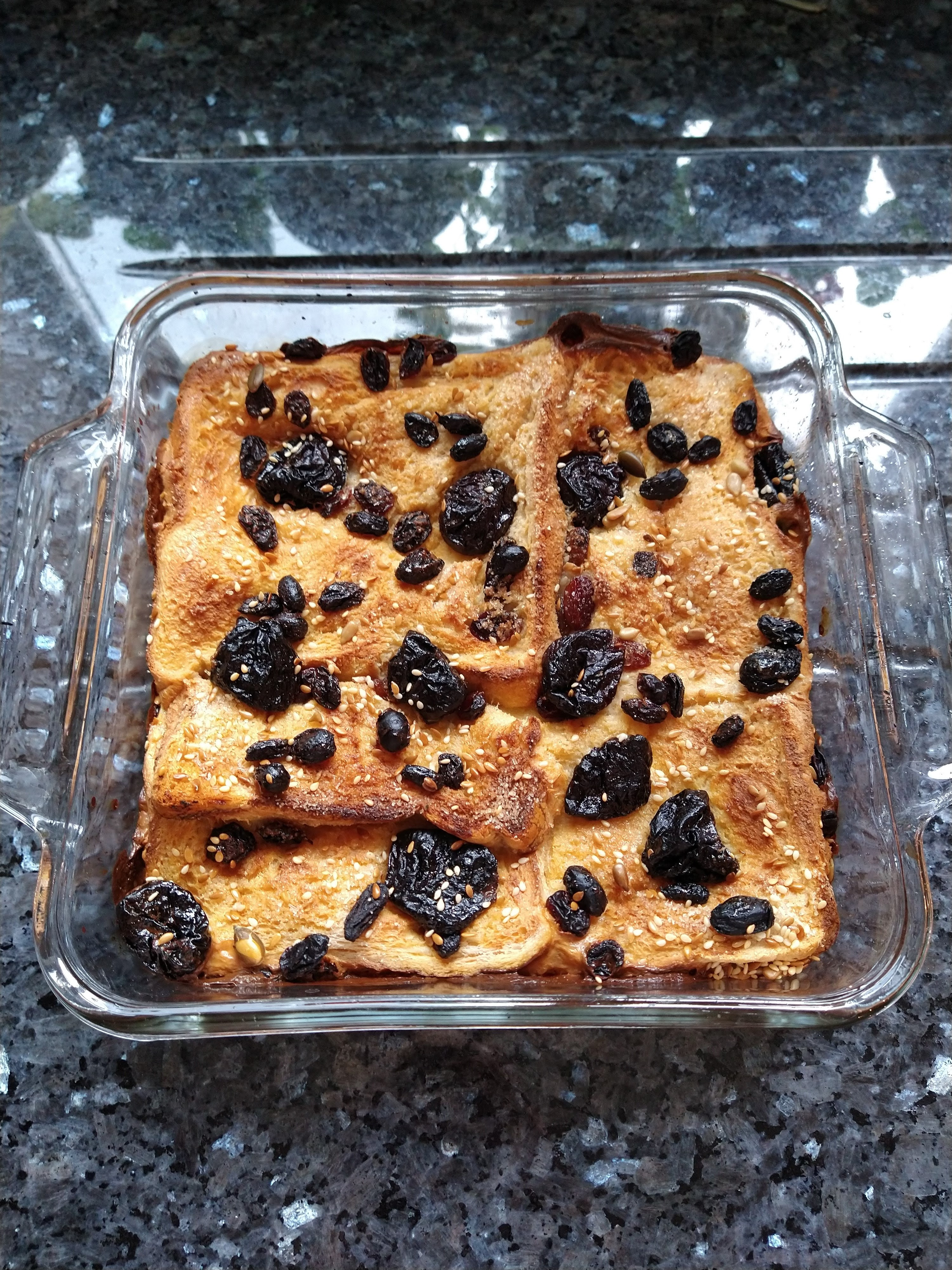
- Alternative names: Whitepot
- Type: Pudding
- Place of origin: United Kingdom
- Main ingredients: Buttered bread, raisins, egg, milk or cream, nutmeg

Bread and butter pudding is a bread pudding in British cuisine. Slices of buttered bread scattered with raisins are layered in an oven dish, covered with an egg custard mixture seasoned with nutmeg, vanilla, cinnamon, or other spices, and then baked.

== Variations ==
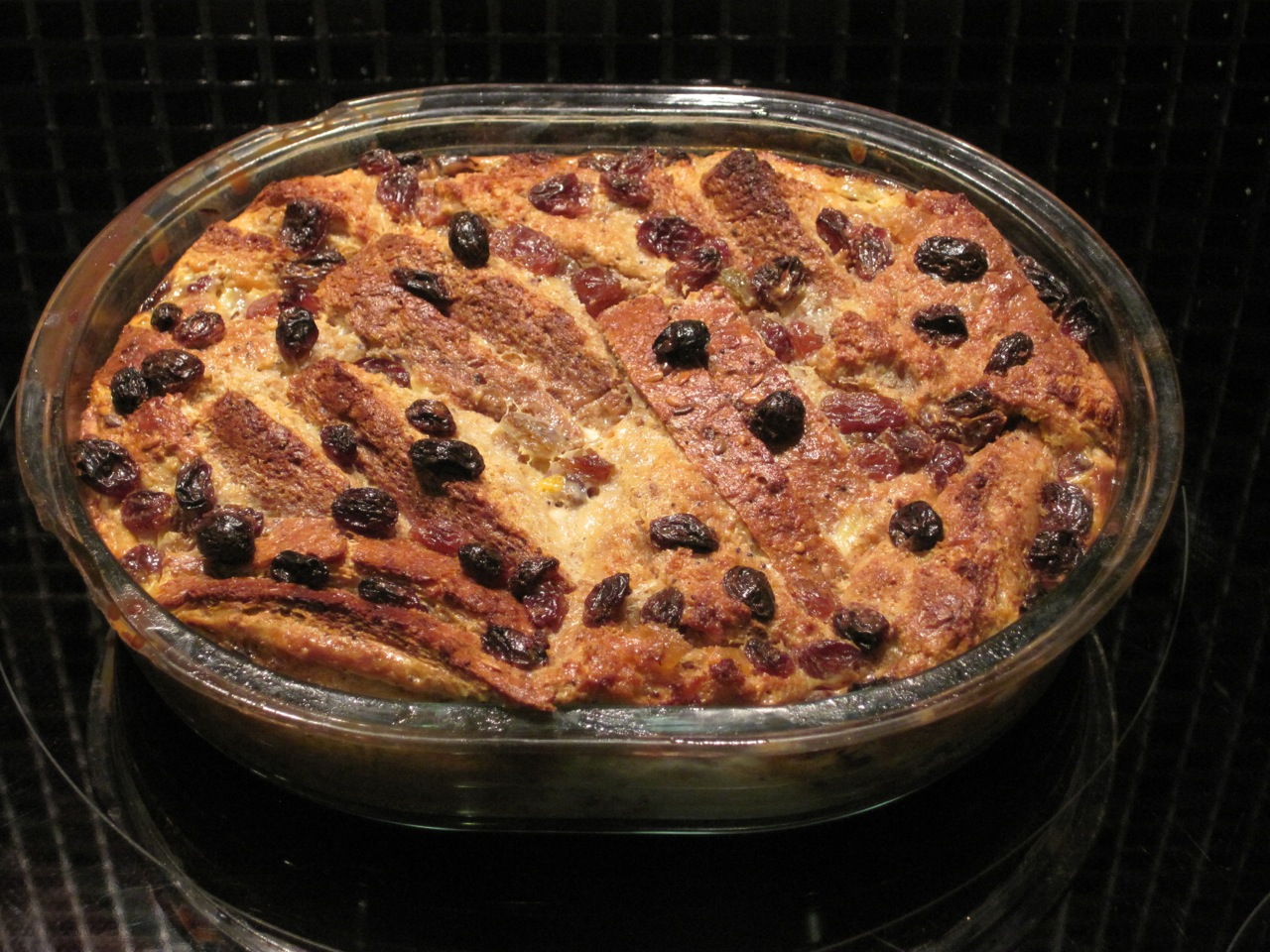
Brown bread and butter pudding

In addition to being baked with custard, the pudding may be served with additional custard or cream. Sometimes raspberry, strawberry, blackberry or mixed fruit jam, marmalade, or other sweet preserves will be spread upon the bread, along with the butter. Other modern variations include scattering fresh grapes between the layers of bread, melting apples into the egg-milk mixture, and using unusual types of breads, such as brioche, to make it. It is usual to use stale bread.

== History ==
The earliest bread and butter puddings were called whitepot and used either bone marrow or butter. Whitepots could also be made using rice instead of bread, giving rise to rice pudding in British cuisine.

One of the earliest published recipes for a bread and butter pudding so named is found in Eliza Smith's The Compleat Housewife of 1728. She instructs "Take a two penny loaf, and a pound of fresh butter; spread it in very thin slices, as to eat; cut them off as you spread them, and stone half a pound of raisins, and wash a pound of currants; then put puff-paste at the bottom of a dish, and lay a row of your bread and butter, and strew a handful of currants, a few raisins, and some little bits of butter, and so do till your dish is full; then boil three pints of cream and thicken it when cold with the yolks of ten eggs, a grated nutmeg, a little salt, near half a pound of sugar, and some orange flower-water; pour this in just as the pudding is going into the oven".

Some recipes call for a simple meringue to be made from the leftover egg whites and sugar which is spread over a layer of jam or preserves on the top of the pudding after it has come from the oven. The meringue is cooked until it is slightly browned on top. This dessert changes name to "The Queen's Pudding".

In 1845, Eliza Acton suggests giving "a good flavour of lemon-rind and bitter almonds, or of cinnamon, if preferred, to a pint of new milk", then adding cream and sugar, thickened with beaten eggs. Her recipe also calls for a glass of brandy to be added to the mixture.

In American cuisine it may be called "Cold Bread Pudding".

A popular dish in Egypt, Om Ali, is made with either bread or pastry, and includes pistachio nuts but no eggs.

== See also ==
- List of bread dishes
- List of butter dishes
