= Banbury cake =

Spiced, oval-shaped, currant-filled pastry

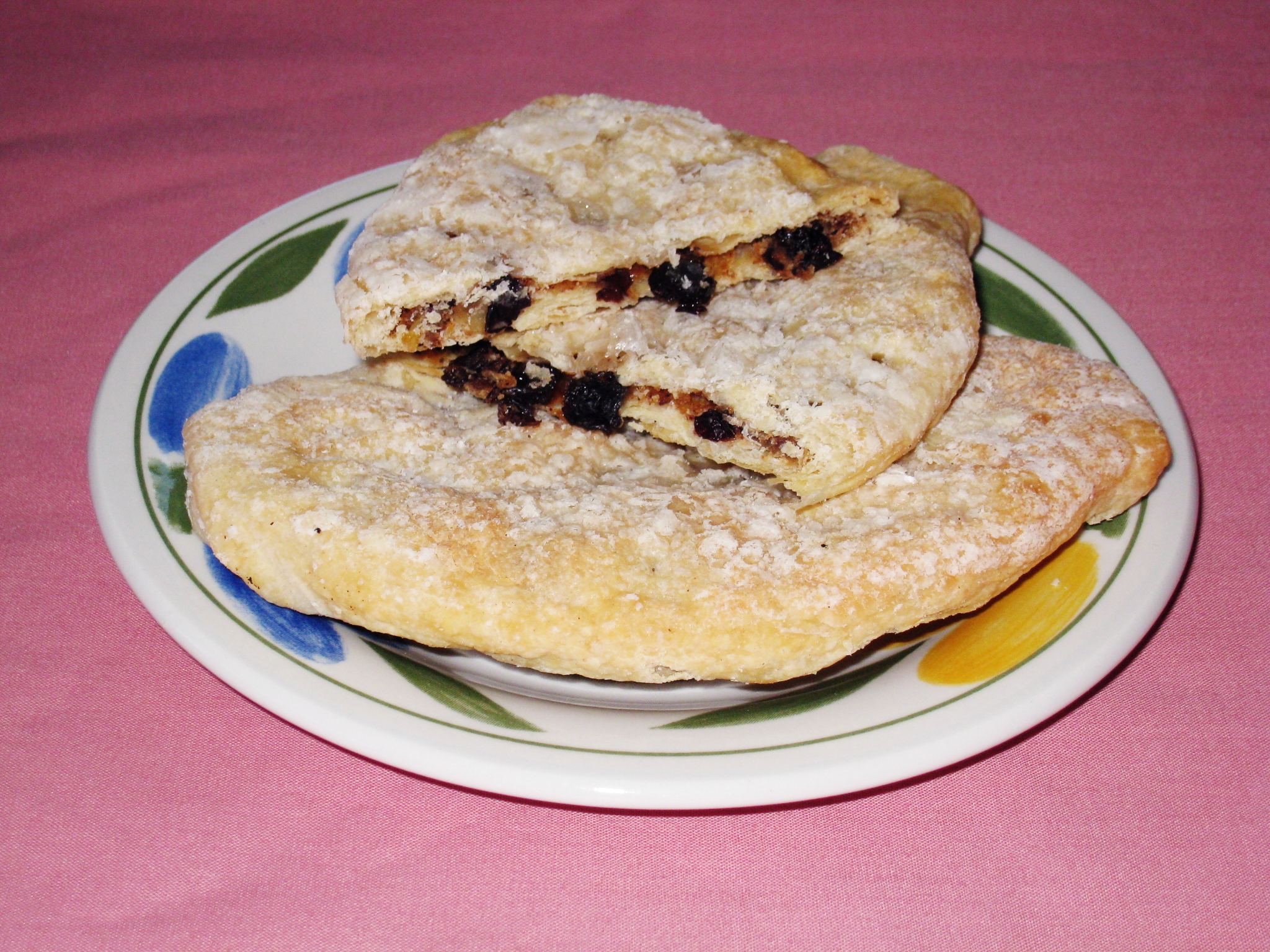
- Two Banbury cakes, one having been cut into two pieces
- Place of origin: England
- Region or state: Banbury, Oxfordshire
- Created by: Edward Welchman
- Main ingredients: Puff pastry, butter, currants, zest, cinnamon, nutmeg

A Banbury cake is a spiced, oval-shaped puff pastry filled with currants. Since the mid-19th century, Banbury cakes have grown increasingly similar to Eccles cakes, but the earlier versions were quite different from the modern pastry. Besides currants, the filling typically includes mixed peel, brown sugar, rum, and nutmeg. Banbury cakes are traditionally eaten with afternoon tea.

Once made and sold exclusively in Banbury, England, Banbury cakes have been made in the region to secret recipes since 1586 and are still made there today, although not in such quantity. The cakes were once sent as far afield as Australia, the East Indies and America, normally in locally made wickerwork baskets. They were sold at rail station refreshment rooms in England.

Banbury cakes were first made by Edward Welchman, whose shop was on Parsons Street. Documented recipes were published by Gervase Markham (in The English Huswife, 1615) and others during the 17th century. These recipes generally differ greatly from the modern idea of a Banbury cake; later recipes are more similar to tarts or turnovers than cakes. An Elizabethan recipe includes flavourings such as ambergris, musk and rose water that are historically used in perfumes and would not be commonly seen in a modern preparation.

Queen Victoria was presented with Banbury cakes on her journey from Osborne to Balmoral each August. The notoriously poorly run 19th-century refreshment rooms at Swindon railway station sold "Banbury cakes and pork pies (obviously stale)". In the novel by Norman Collins, London Belongs to Me, set in 1939, Connie eats a Banbury cake at Victoria Station.

The journal of the Banbury Historical Society, launched in 1959, is titled Cake and Cockhorse ("cockhorse" referring to the nursery rhyme, "Ride a cock horse to Banbury Cross", another association for which the town is well known in the wider world).
