= Game pie =

Savoury pie made with wild game

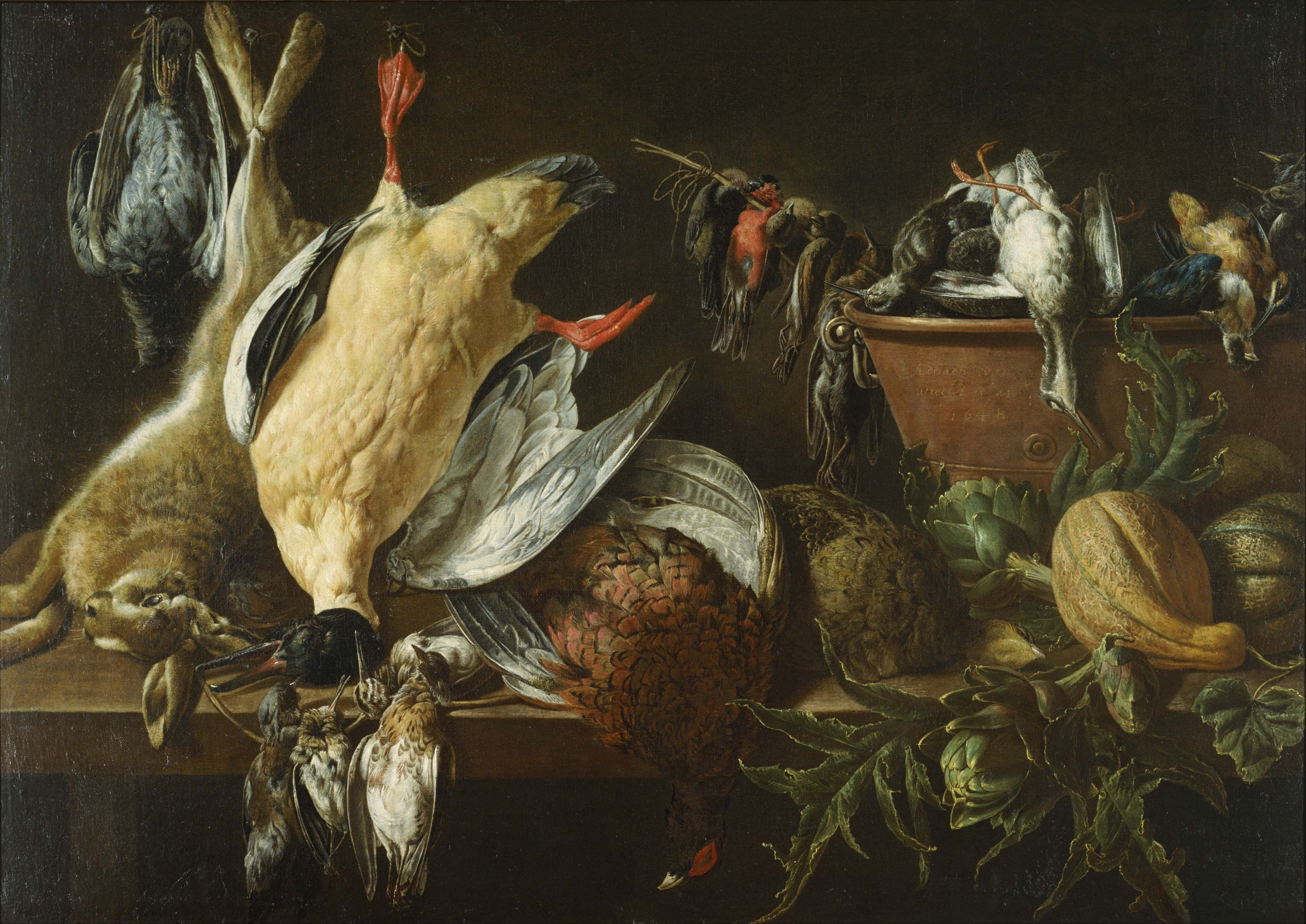
- A still life by Adriaen van Utrecht (1599–1652) showing some of the types of game used in traditional cookery. Note the variety of small birds
- Type: Meat pie
- Place of origin: Roman Empire
- Main ingredients: Game meat (e.g. rabbit, bear, deer, etc.)

Game pie is a form of meat pie featuring game. The dish dates from Roman times when the main ingredients were wild birds and animals such as partridge, pheasant, deer, and hare. The pies reached their most elaborate form in Victorian England, with complex recipes and specialized moulds and serving dishes. Modern versions are simpler but savoury combinations of rabbit, venison, pigeon, pheasant, and other commercially available game.

== Early history ==
Game pies were consumed by the wealthy in the days of the Roman Empire. Wilhelm Adolf Becker states that the emperor Augustus consumed pies that contained chicken, pheasants, pigeon, and duck.

In the Middle Ages, "bake mete" described a pie in which meat or fish is baked with fruit, spices, etc. The meats and sauces were placed in a tough and inedible pastry shell, or "coffin" with a lid sealed on, then baked. There was no pan: the pie shell itself acted as the container. Frequently the pastry was considered superfluous and was discarded. The process of raising the sides of the pie to form a strong protective crust is described in old cookery books as "raising the coffin". The term "mete" referred to the pie, not the meat: a 15th-century cookbook gives a bake mete recipe for a pear custard pie.

Describing the franklin in the 14th-century classic The Canterbury Tales, Chaucer said: "Withoute bake mete was nevere his hous, Of fissh and flessh, and that so plentvous". The best meat might be reserved for the wealthy, while their servants ate inferior pies made of the left-over "umbles" – liver, heart, tripes, and other offal, hence the term "eating humble pie".

In medieval times, birds that might be found in a game pie included heron, crane, crow, swan, stork, cormorant, and bittern as well as smaller birds trapped by nets such as thrushes, starlings, and blackbirds. The 15th-century cookery book Un Vyaunde furnez sanz nom de chare describes a croustade of veal, herbs, dates, and eggs baked in a coffin, but other sources describe croustades of chicken and pigeon. Birds were often placed on top of game pies as ornaments, or 'subtelties', a practice that continued into the Victorian age. An 1890s edition of Mrs Beeton's Book of Household Management shows a game pie topped by a stuffed pheasant.

== Tudor and Stuart periods ==
Through most of the period of the Tudor and Stuart monarchs, roughly from 1500 to 1685, it was common for the rulers and their courtiers to stage elaborate feasts where the attraction was as much the entertainment provided by musicians, comedians, jugglers and acrobats as the food itself. Sometimes the two were combined. Around 1630, at a dinner attended by Charles I, a huge game pie was placed on the table. But when the crust was removed, a dwarf armed with sword and buckler sprang from the coffin. On another occasion, the king was served a surprise pie containing live birds, perhaps the origin of the rhyme "Sing a Song of Sixpence".

The game pies of that period were sweeter than in later times, often containing fruit as well as meat, game and spices. The Tudor Christmas Pie was a rich pie of traditional birds such as partridge, chicken and goose with a recent addition, the turkey, which had been introduced to England from the New World in 1523. Game pie was not restricted to the rich. Until the 1816 Gaming act, country people had the right to catch small game such as rabbits and pigeons to supplement their diet. More valuable game were reserved for the rich, but perhaps not entirely successfully. Shakespeare in The Merry Wives of Windsor alludes to a Venison pasty made from "ill-killed" deer.

== France ==
In 1653, François Pierre La Varenne published his groundbreaking work Le Pâtissier françois. On the frontispiece, is a country kitchen where the cook is making a game pie surrounded by the dead game that would have been included. The Oreiller de la Belle Aurore is an elaborate game pie named after Claudine-Aurore Récamier, the mother of Jean Anthelme Brillat-Savarin. The large square pie, which was one of her son's favorite dishes, contains a variety of game birds and their livers, veal, pork, truffles, aspic, and much else, in puff pastry. It is described in the classic encyclopedia of gastronomy, the Larousse Gastronomique.

== Golden age of game pies in England ==
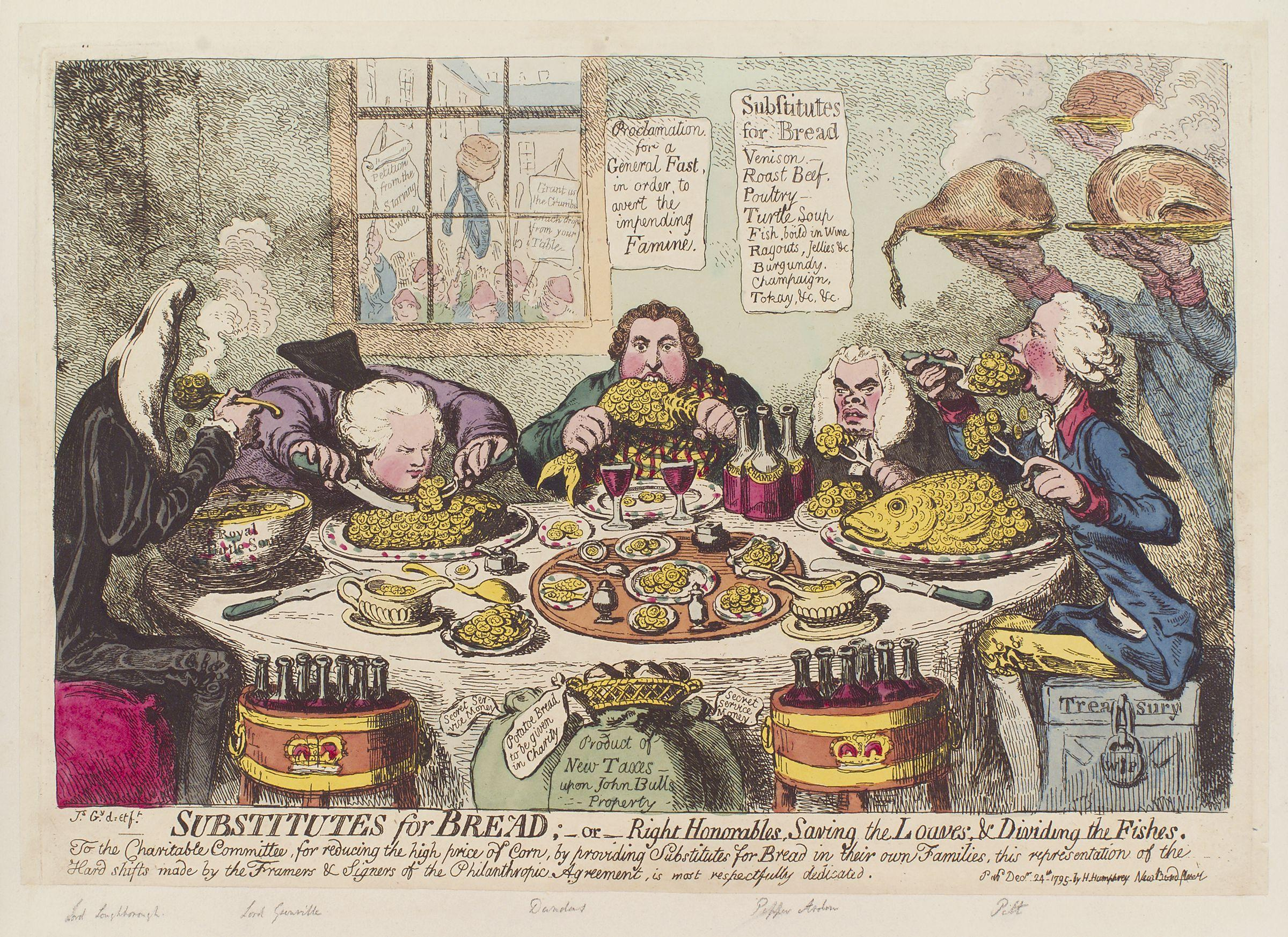
Substitutes for bread; – or – right honorables, saving the loaves, and dividing the fishes. By James Gillray

In the 18th century, game pies prepared for the prosperous gentry could be very elaborate. Hannah Glasse, in her best-selling The Art of Cookery made Plain and Easy, first published in 1747, gave a recipe for a Christmas pie that included pigeon, partridge, a chicken and a goose, all boned and placed one inside the other, and then placed within an enormous turkey. In his 1816 autobiography William Hutton recalls of his maternal grandmother:

She was a careful yet liberal housekeeper, and well skilled in cookery, pastry, and confectionery. I have heard of a pie she raised in the form of a goose trussed for the spit; the real goose was boned; a duck was boned and laid within it; a fowl was boned and laid within the duck; a boned partridge within the fowl; and a boned pigeon within the partridge. The whole having been properly seasoned, the interstices were filled with rich gravy.

Benjamin Disraeli in his novel Venetia describes an English dinner around 1770 that included

...that masterpiece of the culinary art, a great battalia pie, in which the bodies of chickens, pigeons, and rabbits, were embalmed in spices, cock's combs, and savoury balls, and well bedewed with one of those rich sauces of claret, anchovy, and sweet herbs ... [on] the cover of this pastry ... the curious cook had contrived to represent all the once-living forms that were now entombed in that gorgeous sepulchre.

At some point, it became customary for game pies to be served cold. An enormous game pie was made for the Earl of Sefton in the first part of the 19th century to be presented to the corporation of Liverpool. It contained a great variety of game, stuffed one bird within another, as well as truffles, veal, bacon and other ingredients. The meats were first cooked, then cooled with ice and placed in a huge pastry shell with a crust, which was further cooked for three hours. After pouring a hot aspic sauce into the pie through a funnel, it was allowed to cool again for two days before being served cold. The 1845 cookbook The practical cook, English and foreign describes similar game pies of chickens, pigeons, partridges, hares, rabbits, pheasants, gray plovers, grouse, wild fowls or small birds, which may have slices of ham added. With all of these, calf's foot jelly or the bone of a knuckle of veal stewed down to a jelly was added to form aspic when the pie was cooled. The cold pie would then be sliced and served in the same way as its relative, the modern pork pie.

== Moulds and dishes ==
In the second half of the 18th century, potters such as Josiah Wedgwood introduced industrial processes that made it practical to mass-produce glazed pottery containers capable of withstanding the heat of the oven, at relatively low prices. Following a suggestion by Richard Lovell Edgeworth in 1786, Wedgwood started making game pie dishes with an inner liner to hold the contents and an ornamental cover. These were a useful alternative to the traditional pastry coffin, since there were endemic shortages of wheat at this time caused by the early Industrial Revolution coupled with the disruption of trade during the Napoleonic Wars Wedgwood's dishes often had raised bas-relief ornaments of dead game and vine leaves, and a lid handle often modeled on a hare or root vegetable. Some designs gave the illusion of a pastry coffin and lid. William Jesse in his 1844 biography of Beau Brummel says this design was introduced in 1800 when the royal household prohibited the use of flour for pastry in their kitchens, using rice instead.

The invention of the sprung metal pie form made it possible to use a finer pastry than the old-fashioned hot water crust pastry, and also to impart much finer decorative detail to the surface of the pastry. The moulds were sold in many different designs. The potter Herbert Minton introduced Majolica wares in 1851, earthenware ceramics decorated with relief figures and brilliant glazes. Until not long before, only the aristocracy and the gentry had had the right to consume game and there were still many restrictions. Expensive Majolica game pie dishes, draped with images of sumptuous game animals, were used by aspiring middle-class families to signal that they had the wealth or connections to obtain the game that they served to their guests legally rather than through the black market.

== Later Victorians and the 20th century ==
As the Victorian age advanced, the middle classes grew rapidly, with aspirations to a lifestyle that had been reserved to the privileged few. Pioneers such as Alexis Soyer introduced new cooking techniques for the masses based on scientific principles and gas ovens. Mrs. Beeton addressed a broad audience in her 1861 Book of Household Management, giving simple recipes for grouse and partridge pie and for preparing other common game such as wild duck, hare, corn-crake, pheasant, plovers, ptarmigan, quail, venison, etc.

The game pie gradually waned in snob appeal and popularity. In The Mating Season, P.G. Wodehouse notes that Catsmeat Potter-Pirbright once hit the game pie at the Drones six times with six consecutive bread rolls from a seat at the far window. In Vile Bodies, a novel about the period between the first and second world wars, Evelyn Waugh describes the game pie at Shepheard's, a fictional club, as "quite black inside and full of beaks and shot and inexplicable vertebrae".

== Modern variants ==
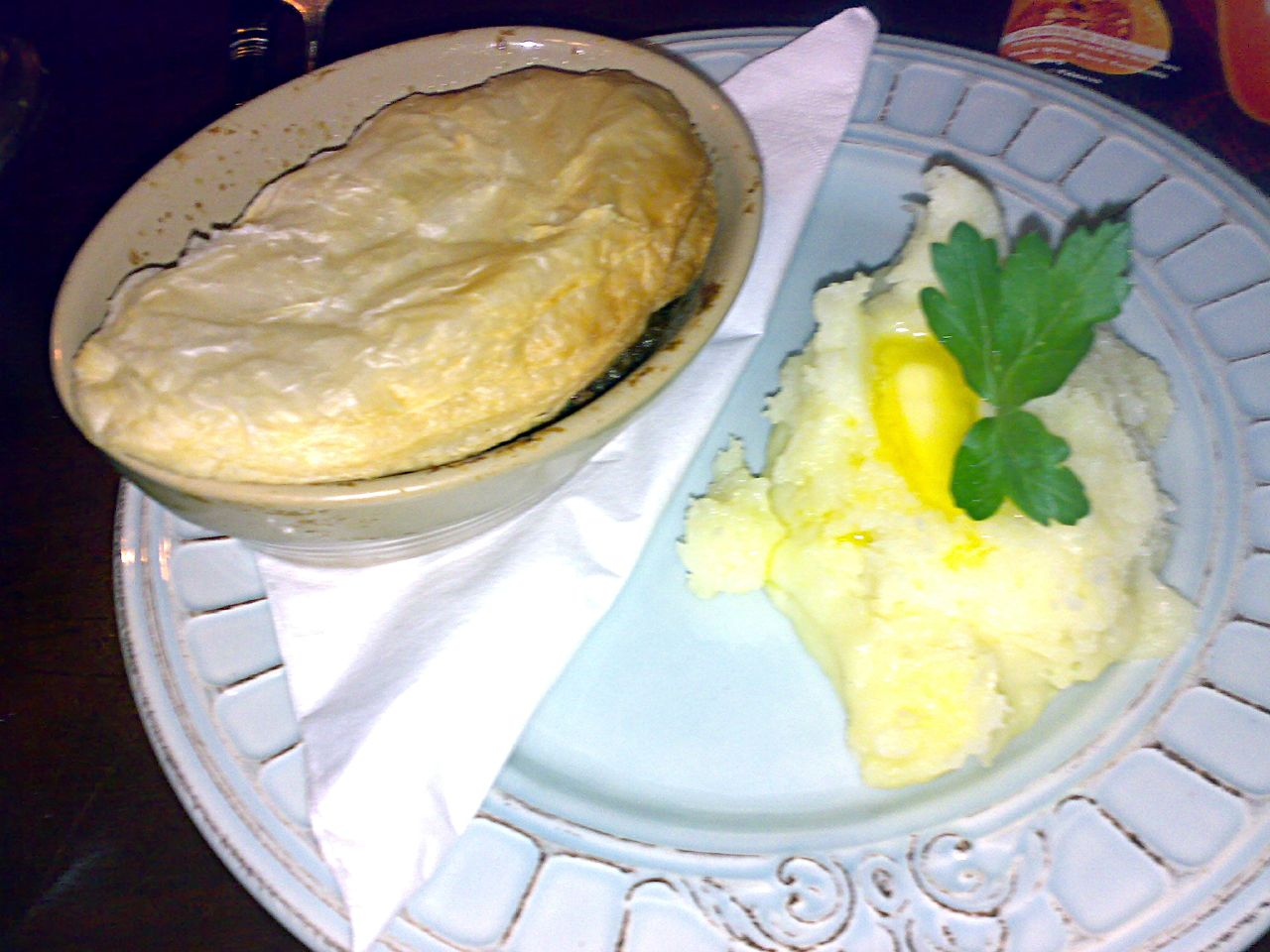
Game pie as served in a cafe in Leith, Edinburgh, Scotland

Many restaurants today serve game pies and there are many modern recipes, but they are usually quite different from the traditional cold game pie. Commonly they contain a savoury stew of commercially available meats such as rabbit and venison, quail and pheasant, but not birds such as pigeons, thrushes, starlings, blackbirds, and crows that were commonly used in the past. They are usually served hot, and may have no shell but only a pastry cover – or in restaurants only a puff-pastry lid added at the last minute.

== See also ==
- Tourtière du Lac Saint-Jean
- List of pies, tarts and flans
