= Brunswick Mum =

German beer

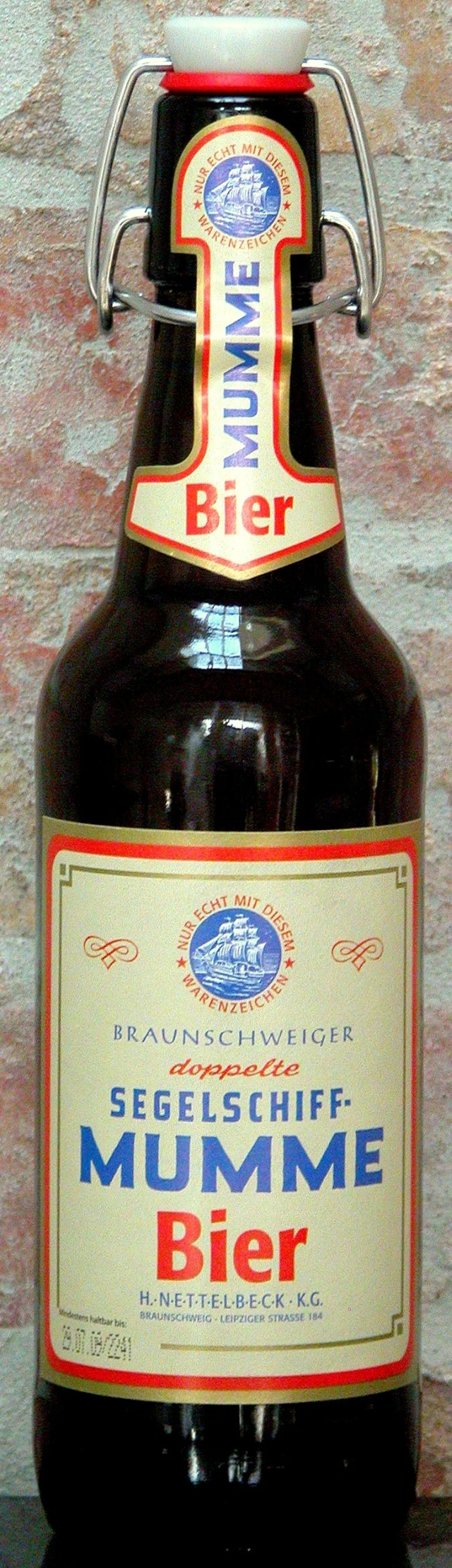
A bottle of Brunswick Mum

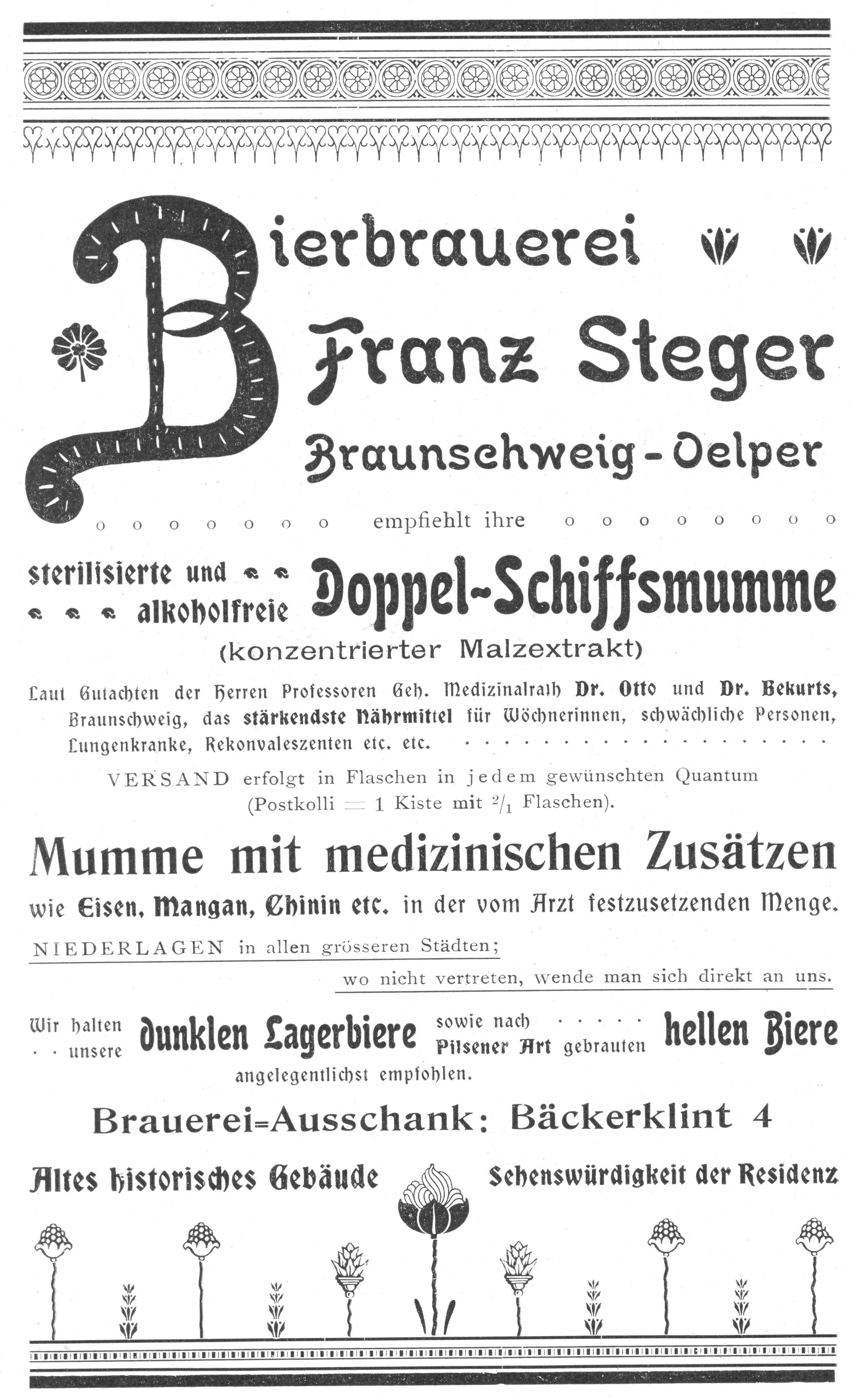
An 1899 advertisement for the Steger Brewery, one of the firms that brewed Brunswick Mum

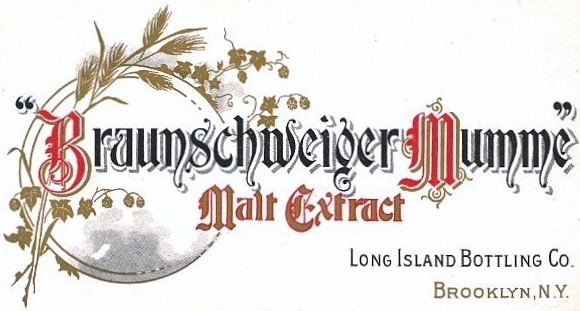
Advertising approx. from around 1900 for Braunschweiger Mumme, bottled in Brooklyn, N.Y.

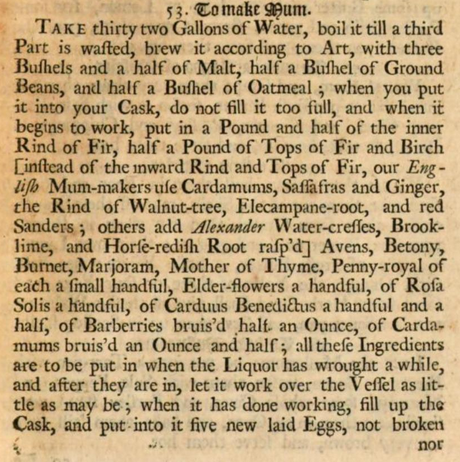
Recipe "To make Mum" in John Nott's The Cooks and Confectioners Dictionary, 1723

Brunswick Mum (German: Braunschweiger Mumme, Latin: Mumma Brunsvicensium or Mumia, French: Mom de Bronsvic), is a dark beer originating from Brunswick in Germany, which ranges from weak to strong depending on the brewing method. It was one of the first black beers recorded in history.

== History ==
Mum originated in the Late Middle Ages. The composition gave the beer a long shelf life that allowed a wide distribution; mum became the most important export from Brunswick and, in the early modern period was shipped to places such as India and the Caribbean. The drink is still sold in Brunswick where since autumn 2008, for the first time in about 200 years, it is produced in alcoholic variants. Nowadays, an alcohol-free malt extract is also sold as doppelte Segelschiff-Mumme.

According to an 18th-century source, a cask of Brunswick mum cost between 40 and 100 rixdollars.

== Composition ==
The 17th-century author David Kellner describes mum as being held in high esteem for its strength, taste and brown color. The three types of mum (Schiff-Mumme, Stadt-Mumme, Erndte-Bier) mentioned by Kellner are solely composed of barley-malt and hops. It is said that the strongest variety had an almost syrupy consistency, known as Schiffsmumme or doppelte Mumme.

In contrast to German sources is mum in English literature from the early modern period an unhopped strong wheat-beer, made with the addition of various aromatic herbs. The oldest English recipe seems to be published 1682 in The Natural History of Coffee, Thee, Chocolate, Tobacco by John Chamberlayne and is said to be recorded in Brunswick.

The recipe calls for seven bushels of wheat-malt, one bushel of oat-malt and one bushel of ground beans to make 63 gallons of mum. Eggs are added to prevent the beer from becoming sour. Variations of this recipe are published by later authors, for instance John Nott. (Note: "Mum, if it be right Brunswick; is a hearty strengthning liquor; and may safely be used sometimes, by such as require strong drink; whose bodies do like, and agree well with it. But our English Mum is not comparable to it; and disparageth the other, being too often sold for Brunswick.")

Elisha Coles in An English Dictionary (1677) states that mum is "a kind of Physical Beer made (originally) at Brunswick in Germany, with husks of walnuts infused".
