= Om Ali =

Traditional Egyptian dessert

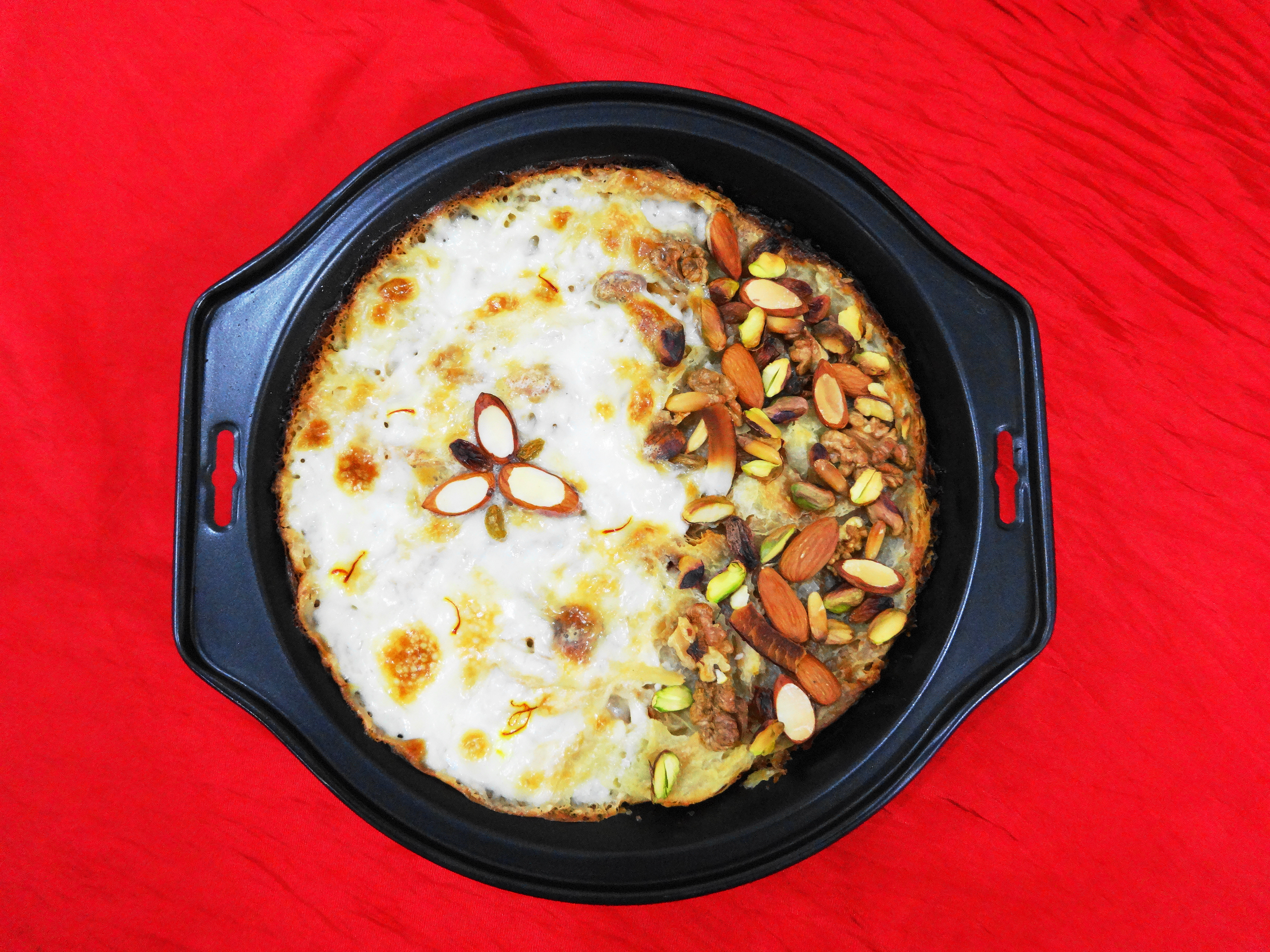
Traditional Egyptian dessert, Umm Ali

Om Ali, Omali, Umm Ali, or Oumm Ali (Arabic: أم علي), meaning "Ali's Mother", is a traditional Egyptian dessert, and is a national dessert of Egypt. There are numerous variations with different composition. The dish, which is traced back to as far as Medieval Egypt, is named after the wife of the Sultan of Egypt. It is commonly eaten during Ramadan as part of the iftar or sunset feast.

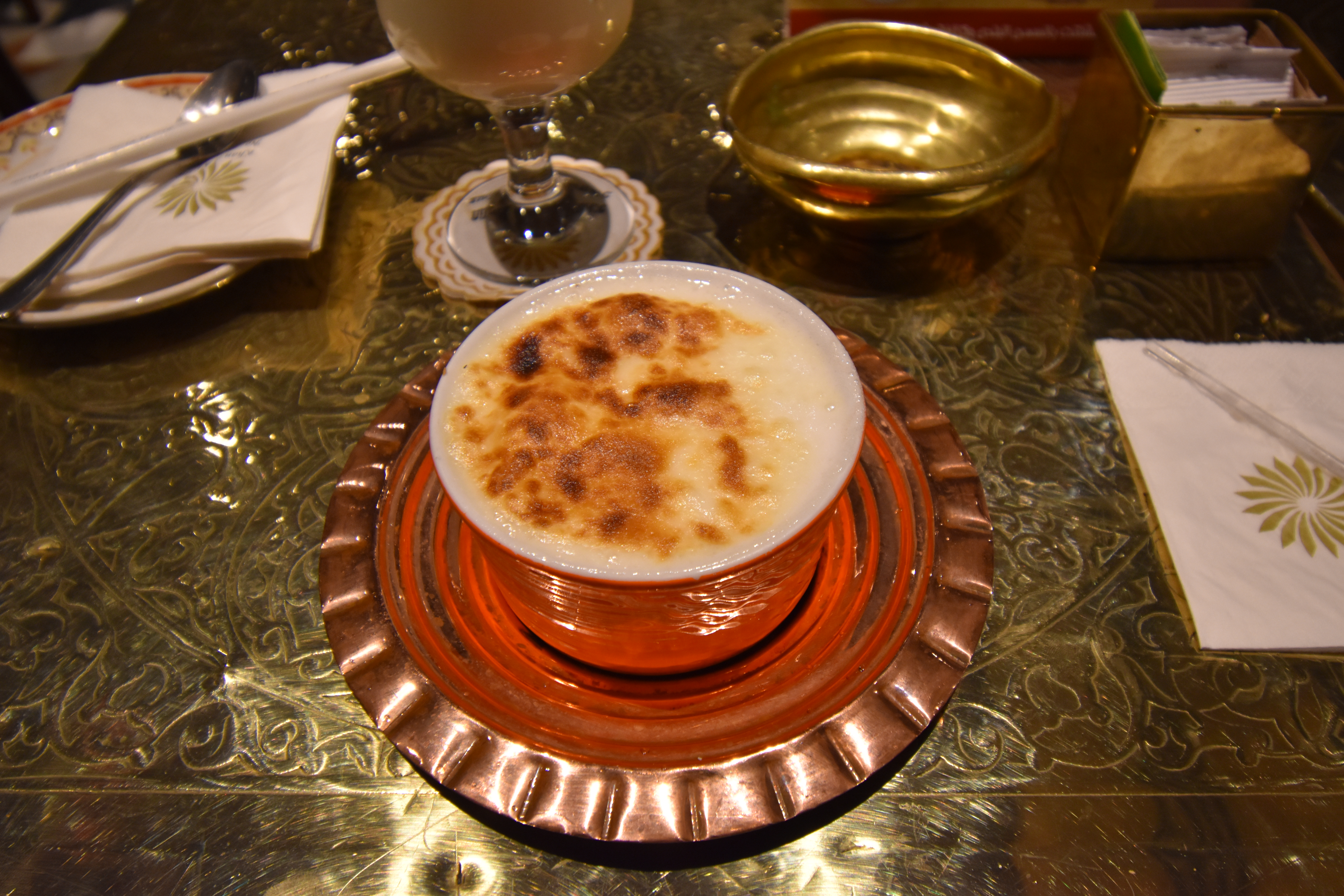
Om Ali as served at the Khan el Khalili Restaurant and Naguib Mahfouz Café (est. 1989), Cairo

== History ==
There are multiple versions of the origin of the dish. The most often cited version is that it originated as a celebration of the 1257 death of Shajar al-Durr, who had been married to Egypt's final Sultan from the Ayyubid dynasty, As-Salih, and subsequently to the first of Egypt's Mamluk Sultans, Izz al-Din Aybak. Shajar al-Durr plotted the murder of Aybak, after which she became ruler of Egypt. Ultimately, she was herself killed in retribution, whereafter Aybak's first wife, who was known as Om Ali, asked to have a dessert prepared in celebration. In some versions of the legend, Om Ali herself was the killer, beating Shajar to death with clogs. The dessert was popularised throughout the country, and was named after Om Ali.

Another version is that Om Ali celebrated the death of her husband, Aybak, and asked the cooks to come up with the most delicious dessert. The cooks used what was at hand: bread, milk and sugar.

However, there is no historical evidence connecting the dessert to the legend, and the first known recipe only dates back to the 19th century.

== Recipe ==
Typically, pastry (bread, pastry or puff pastry) is divided into pieces and blended with pistachios, coconut flakes, raisins and plenty of sugar. Milk, sometimes with cream, is poured over the mixture, which is then sprinkled with cinnamon. Finally, the mixture is baked in the oven until the surface is golden brown.

It may be eaten hot or cold.

There are Jordanian and Iraqi different variants known as "khumaiaa".

The dish may be compared to bread and butter pudding, albeit that the latter also includes eggs.
