= Venetia (Disraeli novel) =

1837 novel by Benjamin Disraeli

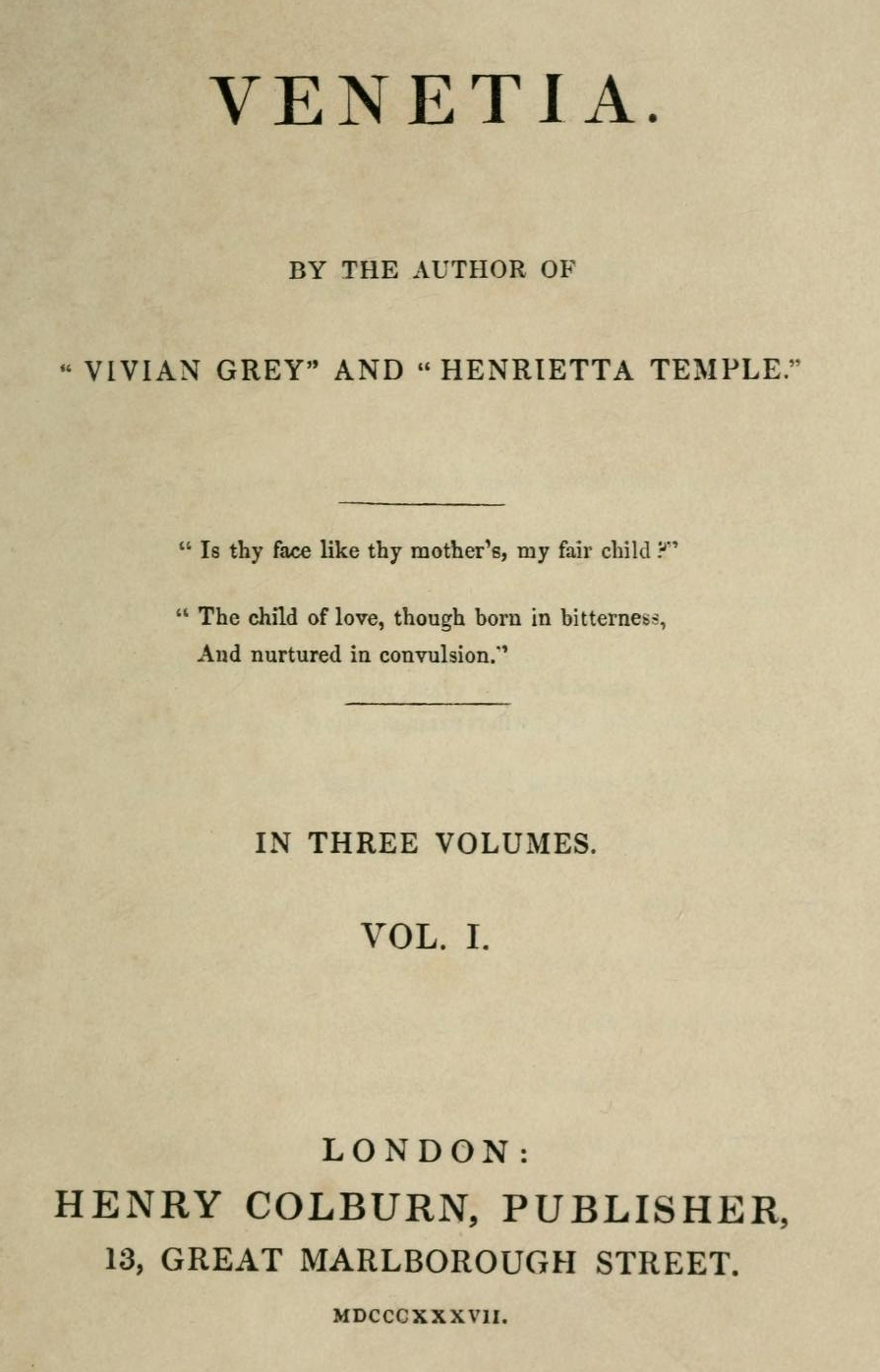
- First edition title page
- Author: Benjamin Disraeli
- Language: English
- Publisher: Henry Colburn
- Publication date: 1837
- Publication place: United Kingdom
- Pages: 400pp (Alan Rodgers 2005 U.S. edition)
- OCLC: 16849975

Venetia is a minor novel by Benjamin Disraeli, published in 1837, the year he was first elected to the House of Commons.

The novel is a lightweight romantic fantasy. A contemporary reviewer, writing in an 1854 issue of the New Monthly Review, declared that he “liked it least of all Disraeli’s works.”

Lord Byron and Shelley figure in its pages, under different names and different worldly circumstances from those in which they actually lived. We do not consider either portrait well drawn, and that of Shelley especially defective; but still Venetia, like all that Disraeli has written, contains much that is vivid and beautiful, and will be read with interest and delight by every man of taste.

Michael Flavin's Benjamin Disraeli: The Novel as a Political Discourse suggests that Venetia was largely a commercial endeavour for Disraeli, who was deep in debt at the time that he wrote it.

In Byron and the Victorians, Andrew Elfenbein discusses Venetia in terms of Disraeli's presenting himself as "the moral, political and literary successor to Byron, by manipulating the representation of Byron's sexuality", making him straight instead of bisexual and portraying him as having steady but distant male friendships. He says the novel can best be described as "kooky" because of its confused and confusing portrayals of both Byron and Shelley, giving each traits and life circumstances actually possessed by the other.
