= The English Huswife =

1615 book by Gervase Markham

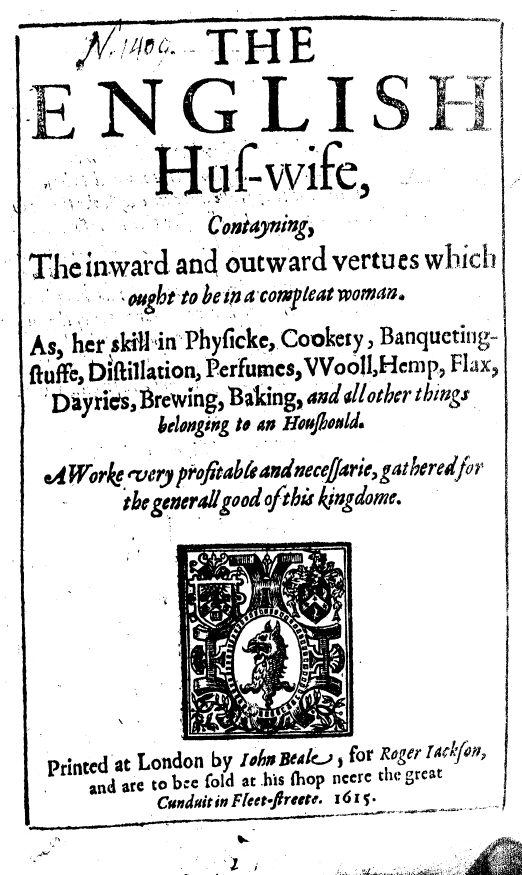
- Title page
- Author: Gervase Markham
- Subject: Remedies, Cookery
- Genre: Books for women
- Publisher: Roger Jackson
- Publication date: 1615
- Publication place: England

The English Huswife is a book of English cookery and remedies by Gervase Markham, first published in London by Roger Jackson in 1615. Markham's best-known work, it was a bestseller of its time, going through nine editions, and at least two other reprints, by 1683. It was issued as a two-volume work, Countrey Contentments, the other volume being The Husbandmans Recreations.

Although Markham disclaims authorship in the preface, he did adapt the recipes to suit current tastes, notably with sweet and sour sauces. The book contains what is probably the first published recipe for Banbury cake.

== Context ==
Markham was the third son of Sir Robert Markham of Cotham, Nottinghamshire, and was probably born in 1568. He was a soldier of fortune in the Low Countries, and later was a captain under the Earl of Essex's command in Ireland. He wrote voluminously on many subjects, to the extent that his booksellers procured from him a declaration in 1617 that he would write no more on certain topics.

== Book ==
The two-volume book was dedicated to Sir Theodore Newton.

The English Huswife was issued as the second part of Covntrey Contentments, In Two Bookes, The first, containing the whole art of riding great Horses in very short time... Likewise in two new Treatises the arts of hunting, hawking, coursing of Grey-hounds with the lawes of the leash, Shooting, Bowling, Tennis, Baloone &c.
The Second intituled, The English Huswife: Containing the Inward and Outward Virtues Which Ought to Be in a Complete Woman: as her Phisicke, Cookery, Banqueting-stuffe, Distillation, Perfumes, Wooll, Hemp, Flaxe, Dairies, Brewing, Baking, and all other things belonging to an Houshold. The first book is named on its first page as The Husbandmans Recreations.

=== Approach ===
Markham begins with a single paragraph disclaimer, starting "Thou mayst say (gentle Reader) what hath this man to doe with Hus-wifery, he is now out of his element", and explaining that it is an "approved Manuscript which he happily light[ed] on, belonging sometime to an honorable Personage of this kingdome, who was singular amongst those of her ranke for many of the qualities here set forth."

Markham does not name the lady in question.

Each recipe is given in a paragraph without a section heading, the title of the recipe being given instead in italics in the margin beside the recipe, as "Sauce for veale", or "Of puff pastrie"; sometimes the titles are written as goals, like "To make ginger bread". The recipes are given without lists of ingredients, and mainly without quantities. Thus, the pancake recipe calls for "two or three Eggs" mixed with "a pretty quantity of fair running water", with the comment "There be some which mix Pancakes with new Milk or Cream, but that makes them tough, cloying, and not so crisp, pleasant and savory as running water." The amount of flour in the pancakes is left up to the cook with the instruction "make it as thick as you think good with fine Wheat-flower". He includes the sweet spices cloves, mace, cinnamon, and nutmeg, and serves the pancakes strewn with sugar. The recipes rarely give any details of the heat or time required for cooking: thus the pancake recipe merely says "make them brown". But the book does explain how to roast meat so it is properly cooked.

Lastly to know when meate is rosted enough, for as too much rareness is unwholsome, so too much drinesse is not nourishing. Therefore to know when it is in the perfit height, and is neither too moist nor too drie: you shall observe these signes first in your large joints of meate, when the stemme or stroke of the meate offendeth, either upright, or els goeth from the fire, when it beginneth to shrinke from the spit, or when the gravy which droppeth from it is cleere without bloodinesse.

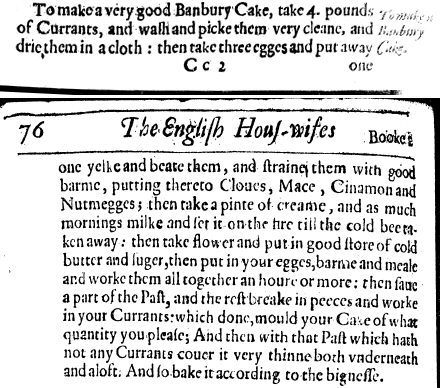
Gervase Markham's recipe for Banbury Cake, in The English Huswife, 1615

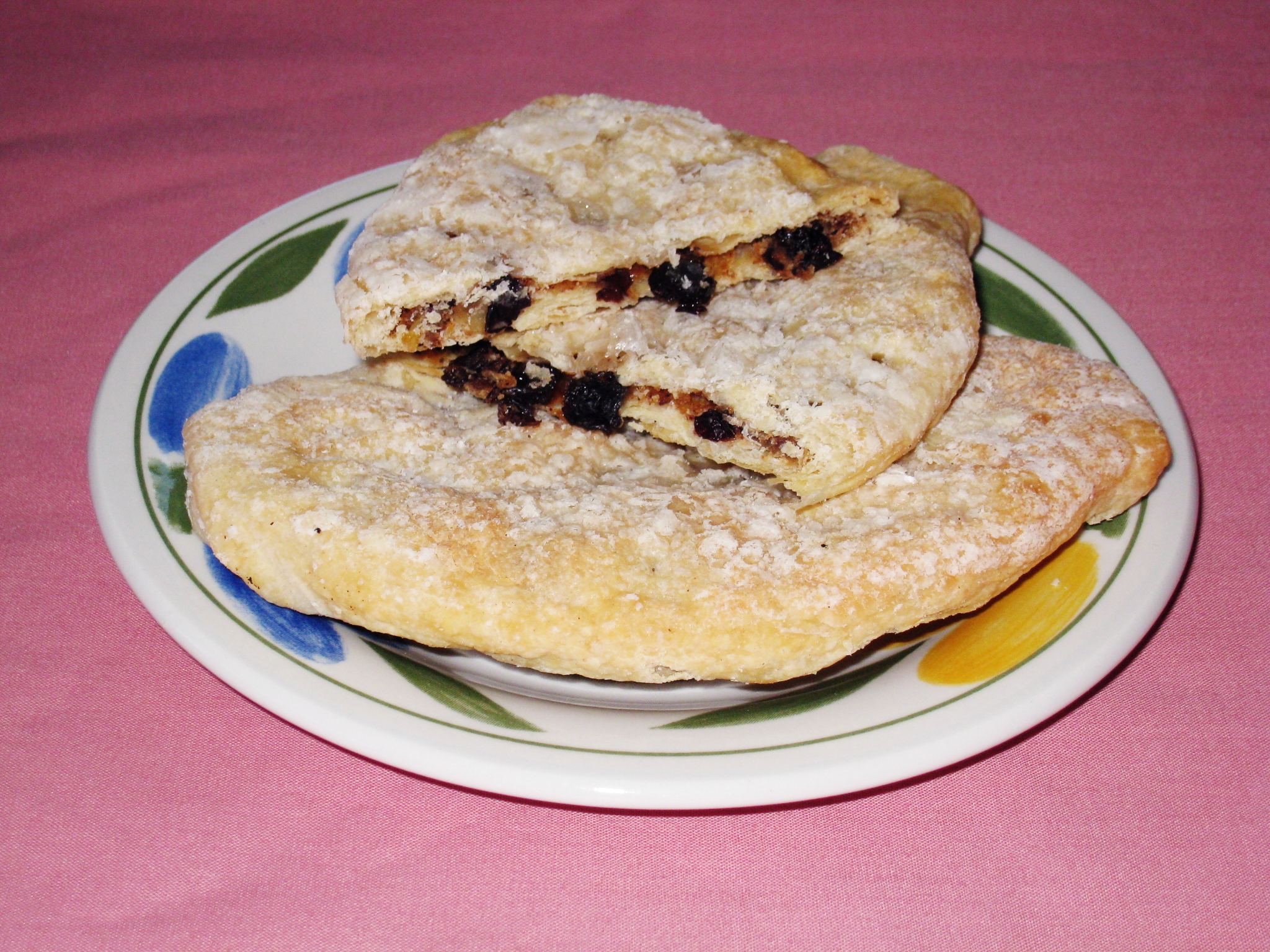
Banbury cakes

The recipe for "a very good" Banbury cake is probably the earliest published version. It calls for four pounds of currants, washed and dried; three eggs, beaten; yeast ("barm"); sweet spices; a pint of cream and a pint of warm milk; and unstated quantities of flour, butter and sugar. The dough is to be kneaded for "an houre or more", while the cake is to be baked "according to the bignesse". (Note: This was a single large cake, to be eaten in slices, rather than the small portion-sized cakes usual today.) A version of this recipe, adapted for small cakes, was given in The Guardian in 2012.

=== Contents ===
The 128-page book begins with "The Table", a table of contents listing the tasks and recipes in the book. It does not name the book's chapters, into which it is in fact divided. The titles shown are those used as page headers; Chapter 2 containing several of these.

- Chapter 1: House-hold Physicke. 1
- Chapter 2: Skill in Cookery. 36
  - Banquetting Stuffe. 69
  - Distillation. 79
  - Muske-balls, &c. 81
- Chapter 3: Of Woolle, Hempe, Flaxe and Cloth. 83
  - Dying of Wooll. 83
  - Skill in Hempe, Flaxe, &c. 87
- Chapter 4: Of Dairies, Butter, Cheese. 104
- Chapter 5: Of the office of the Brew-house, and the Bake-house. 120
  - Brewing. 120
  - Baking. 126

=== Editions ===
The following editions were printed.

- 1615 1st edition. Roger Jackson
- 16__ 2nd edition.
- 16__ 3rd edition.
- 1631 4th edition. Harison
- 1637 reprinted
- 1649 5th edition

--- reprinted 1986 McGill-Queen's University Press, edited by Michael R. Best

- 1653 reprinted. Brewster
- 1656 6th edition. Brewster
- 1660 7th edition. Brewster
- 1664 8th edition. Sawbridge
- 1683 9th edition. Sawbridge

== Reception ==
The British Library describes the book as a best-seller. It notes that although the title implies a female audience, only 5 to 10% of women were then literate, so most readers were clergymen or men of the gentry and the professions. It observes that Markham disclaimed authorship in the preface, but did adapt the recipes "to suit the fashions of the day", with sweet and sour sauces "very much in vogue at the time". He also included recipes from France, Spain and Italy.

Linda Woodbridge, reviewing Michael Best's edition of The English Housewife, describes it as a splendid modern text. She describes the maladies for which Markham proposed remedies as "some picturesque, some desperate", as they included "stinking breath which cometh from the stomach", "pimpled or red-saucy face", "griefs in the stomach", "desperate yellow jaundice", "pissing in bed", "falling of the fundament", and "privy parts burned". The remedies make use of "curatives as homely as parsley, as exotic as dried stag's pizzle. She notes that in the two parts of Countrey Contentments, Markham expected the country gentlemen to lead a purely recreational life, the country gentlewoman to have "one long round of unremitting hard work." But Woodbridge notes that at least booksellers of the time were recognising "that a substantial market of literate female book-buyers was something worth catering to."

Kate Colquhoun calls the book an "enormously popular collection of culinary and medical recipes", which she characterises as "aimed squarely at the well-off middling sort". She describes Markham as "always on the lookout for the detail that would make the difference", giving as example the way he explains how to make pastry of different kinds: rye paste with hot water and a little butter for a long-lasting "coffin"; for meat pies, "a good white crust 'somewhat thick'" of wheat flour with hot water or mutton broth and plenty of butter; and "melting short paste", with flour dried out in a warm oven and gently mixed with eggs, butter and cold water, to be rolled thin and served hot around delicate foods like chicken or fallow deer.

== Sources ==
- Michael R. Best (editor), The English Housewife, Toronto: McGill-Queen's University Press, 1986. ISBN 0-7735-0582-2.
- Frederick Noel Lawrence Poynter, A Bibliography of Gervase Markham, 1568?-1637, Oxford: Oxford Bibliographical Society, 1962.
