= Robert May (cook) =

English chef and writer (1588 – c. 1664)

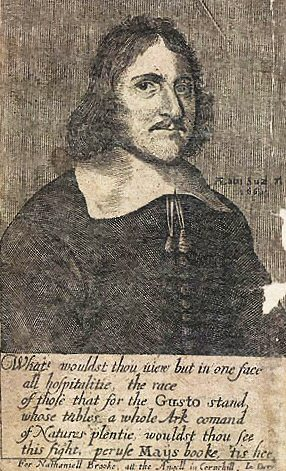
- Born: 1588; Wing, Buckinghamshire, England
- Died: in or after 1664
- Occupation: Chef

Robert May (1588 – in or after 1664) was an English professional chef who trained in France and worked in England. He is best known for writing and publishing the 1660 cookbook The Accomplisht Cook. It was the first major book of English recipes, and contains instructions for many soups and broths, as well as recipes for both sweet and savoury pies.

== Background ==
May was born in Wing, Buckinghamshire to Edwarde and Joan Mayes in 1588; however, he was not baptised until 2 April 1592. His father worked at Ascott Park as the chief cook to the Dormer family.

At age ten, May was sent to Paris by Lady Dormer—where he trained for five years to become a chef. Following his training, he served his apprenticeship in London, working for Arthur Hollinsworth (cook to the Grocer's Hall and Star Chamber). After his apprenticeship, May returned to Wing and became one of the five cooks reporting to his father at Ascott Park.

In the mid-1630s Sir Anthony Browne employed May to be the chef at his country estate (Cowdray House) in west Sussex.

May was of the Catholic faith, and worked for a total of thirteen households of minor English nobility (including many aristocratic Catholic families) until the English Civil War (1642–1651).

== The Accomplisht Cook ==
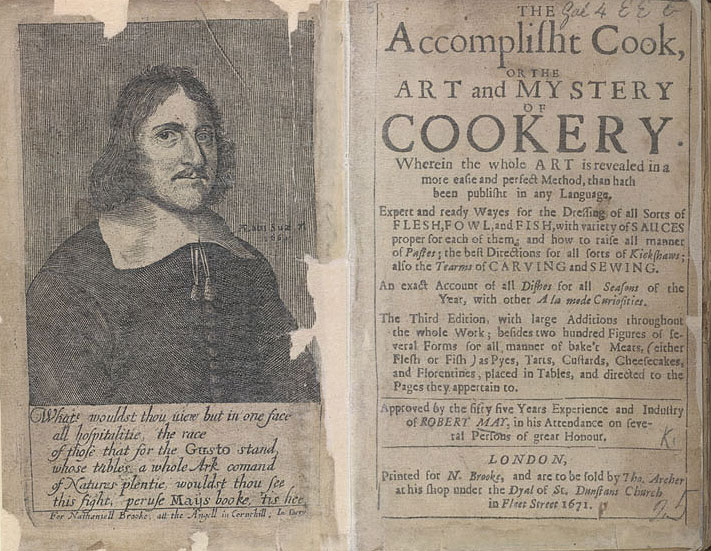
Frontispiece from Robert May's The Accomplisht Cook (1671 edition)

Following the civil war, May wrote and published The Accomplisht Cook which he subtitled Or the Art and Mystery of Cooking. The work was first published in 1660, and the last revision made during the author's lifetime was published in 1665. The 1685 edition of the work (at least its fifth) contains about 300 pages.

May's recipes included customs from the Middle Ages; however, he also embraced food trends from Europe—for example by including dishes such as French bisque and Italian brodo (broth). The Accomplisht Cook is still considered to be one of "the most extensive English treatment of potages, broths, and soups", with about 20 per cent of the volume devoted to them.

In addition to the large collection of recipes, the work contains a memoir of the author.

When a 1678 edition of the book was discovered and put up for sale in 2007, auctioneer Charles Hanson said "No more than 200 of these books were ever printed in the period".
