= Eliza Smith (writer) =

18th-century English cookery writer

Eliza Smith (died 1732?) was one of the most popular female 18th-century cookery book writers. Unlike other popular woman cookbook authors whose books overlapped with hers, such as Hannah Glasse, nothing seems to be known about her personal life beyond the fact that she was one of the first popular female cookbook authors. Her one book, The Compleat Housewife, or, Accomplished Gentlewoman's Companion (London: J. Pemberton, 1727), went through 18 editions in Britain and in 1742 Smith became the first cookbook author published in colonial America. Prior to her death, the name published in her book was E___ S____. After her death it was published as E. Smith. She was a housekeeper for thirty years: "for the Space of Thirty Years and upwards ... I have been constantly employed in fashionable and noble Families."
