= Christmas pie =

Christmas pie may refer to:

- An old name for mince pie
- Yorkshire Christmas pie
