= Yorkshire Christmas pie =

English pie

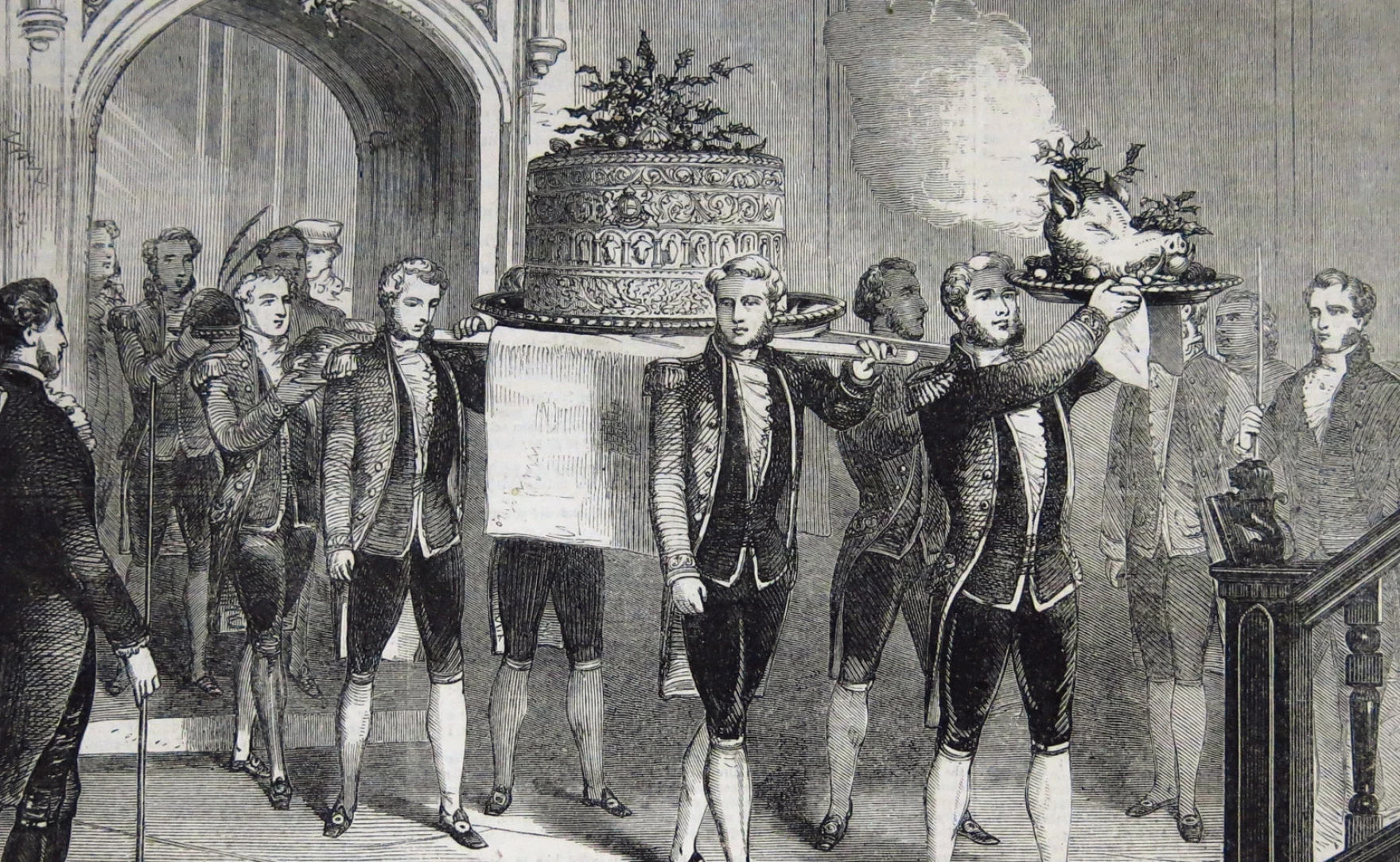
Presentation of Yorkshire Christmas pie at the 1857 Windsor Castle Banquet

A Yorkshire Christmas pie, or just Yorkshire pie is an elaborate standing pie, composed of a series of birds enclosed within one another in the manner of a Russian Doll; e.g. a poussin in a pigeon, in a partridge, in a goose, in a turkey. This bird amalgamation is placed in a dish with pieces of gamebird and hare, topped with pastry and basted liberally.

== History ==
In the Middle Ages, elaborate dishes were prized as the centrepieces of English feasts and celebrations. At Christmas, large standing pies were one such dish. A record from a Christmas feast in 1394 London described spiced capon, hare, partridge, pigeon, pheasant, and rabbits with offal and meatballs in a sauce cooked with pickled mushrooms, that was then set in pastry "made craftily in the likeness of a bird's body" including a feathered tail. By the 17th century, elaborate preparations had become rare in English cookery; in the case of pies, attributed to the invention of potting meat by historian C. Anne Wilson. Despite this, the Christmas pie preparation continued to be made in the form of the Yorkshire Christmas pie, which reached the height of its popularity in the 18th century.

One recipe for "A Yorkshire Christmas-Pye" was included by Hannah Glasse in her 1747 The Art of Cookery Made Plain and Easy:

First make a good standing crust, let the wall and bottom be very thick; bone a turkey, a goose, a fowl, a partridge, and a pigeon. Season them all very well, take half an ounce of mace, half an ounce of nutmegs, a quarter of an ounce of cloves, and half an ounce of black pepper, all beat fine together, two large spoonfuls of salt, and then mix them together. Open the fowls all down the back, and bone them; first the pigeon, then the partridge, cover them; then the fowl, then the goose, and then the turkey, which must be large; season them all well first and lay them in the crust, so as it will look only like a whole turkey; then have a hare already eased (skinned), and wipe with a clean cloth. Cut it to pieces; that is, joint it; season it, and lay is as close as you can on one side; on the other side woodcocks, moor game and what sort of wild fowl you can get. Season them well, and lay them close; put at least four pounds of butter into the pie, then lay on your lid, which must be a very thick one and let it be well baked. It must have a very hot oven, and will take at least four hours.

This crust will take a bushel of flour. In this chapter you will see how to make it. These pies are often sent to London in a box as presents; therefore the walls must be well-built.

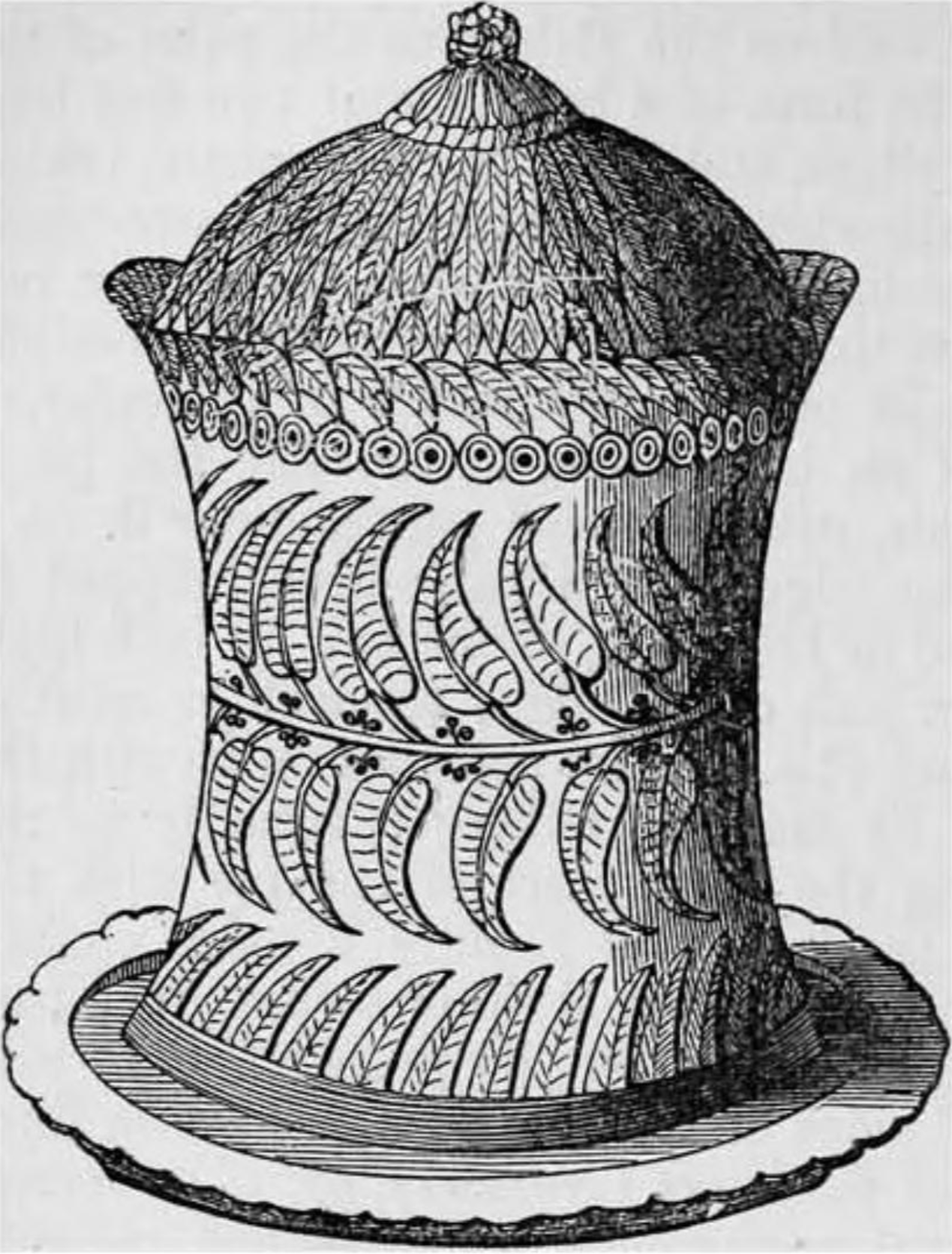
Yorkshire Christmas pie as depicted in Charles Elmé Francatelli's 1846 The Modern Cook

Glasse's final remark referenced what remained a common practice into the late 19th century, made possible in the 18th century by the construction of roads able to support a fast and stable journey. Even with these new roads, the journey remained rough, and the pastry was made thick to protect its contents. Intended as a container rather than food, it was not eaten. Over the 18th through late 19th centuries, transport of the pies shifted from coach to train. Accompanying the pies, York ham was often sent as a secondary present.

In the winter conditions of Christmas-time London, Yorkshire Christmas pies would keep for long periods, and records describe families still eating pies they received for Christmas in early February. The inclusion of goose, and the fat it contained, was another element contributing to the dish's preservation. At serving, some pies were taken apart and carved before eating, in cases where chefs had not boned the birds.

== Goose pie ==
A smaller pie which Glasse called "A Goose-Pye" has been characterized by culinary historians Keith Stavely and Kathleen Fitzgerald as a simpler version of Glasse's Yorkshire Christmas pie. This pie required a cook enclose a pickled, dried tongue in a fowl, that was then stuffed in a goose. Later that century, "Yorkshire Goose Pye" was the name Elizabeth Raffald gave to a recipe in The Experienced English Housekeeper (1769), closely resembling Glasse's recipe for Yorkshire Christmas pie including detail on making the pie suited for travel.

In 1806, Maria Rundell published her book A New System of Domestic Cookery, including recipes for "Green-goose Pie" and "Duck pie" made in the manner of Glasse's smaller Goose-Pye with pickled calf tongue at their centre. Elaborating on such preparations, Rundell describes a tradition of pie-making in Staffordshire, to the north-west of London: "The large pies in Staffordshire are made as above: but with a goose outwards, then a turkey, a duck next, then a fowl; and either tongue, small birds, or forcemeat, in the middle."

Recipes for smaller pies continued throughout the century, including one in The Practice of Cookery (1830) by Mrs. Dalgairns in England, which was copied and included in The Cook's Own Book, a text published in Boston, Massachusetts in 1832 and credited to a "Mrs. N. K. M. Lee". Cookbooks in the US continued to feature such recipes into at least the 1850s, in the works of Eliza Leslie in Philadelphia, Pennsylvania and Mrs Bliss in Boston.

== In literature and letters ==
References to Yorkshire Christmas pies, sometimes under the name Yorkshire pies, appear in literature and letters throughout the 19th century. In Tom Brown at Oxford, an 1861 novel by Thomas Hughes, it is said "Then there would be a deep Yorkshire pie, or reservoir of potted game, as a piece, de resistance". In the 1855 short story "The Holly Tree", Charles Dickens describes a character's encounter with such a pie:

Once I passed a fortnight at an Inn in the North of England, where I was haunted by the ghost of a tremendous pie. It was a Yorkshire pie, like a fort,--an abandoned fort with nothing in it; but the waiter had a fixed idea that it was a point of ceremony at every meal to put the pie on the table. After some days I tried to hint, in several delicate ways, that I considered the pie done with; as, for example, by emptying fag-ends of glasses of wine into it; putting cheese-plates and spoons into it, as into a basket; putting wine-bottles into it, as into a cooler; but always in vain, the pie being invariably cleaned out again and brought up as before. At last, beginning to be doubtful whether I was not the victim of a spectral illusion, and whether my health and spirits might not sink under the horrors of an imaginary pie, I cut a triangle out of it, fully as large as the musical instrument of that name in a powerful orchestra. Human provision could not have foreseen the result--but the waiter mended the pie. With some effectual species of cement, he adroitly fitted the triangle in again, and I paid my reckoning and fled.

Mention of Yorkshire Christmas pie also appears in the letters of J. M. W. Turner in 1845, where he expresses thanks for the gift of one from Yorkshire.

== Modern ==
In modern times, the practice of making Yorkshire Christmas pies has been revived by some cooks. One such version was sold in the UK in 2004 for about £100, and placed pork stuffing in a pigeon, in a pheasant, in a chicken, in a small turkey, all in a goose. All the birds were boned. Another, cheaper version was also available, enclosing a pigeon in a chicken in a duck, with sage and apple stuffing positioned throughout.

A dish eaten in France, Oreiller de la Belle Aurore, was described by Jane Grigson as similar, though without the element of birds being enclosed in each other. The turducken retains the practice of enclosing a series of birds within each other, though it lacks the paste surrounding the main bird in the Yorkshire Christmas pie or its pastry.

== See also ==
- List of Christmas dishes
- List of pies, tarts and flans
- Medieval cuisine
- Mince pie — historically known as Christmas pie

== Sources ==
- Alcock, Joan P (2006). "The Ambiguity of Authenticity". In Hosking, Richard (ed.). Authenticity in the Kitchen: Proceedings of the Oxford Symposium on Food and Cookery 2005. Blackawton, Devon: Prospect Books. ISBN 1-903018-47-1.
- Boyd, Lizzie (1988). British Cookery (2nd ed.). Bromley, Kent: Christopher Helm Publishers. ISBN 0-7470-0223-1.
- Brears, Peter (2018). "Everyday meals in Regency London: Part III, celebrations". Petits Propos Culinaires 112. London: Prospect Books.
- Davidson, Alan (2014). "Yorkshire Christmas pie". In Davidson, Alan; Jaine, Tom (eds.). The Oxford Companion to Food (3rd ed.). Oxford University Press. ISBN 978-0-19-967733-7.
- Grigson, Jane (1974). English Food. Basingstoke, Hampshire and London: MacMillan London Ltd. ISBN 0333152131.
- Flanders, Judith (2017). Christmas: A Biography. New York: Thomas Dunne Books. ISBN 978-1-250-11834-9.
- Hughes, Glyn (2017). The Lost Foods of England. Winster, Derbyshire: Lulu Press. ISBN 978-0-244-02963-0.
- Krythe, Maynie R. (1954). All About Christmas. New York: Harper. OCLC 601598.
- Shanahan, Madeline (2019). Christmas Food and Fasting: A History. The Meals Series. Lanham, Maryland: Rowman & Littlefield. ISBN 978-1-442-27698-7.
- Stavely, Keith; Fitzgerald, Kathleen (2011). Northern Hospitality: Cooking by the Book in New England. Amherst & Boston: University of Massachusetts Press. ISBN 978-1-55849-861-7.
- Wilson, C Anne (1976) [1973]. Food & Drink in Britain: From the Stone Age to Recent Times. Harmondsworth, London: Penguin. ISBN 0-14-055-101-8.
