= Raised pie =

Type of pie

A raised or standing pie was a type of pie common in England during the Middle Ages. It was made by forming a hot water crust pastry from a mixture of boiling water, flour, and sometimes lard, which was laid over a tall, wooden mould where it cooled and hardened. Removed from the mould, the pastry was baked before cooked meat was added, along with a stock that would cool to a jelly. A top was formed from the remaining dough, and the whole piece decorated with shaped pieces of dough. The pastry, known as a "coffyn" or "coffer", became very hard during baking and was not eaten except by the poor and dogs.

During the Middle Ages, raised pies were served at banquets where their primary function was spectacle rather than flavour. Cooks achieved this by enclosing items that would be revealed at service, including whole roast animals, live birds as in "Sing a Song of Sixpence", or musicians. At other times, the entire pie was formed to resemble objects, including castles or swans, the latter replete with a large feathered tail.

== Sources ==
- Boyd, Lizzie (1988). British Cookery (2nd ed.). Bromley, Kent: Christopher Helm Publishers. ISBN 0-7470-0223-1.
- Flanders, Judith (2017). Christmas: A Biography. New York: Thomas Dunne Books. ISBN 978-1-250-11834-9.
- Grigson, Jane (1984) [1971]. Good Things. Lincoln, Nebraska: University of Nebraska Press. ISBN 0-8032-5971-9.
- Hartley, Dorothy (1996) [1954]. Food in England. London: Little, Brown and Company. ISBN 0-316-87900-2.
- Mason, Laura; Brown, Catherine (2007). From Norfolk Knobs to Fidget Pie: Food from the Midlands and East Anglia. London: Harper Press. ISBN 978-0-00-779-841-4.
- Weaver, William Woys (2003). "Pie". In Katz, Solomon H (ed.). Encyclopedia of Food and Culture. Scribner Library of Daily Life. Vol. 3. New York: Charles Scribner’s Sons. ISBN 0-684-80567-7.
