= The Kandy Bar =

Bakery chain from Scotland

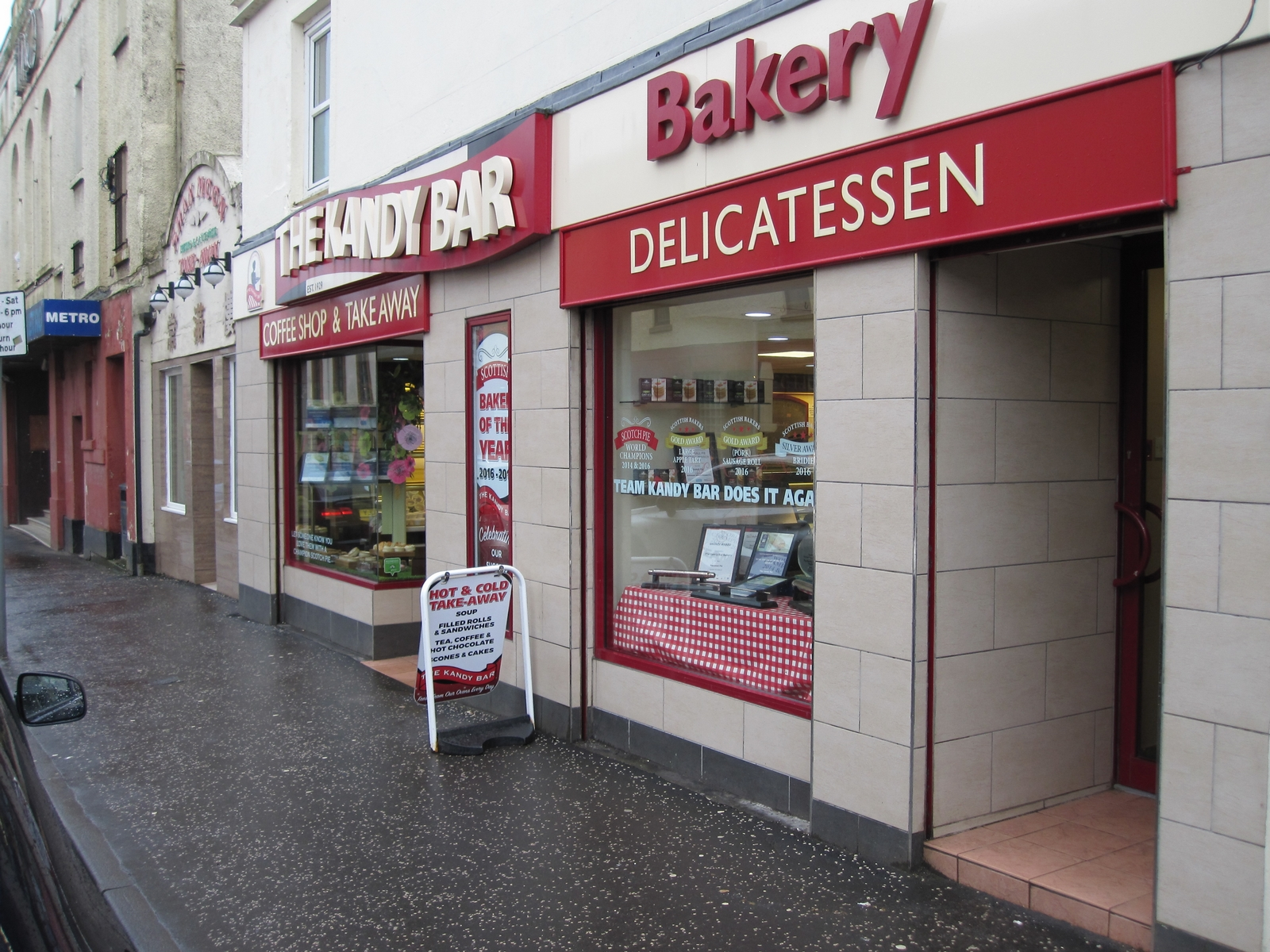
- 2018 photograph of the exterior of the original Kandy Bar location in Saltcoats
- Type: Public
- Industry: Food
- Founded: 1929
- Number of locations: 5 locations (2019)
- Key people: Stephen McAllister; Rona McAllister; Craig McPhee; Lesley McPhee
- Products: Scotch pies; Doughnuts; Apple tarts; Sausage rolls
- Owner: Craig and Lesley McPhee
- Number of employees: 90 (2026)
- Website: facebook.com/thekandybarbakery

The Kandy Bar, also known as The Kandy Bar Bakery, is a Scottish bakery chain. It was founded in 1929 in Saltcoats by the McAllister family. It specialises in sweet and savoury products such as Scotch pies, doughnuts, apple tarts, and sausage rolls. The Kandy Bar has won multiple awards, including the World Champion Scotch Pie three times in 2014, 2016, and 2024. In October 2026, the business was sold to Craig McPhee and his wife, Lesley. The Kandy Bar has been described as "one of Scotland’s best-known traditional family bakeries".

== History ==
The Kandy Bar was founded in 1929 in Saltcoats by the McAllister family. Stephen McAllister's grandfather originally established it as a bakery, before Stephen McAllister's father made it into a sweet shop that also sold scotch pies. The Kandy Bar was established as a business in 1962. Stephen McAllister is the fourth generation of his family to run the business. McAllister has been the owner since 1991. He also runs the business with his wife, Rona. As of 2026, The Kandy Bar has 90 employees. It has two stores in Saltcoats, and has other locations in Kilwinning, Stevenston, and West Kilbride. Products include Scotch pies, doughnuts, apple tart, and sausage rolls.

In an interview in 2016, The Kandy Bar said that after winning the Scotch Pie World Champion title that year, there was a "natural surge of customers from far afield". In May 2019, The Kandy Bar was donating ten pence for every doughnut sold to The Children's Trust charity for a week. Due to the COVID-19 pandemic, The Kandy Bar enforced social distancing guidelines at the queue area. In 2025, they donated charity-branded cookies to Mary's Meals.

In February 2026, The Kandy Bar was listed for sale and attracted six offers as Stephen McAllister and Rona set out retirement plans. On October 22, the business was sold to Craig McPhee and his wife, Lesley. McPhee comes from a family bakery business and has experience in the industry. According to The Ardrossan and Saltcoats Herald, The Kandy Bar will continue to operate as normal under his ownership.

== Reception ==
The Kandy Bar won at the Scotch Pie Club Awards, being the overall winner in 2014 and 2016, and "Best Football Pie" in 2015. They were the overall winner at the World Champion Scotch Pie three times in 2014, 2016, and 2024. At the 2014 World Scotch Pie Championships, The Kandy Bar got a silver award for its apple tart and three bronze awards, as well as a silver award for their scotch pie in 2018.

The Kandy Bar won the Scottish Baker Of The Year title in 2016 and 2017, becoming the only bakery to win both the title and the World Champion Scotch Pie in the same year. In 2019, Paul Fisher of The Ardrossan and Saltcoats Herald said It has a "brilliant reputation for freshly baked goodies and are popular with residents from North Ayrshire and beyond." In 2026, Lucy Wheeler of the Scottish Bakers said it's "one of Scotland’s best-known traditional family bakeries".
