= Mince pie =

Sweet pie with dried fruits and spices

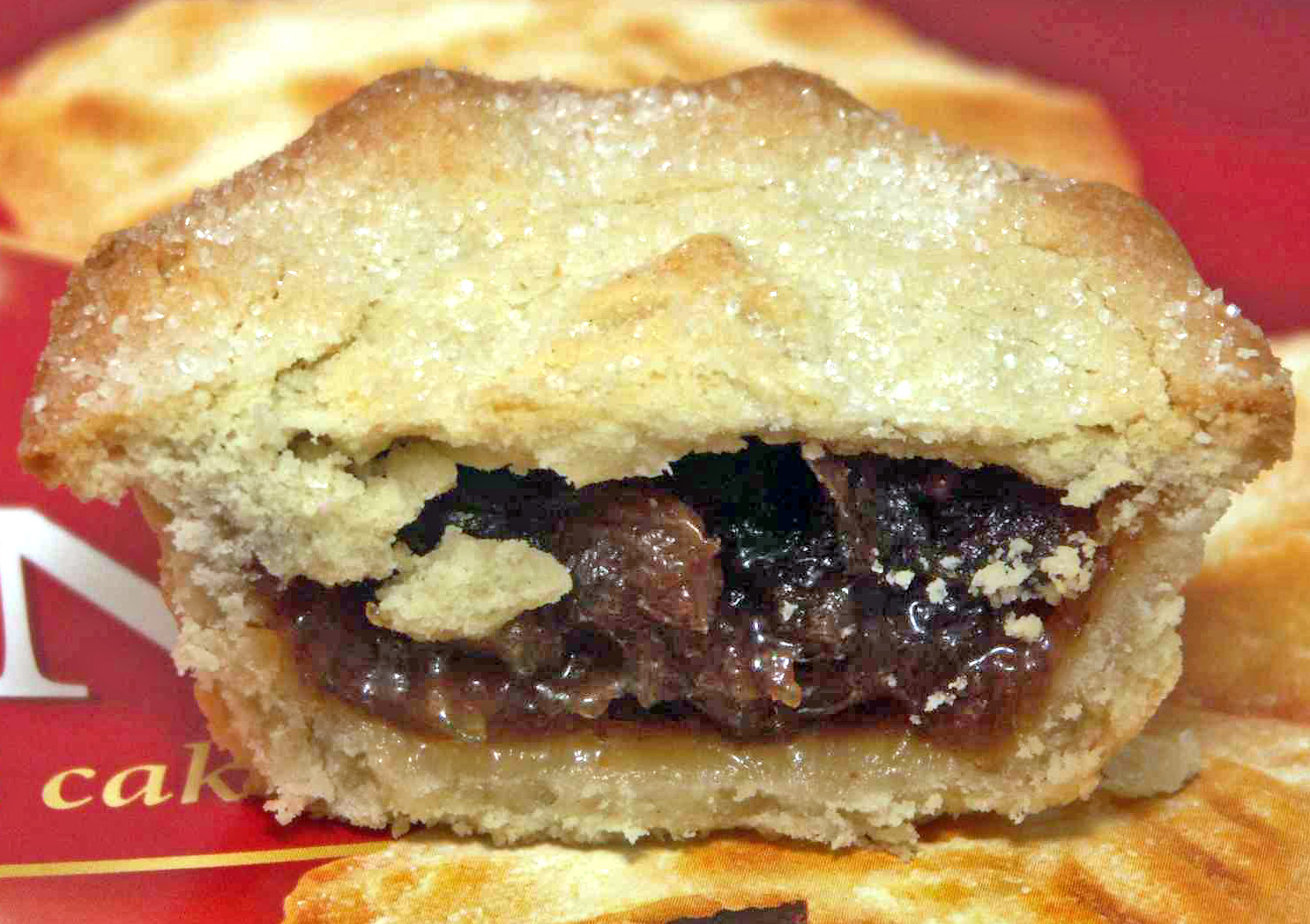
- A mince pie, cut in half
- Type: Pie
- Course: Dessert
- Place of origin: England
- Main ingredients: Mincemeat; Pastry

A mince pie is a sweet pie of English origin filled with mincemeat: a mixture of fruits, nuts, spices and a spirit—usually brandy—or vinegar. Also included is a fat, traditionally beef suet, although vegetable alternatives can be used. A mince pie is traditionally served during the Christmas season in much of the English-speaking world. Its history is a matter of debate but it dates back to the medieval period, possibly to the eleventh century, when returning European crusaders brought spices back with them.

Historically, a mince pie was made with meat before changing to the current form. The meat used in recipes varied, but included neat's tongue (cattle), beef, mutton, tripe and could also include fish. As the ingredients were expensive, the pies were only eaten on feast days; this changed to their becoming associated with Christmas, when they are mostly consumed.

The mince pie was attacked and stigmatised by the Puritans during the English Interregnum (1649 to 1660) for its indulgent and supposed Catholic connotations. The recipe for the mince pie was taken to the Americas by English settlers to the New England Colonies where it became associated with both Christmas and Thanksgiving dinner. From the seventeenth century onwards the mince pie moved towards being a small, individual size, rather than for sharing among several people. From the eighteenth century onwards the influx of cheap sugar from the British plantations of the West Indies led to the mince pie becoming more sweet than savoury. The following century recipes increasingly stopped including meat, although there are still some meat recipes being published in the twenty-first century.

Much folklore has developed around the mince pie, including that the spices used in the pie represent the gifts given to Jesus by the Magi and that the Elizabethans would shape a mince pie to represent Jesus's crib, complete with a pastry model of Jesus on top. Food historians state that there is little evidence to support either of these pieces of folklore.

== Description and etymology ==
Preparation

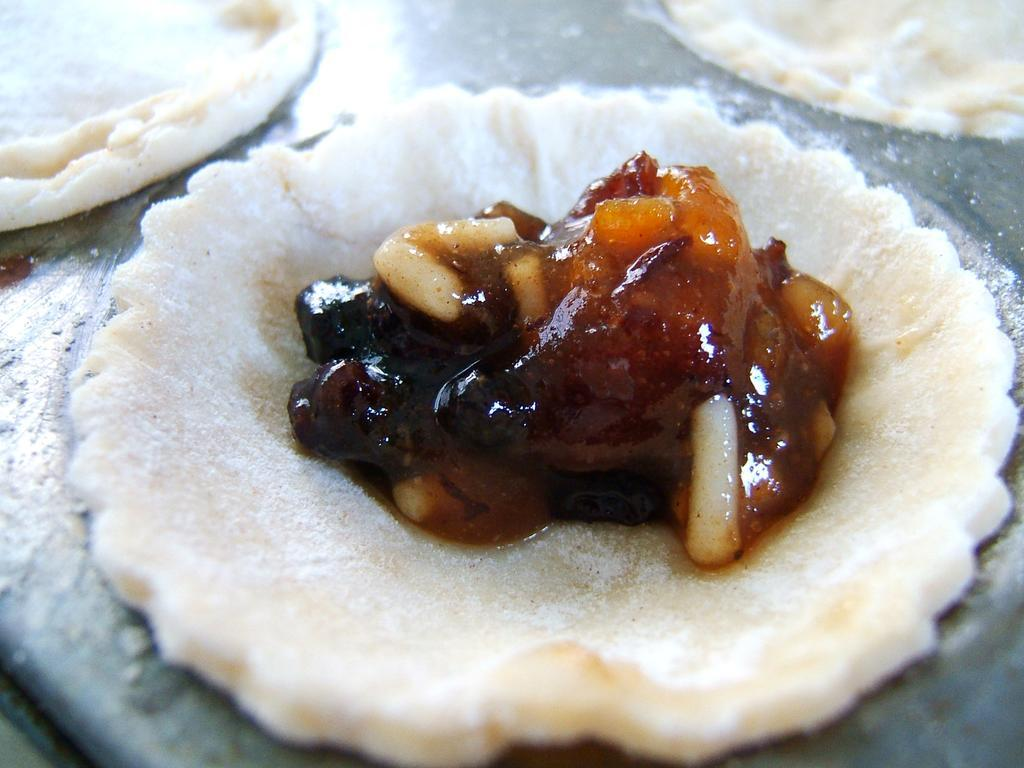
Filled and uncovered mince pies in a baking tray

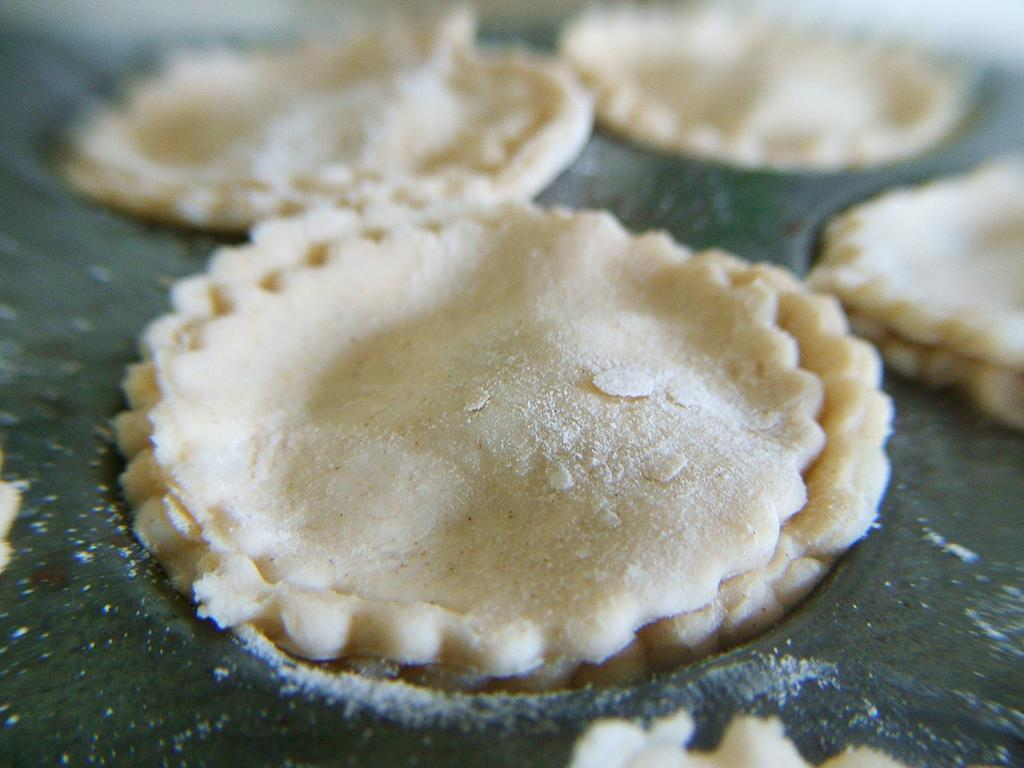
Covered and waiting to be baked

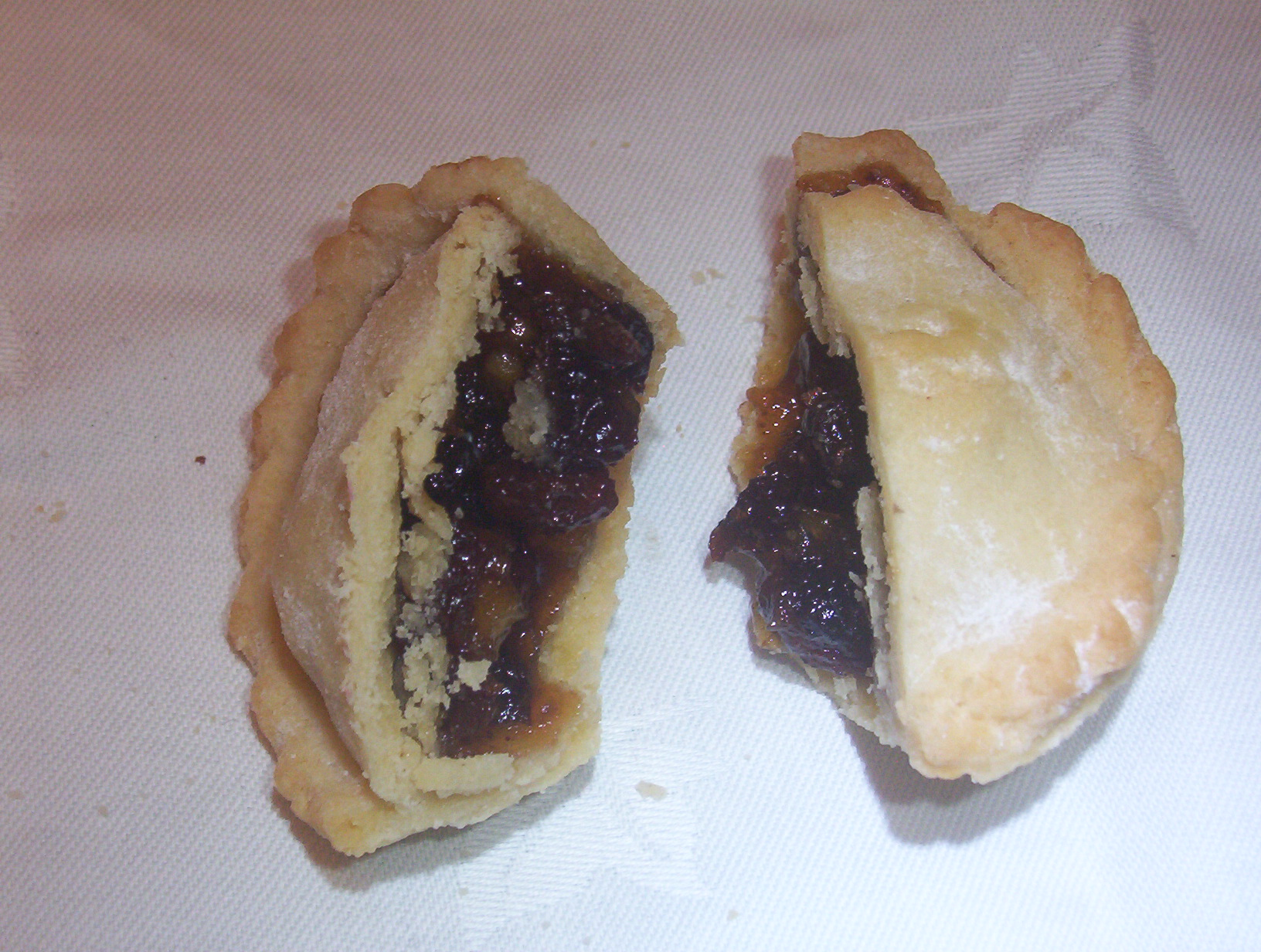
Pie, dusted with icing sugar and cut in half

A mince pie comprises a sweet pastry shell—normally shortcrust—which is rolled out until it is thin and even, then placed into a suitable mould. A mincemeat filling is then added. In the twenty-first century mincemeat does not contain meat, but is made with dried fruits, nuts, apples, spices and either an alcoholic spirit—normally brandy—or vinegar. Also included is a fat, traditionally beef suet, (Note: Suet is the hard fat that surrounds the kidneys of beef and mutton.) although vegetable alternatives can be used. The food writer Glyn Hughes opines that mincemeat improves if stored for at least two weeks. The pie has a pastry lid—also normally shortcrust, but this can also be puff pastry—which can be decorated. The pie is then baked in a moderate to hot oven until it is browned. It is often served with an accompaniment such as cream, brandy butter, Cumberland rum butter, (Note: Named after the historic county of the same name, Cumberland rum butter is a hard sauce of butter, rum, sugar and spices. As well as its use at Christmas, traditionally it was also made by expectant mothers three months before their child was born, then served on oatcakes to those celebrating the birth.) ice cream or cheese.

In Britain in the twenty-first century, a mince pie tends to be small—for individual consumption—and round; in North America, it tends to be large and intended for sharing among several people. Historically, as the ingredients were expensive, a pie was only eaten on feast days; this changed to it becoming associated with Christmas, when most are consumed; an estimated 175 million were eaten in the UK in 2025. A mince pie can be made at home or purchased from commercial outlets; similarly, the mincemeat can homemade or commercially produced.

The Oxford English Dictionary states that "mince" comes from the Anglo-Norman and Old French words mincer or mincier, which is to "to cut up (food) into small pieces". The chef Rory Macdonald suggests that mince is from the Latin word minutus, meaning small; he adds that it "has no connotation with minced meat".

== History ==
Homemade mince pies

The mince pie has historically been known under other names, including "minched", "minst" or "minced pie", "shrid" or "shred pie", "secrets pie", "mutton pie" and "Christmas pie". In the United States it is known either as "mince pie" or "mincemeat pie".

Historically, a mince pie was made with meat before changing to the current form. The meat used in recipes varied, but included neat's tongue (cattle), beef, mutton, tripe and could also include fish. The origin of the mince pie is a matter of debate. The food historian Adrian Bailey identifies the origin of the mince pie as being Cumberland, in the north of England. The area developed the "standing pie" or "sweet pie", which comprised chopped mutton, apples and raisins in a pastry case; Bailey describes them as "the grandfather of the mince pie". The historian Madeline Shanahan considers the mince pie had its origins in the medieval "chewette", a small pie containing meat or offal, hard-boiled eggs, dried fruits and spices. Other food historians and writers state that the mince pie can be dated back to the 11th century and those returning from the Crusades in the Middle East. The crusaders brought back with them spices such as cinnamon, nutmeg and cloves.

=== From the medieval period to the Elizabethans ===
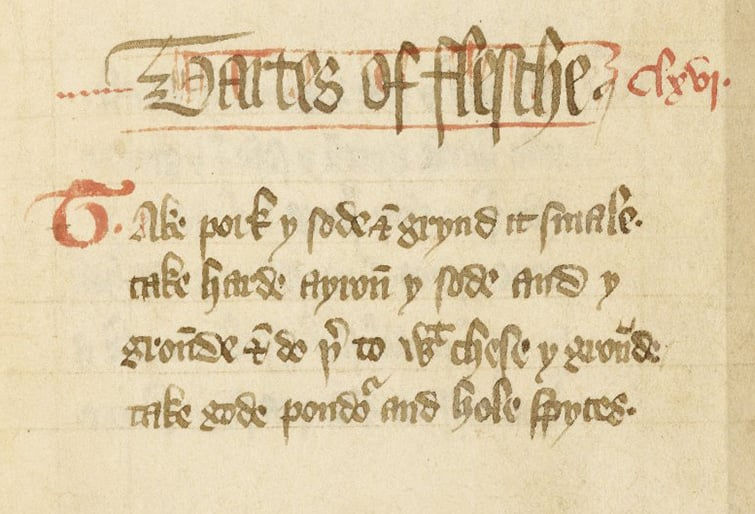
Recipe for "tartes of flessh", a possible forerunner of the mince pie, from the 1390 English cookery book The Forme of Cury

The 1390 English cookery book The Forme of Cury contains a recipe for "tartes of flesshe" (meat pies), a possible forerunner of the mince pie; the recipe lists the ingredients as minced pork, figs, raisins, wine, pine kernels, lard, cheese, honey and spices. In 1615 Gervase Markham published his work The English Huswife. It included a recipe for "minc't pies", which were similar to "tartes of flesshe", although Markham used mutton, rather than pork. This was baked in a thick pastry case called a coffyn or coffin, which was often disposed of without being eaten. (Note: The word coffyn or coffin as meaning "pastry case" pre-dates the use for a box in which a corpse is placed for burial.)

Take a leg of mutton, and cut the best of the best flesh from the bone, and parboyle it well: then put to it three pound of the best mutton suet, and shred it very small: then spread it abroad, and season it with pepper and salt, cloves and mace: then put in good store of currants, great raysons and prunes clean washt and pickt, a few dates slic't, and some orange pills slic't: then being all well mixt together, put it into a coffin, or into divers coffins, and so bake them: and when they are served up, open the liddes and strow store of suger on the top of the meate and upon the lid. And in this sort you may also bake beef or veal, onely the beef would not be parboyld, and the veal will ask a double quantity of suet.

=== From the Elizabethan era to the Stuart Restoration ===
By the Elizabethan era the recipe had not changed much since the medieval version. In her "receipt book", (Note: The common name for a recipe was, at the time, "receipt".) (dated 1604), Elinor Fettiplace included a recipe for mince pies that included mutton with the same amount of beef suet and "twice so much sugar as salt". Hilary Spurling, Fettiplace's biographer, followed the recipe and noted that the sugar, like the salt, was meant as a seasoning, rather than to make the pies as sweet as modern versions. Spurling likened the results to empanadas from Argentina or samosas and other Middle Eastern "dry, mildly spiced meat pasties".

Mince pie shapes, 1690s and 1700s

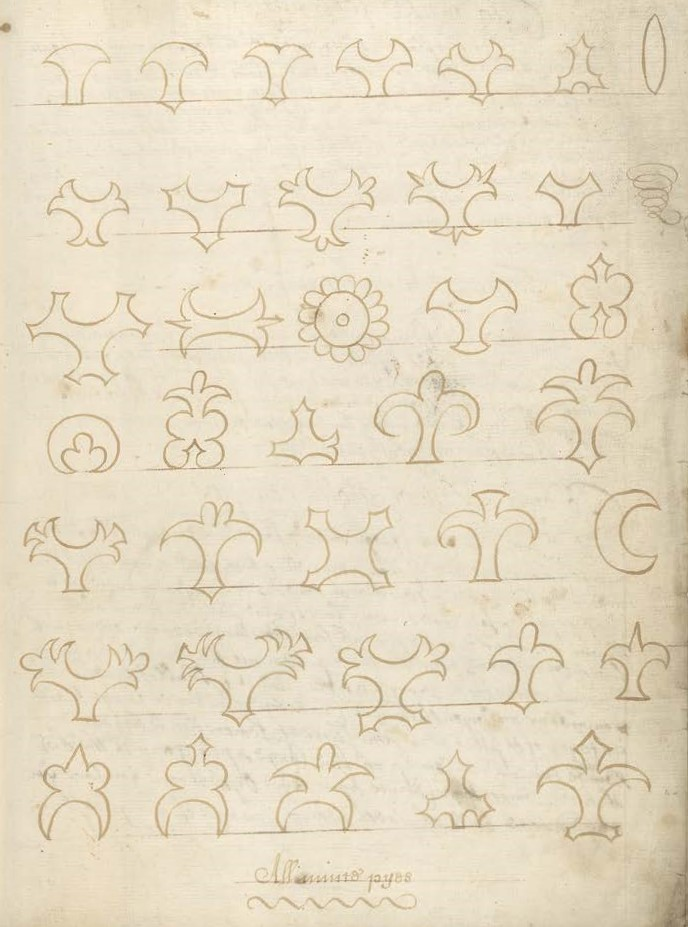
Mince pie shapes from Hannah Bisaker's receipt book, 1692

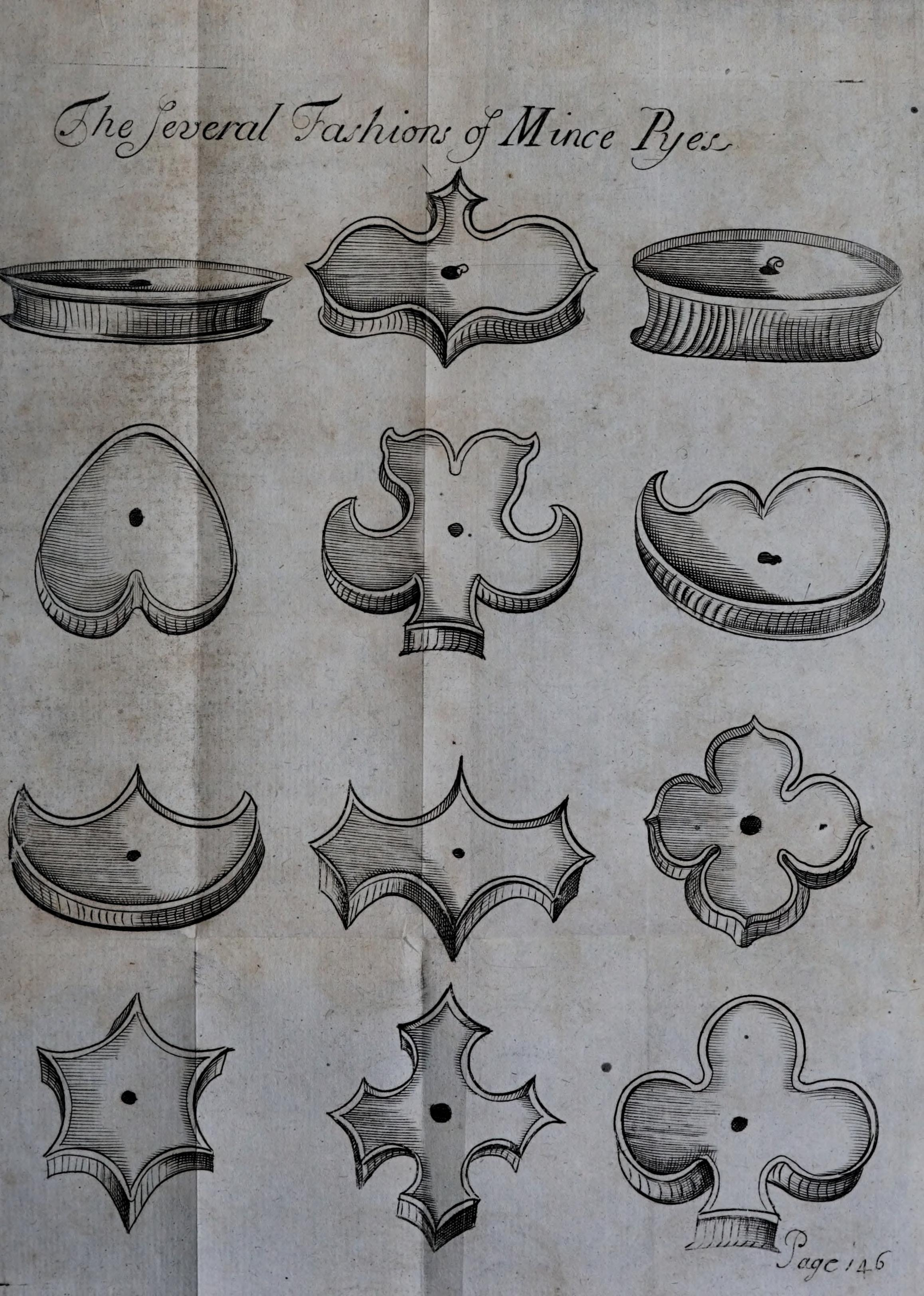
"The Several Fashions of Mince Pyes", 1708 (Note: From Henry Howard's cookery book England's Newest Way in All Sorts of Cookery, Pastry and all Pickles that are Fit to be Used.)

Some sources describe how the mince pie was banned by the puritanical parliamentarians during the Interregnum (1649 to 1660) following the English Civil War. Others, including the food historian Sam Bilton disagree; Bilton, writing for English Heritage, describes the ban as a myth. The Puritans banned Christmas in the 1647—along with Easter and Whitsun—in "An Ordinance for Abolishing of Festivals", but there was no ban on any foodstuff. (Note: There is a similar urban myth that it is illegal to eat a mince pie on Christmas Day. Although there has never been such a general law, in 1644 Christmas Day fell on a day on which people were legally obliged to fast, which meant the mince pie—as well as all other food—was not allowed to be eaten.) The Puritans attacked and stigmatised the mince pie for its indulgent and supposed Catholic connotations. Their attitude was mocked in verse by Richard Fletcher in 1656 in his poem "Christmas Day":

A plot, by its ingredients, beef and pyes.
The cloyster'd steaks, with salt and pepper, lye
Like Nunnes with patches in a monastrie.
Prophaneness in a conclave? Nay, much more
Idolatrie in crust! Babylon's whore
Rak'd from the grave, and bak'd by hanches, then
Serv'd up in coffins to unholy men;

=== From the Stuarts to seventeenth century ===
With the Stuart Restoration in 1660, the ban on Christmas was lifted and the seasonal celebrations returned to normal. The mince pie moved towards being a small, individual size, rather than for sharing among several people. On Christmas Day 1666 the writer Samuel Pepys recorded that he "Lay pretty long in bed, and then rose, leaving my wife desirous to sleep, having sat up till four this morning seeing her mayds make mince-pies." After church he "dined well on some good ribs of beef roasted and mince pies". The Gentleman's Magazine of 1733 described the crust of the "Christmas Pye" as a symbol of "the martial genius of our nation. The rules of military architecture are observed, and each of them would serve for the model of a fortification". The article continued that it provided a religious significance too. This was confirmed to the pseudonymous writer by:

... the zealous opposition it meets from the Quakers, who distinguish their feasts by an heretical sort of pudding ... and inveigh against Christmas Pye as an invention of the Scarlet Whore of Babylon, an hodge-podge of superstition, popery, the devil and all his works.

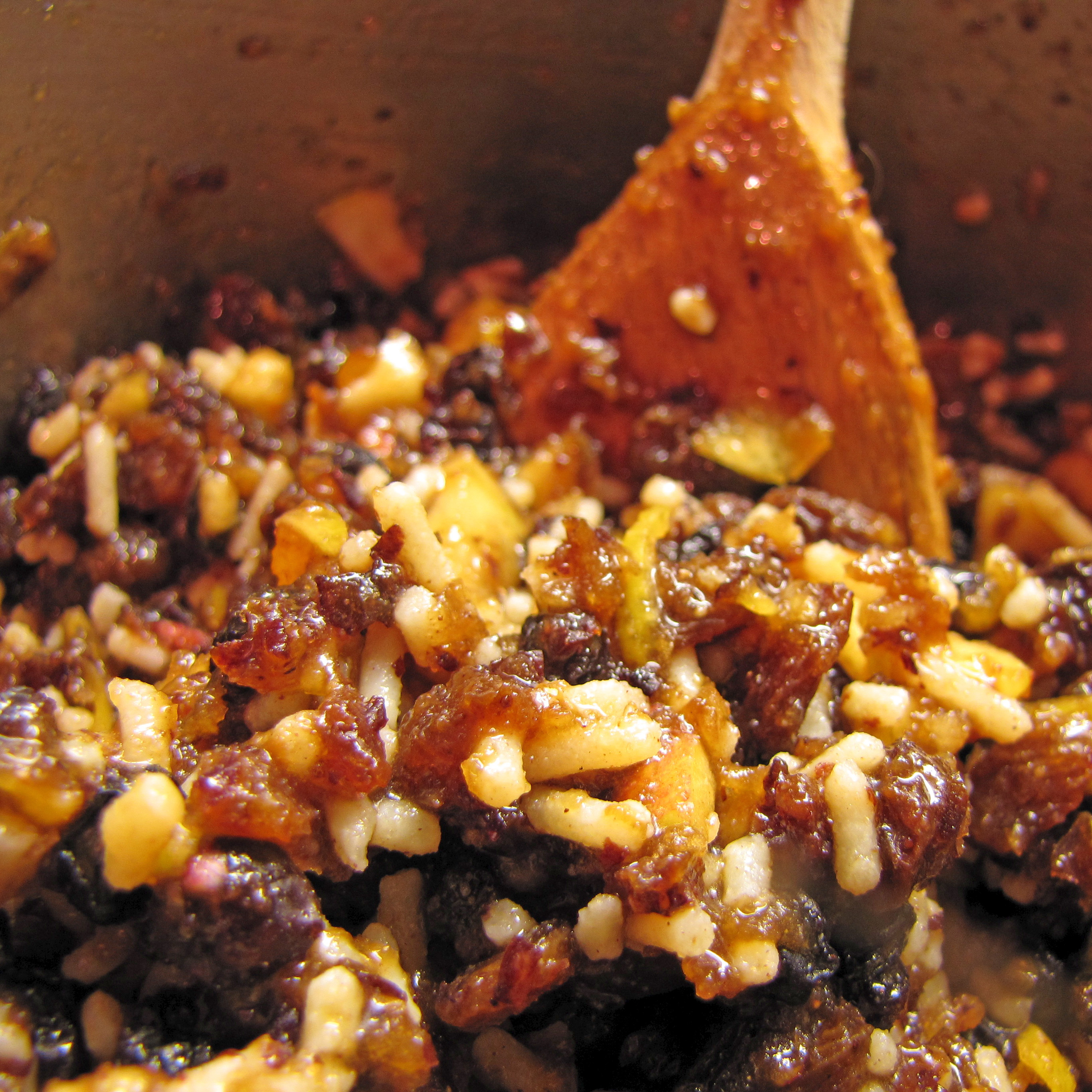
Mincemeat, the filling for the mince pie

The recipe for the mince pie was taken to the Americas by settlers to the New England Colonies. It was the habit of New Englanders to put cider and molasses on their pies. (Note: In North America, "cider" is the name given to non-alcoholic unfiltered apple juice.) While the pie's connection with Christmas was retained, it became a staple part of Thanksgiving dinner during the 1600s. Reviewing the historical consumption of the mince pie in the US, the activist Sarah Josepha Hale wrote in 1851:

The custom of eating mince pies at Christmas ... was too firmly rooted for the "Pilgrim Fathers" to abolish; so it would be vain for me to attempt it. At Thanksgiving too, they are considered indispensable; but I may be allowed to hope that during the remainder of the year, this rich, expensive and exceedingly unhealthy diet will be used very sparingly ... For children they should be forbidden food; so tempting is the taste, that the only security consists in not tasting.

=== From the eighteenth to the twenty-first centuries ===
Advertisement for pre-made mincemeat, 1903

During the eighteenth century the British plantations in the West Indies provided cheap sugar, which led to the mince pie becoming more sweet than savoury; recipes of the time, such as that by Hannah Glasse, included far more sugar than those of Fettiplace, for example. Glasse's recipe also said the meat was optional; in her case she suggested ox tongue. (Note: Glasse recommends making the mincemeat without meat (but including the suet) up to four months in advance. When the time comes to make the pies, the meat—in her case she suggests neat's tongue—can then be added to the mincemeat filling.) Ox tongue was the most common meat component of mince pie recipes in the eighteenth and nineteenth centuries. Other recipes called for various other meat, including beef, calves feet or mutton. By the following century the mince pie tended to be the small circular pie eaten in the twenty-first century; they were normally produced with bases of shortcrust pastry and lids of puff pastry.

In 1854 the French chef Alexis Soyer provided the recipe made for Queen Victoria every year, which included 300 pounds (140 kg) of beef and 72 bottles of brandy. (Note: The recipe, which was included in his book A Shilling Cookery for the People, comprises 240 pounds (110 kg) of raisins, 400 pounds (180 kg) of currants, 200 pounds (91 kg) of lump sugar, 3 pounds (1.4 kg) of cinnamon, 3 pounds (1.4 kg) of nutmeg, 3 pounds (1.4 kg) of cloves, 3 pounds (1.4 kg) of ground allspice, 2 pounds (0.91 kg) of ginger, 300 pounds (140 kg) of beef, 350 pounds (160 kg) of suet, 24 bushels of apples, 240 lemons, 30 pounds (14 kg) of cedrat (a variety of lemon) 72 bottles of brandy, 3 pounds (1.4 kg) of mace, 60 pounds (27 kg) of lemon peel and 60 pounds (27 kg) of orange peel. The mixture is made a month before it is needed.) The first edition of Mrs. Beeton's Book of Household Management (1861) contained two recipes for mince pies, one with meat, one with fruit (although both still requiring the use of suet). The first contains 1.5 pounds (0.68 kg) of lean beef, 3 pounds (1.4 kg) of beef suet, 2 pounds (0.91 kg) of raisins and 3 pounds (1.4 kg) of currants; the second requires 3 large lemons, 3 large apples, 1 pound (0.45 kg) of stoned raisins, 1 pound (0.45 kg) of currants and 1 pound (0.45 kg) of suet. (Note: Both recipes also require sugar, candied peel and brandy.) In the American food tradition the food historians Keith Stavely and Kathleen Fitzgerald surveyed US-published cookery books from before their civil war (ie, pre-1861), of those books that contained mince pie recipes, about half contained both meat and meat-free mince pie recipes; the remainder were just meat-based. The meat-free versions were often titled "mock mince pies".

Through the nineteenth-century recipes were increasingly without meat—although still included suet—but there were still some meat recipes being published in the twentieth and twenty-first century. This includes a 1909 issue of the Belfast Morning News, Jane Grigson's 1974 book English Food—in which she encouraged people to cook Mrs Beeton's meat-filled mince pie recipe—and Tom Kerridge's 2014 recipe in The Guardian, which included minced pork.

== Global consumption ==
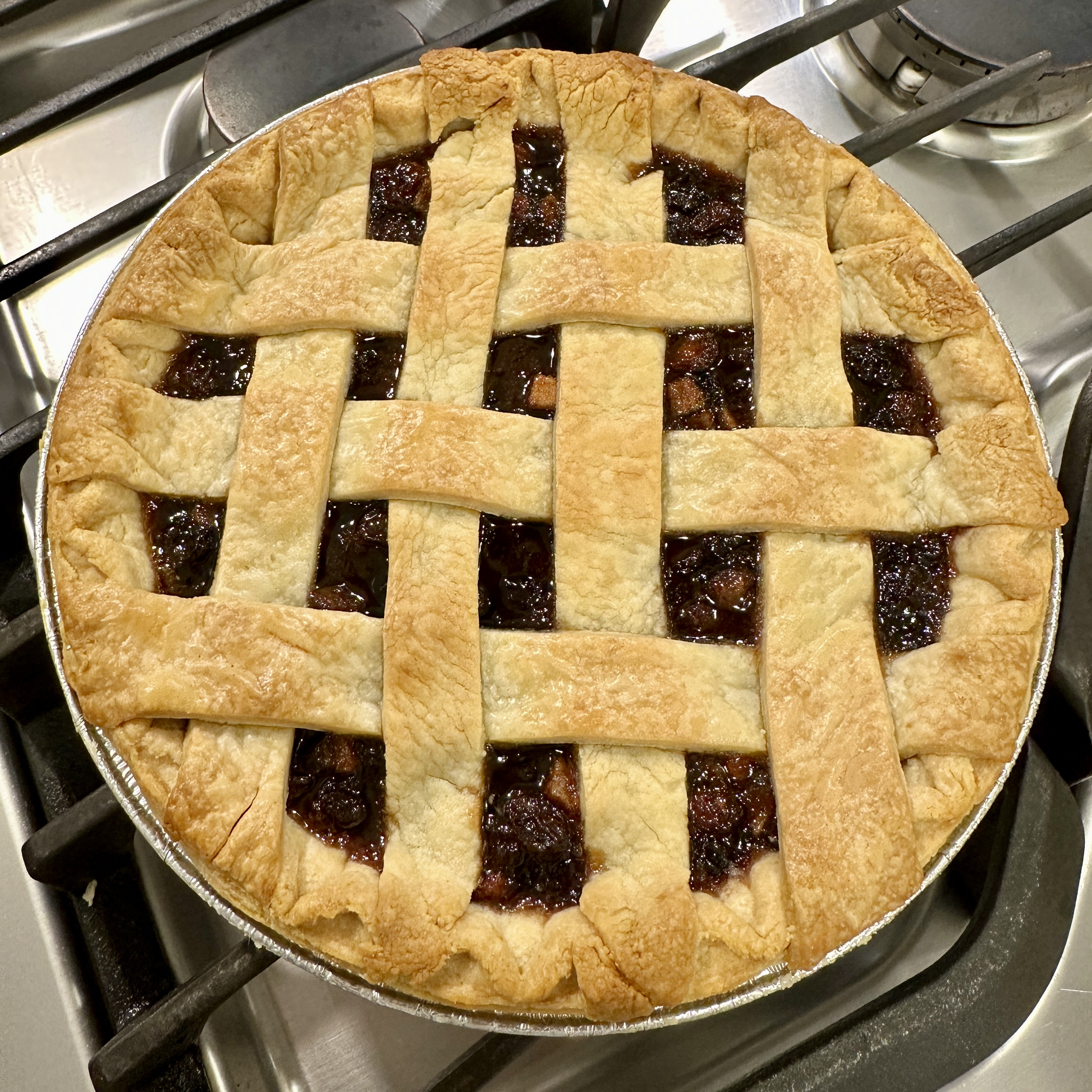
Large mince pie with a lattice top

Mince pies are found across the English-speaking world, although "enthusiasm for them is variable outside of the British Isles", according to the food historian Laura Mason.

In the US, the mince pie also became included in Thanksgiving celebrations, although the dish was never as popular as it was in the UK. Early American editions of Glasse's The Art of Cookery Made Plain and Easy (1805) omitted the recipe for mince pies that had been present in the British edition. The food historian Cathy Kaufman suggests that the omission may have been because the recipes were too strongly associated with southern Loyalists and, therefore, too British. Early American cookery books, such as those by Eliza Leslie included meat-based mince pie recipes; her 1837 book Directions for Cookery, in its Various Branches included two recipes for mince pies: one for bullock heart, one for tongue. The mince pie was considered the national dish of America until the 1940s, when apple pie rose in popularity. One American practice was to set the mince pie on fire—either to burn off any remaining alcohol within the pie or to caramelise the sugar—something Leslie thought in 1857 was a "foolish custom" that is "considered ungenteel and tavern-like". During the American prohibition years, food was exempt from the alcohol ban, and the level of alcohol in tinned mincemeat rose to over 14 per cent in some cases.

An early Canadian cookery book, The Frugal Housewife's Manual, published in 1840, includes a recipe for mince pies (which uses 2 pounds (0.91 kg) of beef). In Australia and New Zealand, colonial settlers made mince pies and the dish is still eaten over the Christmas period in the twenty-first century.

== Lenten mince pies ==
During the Elizabethan era, when meatless dishes were required during the period of Lent, mince pies containing fish or eggs were eaten; the lids of the pies were sugared before being served. The practice continued into the eighteenth century; Glasse included a recipe for an egg-based Lent mince pie in her 1748 work.

== Traditions, superstitions and cultural impact ==
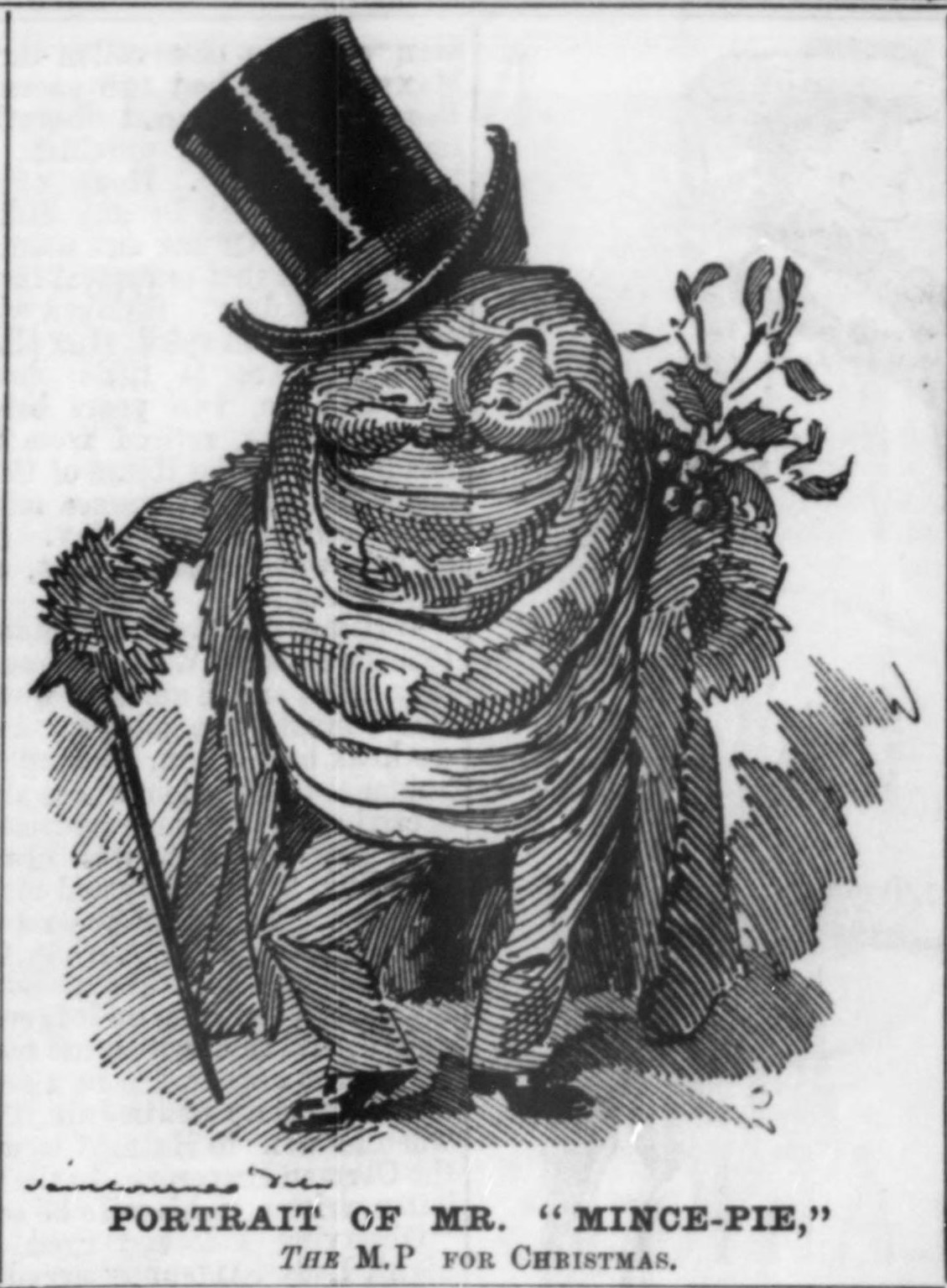
Punch depicted an anthropomorphic mince pie as "the MP for Christmas"

For many people, the mince pie is closely associated with the yule tradition. It is not known exactly when the pie became so closely connected with the season—although probably by the Elizabethan era—and in 1893 the humorous magazine Punch produced a cartoon showing a mince pie as the "MP for Christmas". The food historian Madeline Shanahan describes the mince pie as "one of Christmas's most iconic dishes", and a 2025 a poll showed that forty-four per cent of people in Britain thought the mince pie epitomised the taste of Christmas.

Because of its long history and deep connections to Christmas, much folklore has developed around the mince pie. Some sources state that the spices used in mincemeat represents the gifts given to Jesus by the Magi; others state that the Elizabethans would shape their mince pies to represent Jesus's manger, complete with a pastry model of Jesus on top. Shanahan and the food historian Laura Mason observe that there is little evidence to support either of these pieces of folklore, and the earliest reference to the crib shape dates from the seventeenth-century.

Several traditions and superstitions have also arisen around the mince pie. One is that it is lucky to eat as many mince pies as possible before Christmas. Another is that you should eat a mince pie on each of the twelve days of Christmas; each pie eaten meant a month of happiness in the coming year. For some people a mince pie should never be cut, or one's luck is cut, and others think it is bad luck to refuse to eat a mince pie that has been offered to you. Others are that one should always make a wish when you have your first mince pie and that each mince pie one eats makes a wish come true.

Mince pies are Cockney rhyming slang for "eyes", with such use dating back to the 1850s.

== See also ==
- Black bun, a Scottish fruit cake covered in pastry
- Yorkshire Christmas pie

== Notes and references ==
=== Sources ===
==== Books ====
- Appelbaum, Diana Karter (1984). Thanksgiving: An American Holiday, an American History. New York: Facts On File. ISBN 978-0-8719-6974-3.
- Aresty, Esther (1964). The Delectable Past. New York: Simon & Schuster. OCLC 729994.
- Ayto, John (1990). The Glutton's Glossary. London: Routledge. ISBN 978-0-4150-2647-5.
- Bailey, Adrian (1969). The Cooking of the British Isles. New York: Time-Life. OCLC 27038856.
- Beard, James (2007). Beard on Food: The Best Recipes and Kitchen Wisdom from the Dean of American Cooking. New York: Bloomsbury. ISBN 978-1-5969-1446-9.
- Beeton, Mrs (1861). The Book of Household Management. London: S. O. Beeton. OCLC 1086791502.
- Brand, John (1877). Observations on the Popular Antiquities of Great Britain: Chiefly Illustrating the Origin of our Vulgar and Provincial Customs, Ceremonies and Superstitions. London: George Bell. OCLC 833764082.
- Clarkson, Janet (2009). Pie: A Global History. London: Reaktion Books. ISBN 978-1-8618-9425-0.
- Davidson, Alan (2014). The Oxford Companion to Food. New York: Oxford University Press. ISBN 978-0-1996-7733-7.
- Dent, Susie, ed. (2018). Brewer's Dictionary of Phrase and Fable. London: Chambers. ISBN 978-1-4736-7636-7.
- Fletcher, Robert (1970). Woodward, D. H. (ed.). The Poems and Translations of Robert Fletcher. Gainesville, Florida: University of Florida Press. SBN 813-00279-6.
- Glasse, Hannah (1748). The Art of Cookery Made Plain and Easy (Third ed.). London: Published by the author. OCLC 938365682.
- Hale, Sarah Josepha (1996). Early American Cookery: "The Good Housekeeper", 1841. Mineola, New York: Dover Publications. ISBN 978-0-4862-9296-0.
- Howard, Henry (1708). England's Newest Way in all Sorts of Cookery, Pastry and all Pickles that are Fit to be Used. London: Chr. Coningsby. OCLC 560314232.
- Hughes, Glyn (2016). The Lost Feast of Christmas. Winster, Derbyshire: Foods of England. ISBN 978-1-3267-7755-5.
- Iacovetta, Franca (2012). "Food Acts and Cultural Politics: Women and the Gendered Dialectics of Culinary Pluralism at the International Institute of Toronto, 1950s-1960s". In Iacovetta, Franca (ed.). Edible Histories, Cultural Politics: Towards a Canadian Food History. Toronto: University of Toronto Press. pp. 359–386. ISBN 978-1-4426-4476-2.
- Krythe, Maynie R. (1954). All About Christmas. New York: Harper. OCLC 601598.
- La Sagne, René (2008). The Complete Book of Mince: Cordon Brun Recipes for all the Family. New Lanark, Lanarkshire: Waverley Books. ISBN 978-1-9024-0774-6.
- Leslie, Eliza (1837). Directions for Cookery: Being a System of the Art, in its Various Branches. Philadelphia, Pennsylvania: E. L. Carey & A. Hart. OCLC 1141424040.
- Leslie, Eliza (1857). Miss Leslie's New Cookery Book. Philadelphia, Pennsylvania: T. B. Peterson. OCLC 1621001.
- Markham, Gervase (1623). The English Huswife. London: R. Jackson. OCLC 834791668.
- Mason, Laura (2015). "Mince Pies". In Goldstein, Darra (ed.). The Oxford Companion to Sugar and Sweets. New York: Oxford University Press. pp. 456–457. ISBN 978-0-19-931339-6.
- Opie, Iona; Tatem, Moira (1990). A Dictionary of Superstitions. Oxford: Oxford University Press. ISBN 0192115979.
- Paston-Williams, Sara (1993). The Art of Dining: A History of Cooking & Eating. Oxford: Past Times. ISBN 978-0-7078-0272-5.
- Pepys, Samuel (2004) [1921]. Le Gallienne, Richard (ed.). Diary of Samuel Pepys: Selected Passages. Mineola, New York: Dover Publications. ISBN 978-0-4864-3667-8.
- Shanahan, Madeline (2019). Christmas Food and Feasting: A History. Lanham, Maryland: Rowman & Littlefield. ISBN 978-1-4422-7697-0.
- Skinner, Julia (2012). Flavours of... Cumbria: Recipes. Dinton, Wiltshire: The Francis Frith Collection. ISBN 978-1-8458-9693-5.
- Soyer, Alexis (1855). A Shilling Cookery for the People: Embracing an Entirely New System of Plain Cookery and Domestic Economy. London: Geo. Routledge & Co. OCLC 681727965.
- Spurling, Hilary (1987). Elinor Fettiplace's Receipt Book. Harmondsworth, Middlesex: Penguin. ISBN 978-0-1400-8828-1.
- Spurr, John (2006). The Post-Reformation: Religion, Politics and Society in Britain, 1603-1714. Harlow, Essex: Pearson Longman. ISBN 0582319064.
- Stavely, Keith; Fitzgerald, Kathleen (2004). America's Founding Food: The Story of New England Cooking. Chapel Hill, North Carolina: University of North Carolina Press. ISBN 978-1-4696-2714-4.
- Stavely, Keith; Fitzgerald, Kathleen (2011). Northern Hospitality: Cooking by the Book in New England. Amherst, Massachusetts: University of Massachusetts Press. ISBN 978-1-5584-9861-7.
- Strause, Monroe Boston (1936). How to Make Better Pies. Chicago, Illinois: Baker's Helper Co. OCLC 936484241.
- Struthers, Jane (2008). Pies: Recipes, History & Snippets. London: Ebury. ISBN 978-0-0919-3019-6.
- Weaver, William Woys (1990). The Christmas Cook: Three Centuries of American Yuletide Sweets. New York: HarperPerennial. ISBN 978-0-06-055212-1.
- Williams, Victoria (2024). Food Cultures of Great Britain: Cuisine, Customs, and Issues. New York: Bloomsbury Academic. ISBN 978-1-4408-7741-4.
- Wilson, C. Anne (1976). Food and Drink in Britain: From the Stone Age to Recent Times. Harmondsworth, London: Penguin. ISBN 978-0-1405-5101-3.
- Ysewijn, Regula (2020). Oats in the North, Wheat from the South: The History of British Baking, Savoury and Sweet. Sydney, New South Wales: Murdoch Books. ISBN 978-1-9116-3264-1.

==== Journals and magazines ====
- Atkins, Anne (1982). "'We all Want Some Figgy Pudding'". Petits Propos Culinaires. 12: 40–45. doi:10.1558/ppc.29657.
- Chao, Tien-Yi (1 March 2025). "The Portrayal and Politics of Mince Pies in English Satirical Texts, 1642-1660". EurAmerica. 55 (1): 61–105. doi:10.7015/JEAS.202503_55(1).0002.
- Kaufman, Cathy (2004). "The Ideal Christmas Dinner". Gastronomica. 4 (4): 17–24. doi:10.1525/gfc.2004.4.4.17.
- Philo-Clericus (December 1733). "On Christmas Pye". The Gentleman's Magazine. Vol. 3, no. 12. pp. 652–653.
- "Portrait of Mr Mince Pie, MP for Christmas". Punch. Vol. 105. 30 December 1893. p. 301.

==== News ====
- Cloake, Felicity; Ebuehi, Benjamina (6 December 2025). "'A Malevolent Festive Jammie Dodger': The Best (and Worst) Supermarket Mince Pies, Tasted and Rated". The Guardian.
- Hirst, Christopher (4 December 2011). "Sweet Delight: A Brief History of the Mince Pie". The Independent.
- Hume, Robert (2 December 2024). "Mince Pie Anyone? The History of a Seasonal Favourite". Irish Examiner.
- Kerridge, Tom; Holland, Mina (21 December 2014). "Tom Kerridge's London Recipes". The Guardian. Archived from the original on 26 August 2025.

==== Websites ====
- Bilton, Sam (18 December 2015). "Meat to Sweet: A History of the Mince Pie". English Heritage. Archived from the original on 1 November 2025.
- "Cedrat". Oxford English Dictionary (online ed.). Oxford University Press. doi:10.1093/OED/1086842541. (Subscription or participating institution membership required.)
- Dobson, Matt (5 January 2026). "Christmas Packaging Facts and Waste Statistics (2026 Update)". GWP Group. Archived from the original on 6 March 2026.
- Doerksen, Cliff (17 December 2009). "The Real American Pie". Chicago Reader. Archived from the original on 12 February 2026.
- Dutczak, Sandy (22 December 2022). "On This Day 25 December 1647 – Christmas was Cancelled". Institute of Advanced Legal Studies.
- Macdonald, Rory (18 December 2019). "The Curious History of the Mince Pie". Institute of Culinary Education. Archived from the original on 5 August 2025.
- "Mince". Oxford English Dictionary (online ed.). Oxford University Press. (Subscription or participating institution membership required.)
- "Mince Pie". Oxford English Dictionary (online ed.). Oxford University Press. (Subscription or participating institution membership required.)
- "Minced Pie". Oxford English Dictionary (online ed.). Oxford University Press. (Subscription or participating institution membership required.)
- "Morrisons Celebrates First Ever 'National Mince Pie Day' with Thousands of Free Bakes for Brits". Morrisons. 17 November 2025. Archived from the original on 15 December 2025.
- Parish, Helen (12 December 2016). "Christmas 2016: The History of the Humble Mince Pie". Reading History. University of Reading. Archived from the original on 10 June 2023.
- "Receipt and Recipe". British Library. Archived from the original on 19 February 2020.
