= Scotch pie =

Meat pie

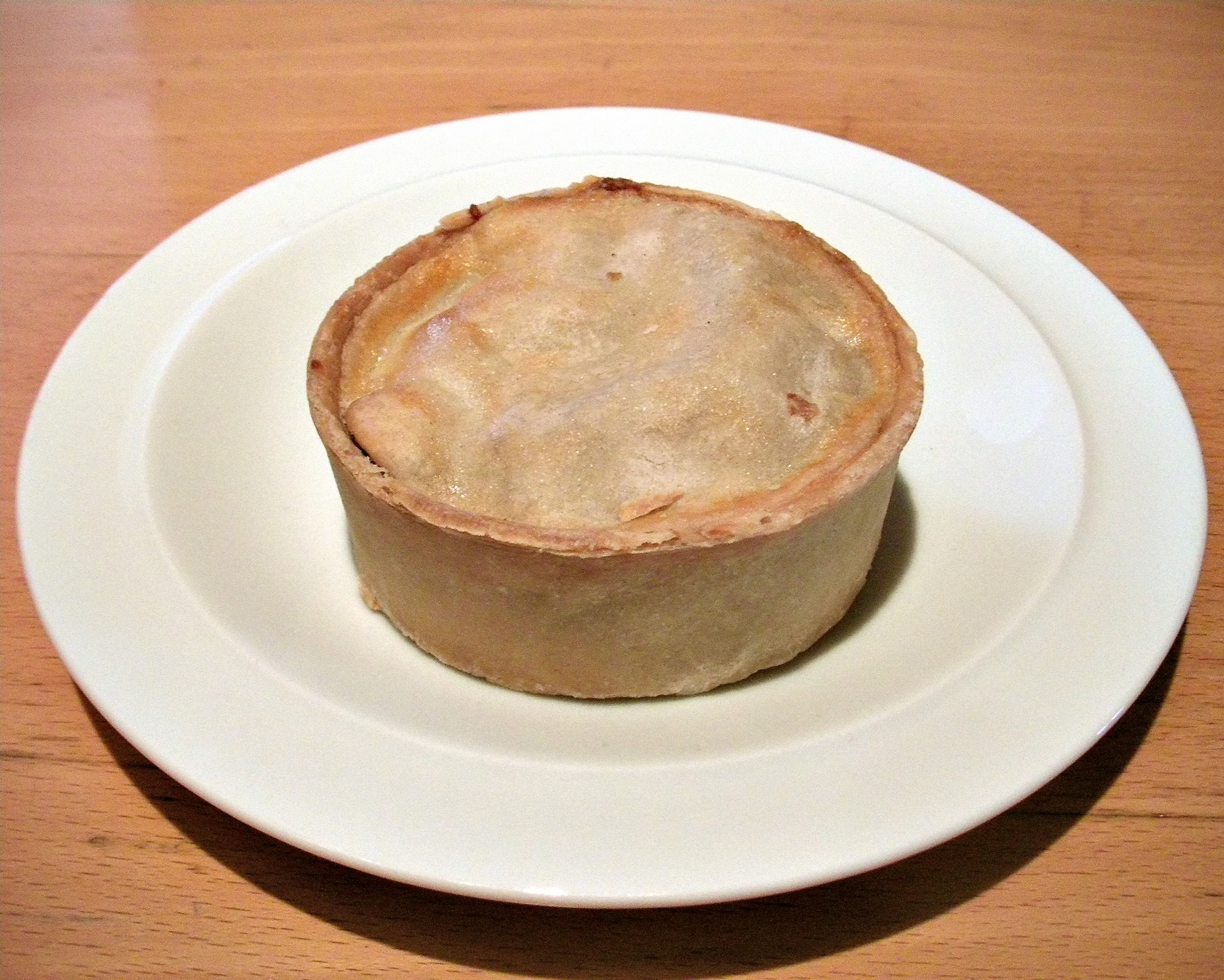
- A cooked, intact Scotch pie
- Alternative names: Mutton pie, shell pie, mince pie, football pie
- Type: Meat pie
- Place of origin: Scotland
- Serving temperature: Hot or cold
- Main ingredients: Mutton or other meat, hot water crust pastry

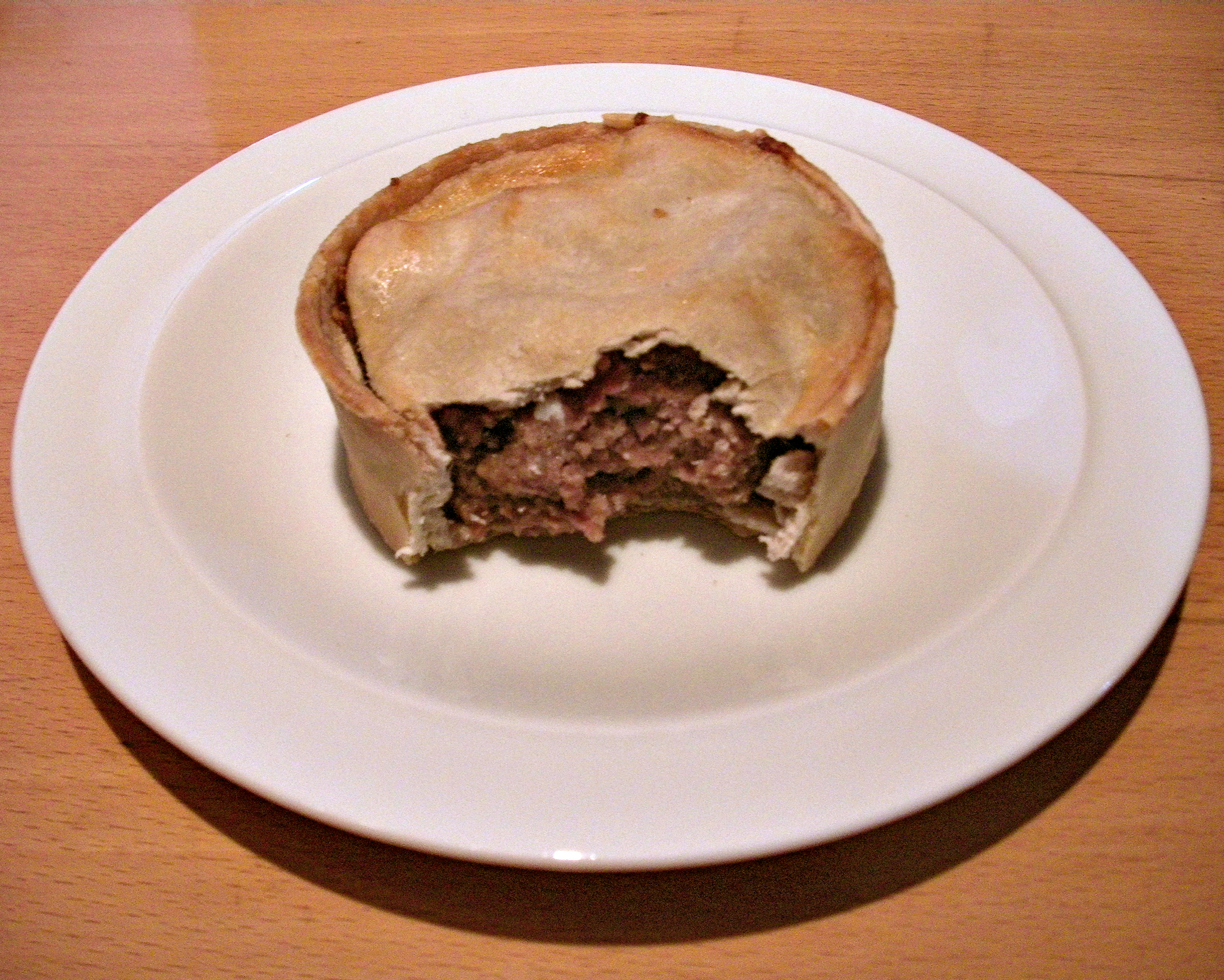
The same pie, partially eaten

A Scotch pie is a meat pie, made with a hot water crust pastry, traditionally filled with minced mutton (whereby also called a mutton pie) but now generally beef, sometimes lamb. It may also be known as a shell pie. The Scotch pie originated in Scotland, but can be found in other parts of the United Kingdom and abroad.

== Consumption ==
Scotch pies are often sold alongside other types of hot food in football grounds, traditionally accompanied by a drink of Bovril, resulting in the occasional reference to football pies. They are also often served hot by take-away restaurants and bakeries and at outdoor events. The hard crust enables it to be eaten by hand with no wrapping.

== Ingredients and design ==
The traditional filling of mutton is often highly spiced with black pepper and other ingredients and is placed inside a shell of hot water crust pastry. It is baked in a round, straight-sided tin, about 8 cm in diameter and 4 cm high, and the top "crust" (which is soft) is placed about 1 cm lower than the rim to make a space for adding accompaniments such as mashed potatoes, baked beans, brown sauce, gravy or an egg. Typically, there is a round hole of about 7.5 mm in the centre of the top crust.

== Competition ==
Every year, since 1999, Scottish Bakers, a trade association, hold the World Championship Scotch Pie Awards. The winner of the Scotch pie section of the competition is judged to be the World Champion.

The Kandy Bar, a Scottish bakery chain, has been the overall winners in the World Championship Scotch Pie Awards three times in 2014, 2016, and 2024. In an interview in 2016, The Kandy Bar claimed to be producing 1,200 Scotch pies a day, with 1,600 on Saturdays. Shortly after winning the Scotch Pie World Champion title in 2016 there was a "natural surge of customers from far afield".

== See also ==
- List of lamb dishes
- List of pies, tarts and flans
- Killie pie – Scottish steak and gravy pie
- Rabbit pie – Food consisting of rabbit meat in a gravy
