= Mincemeat =

Mixture of dried fruit, spices and fat

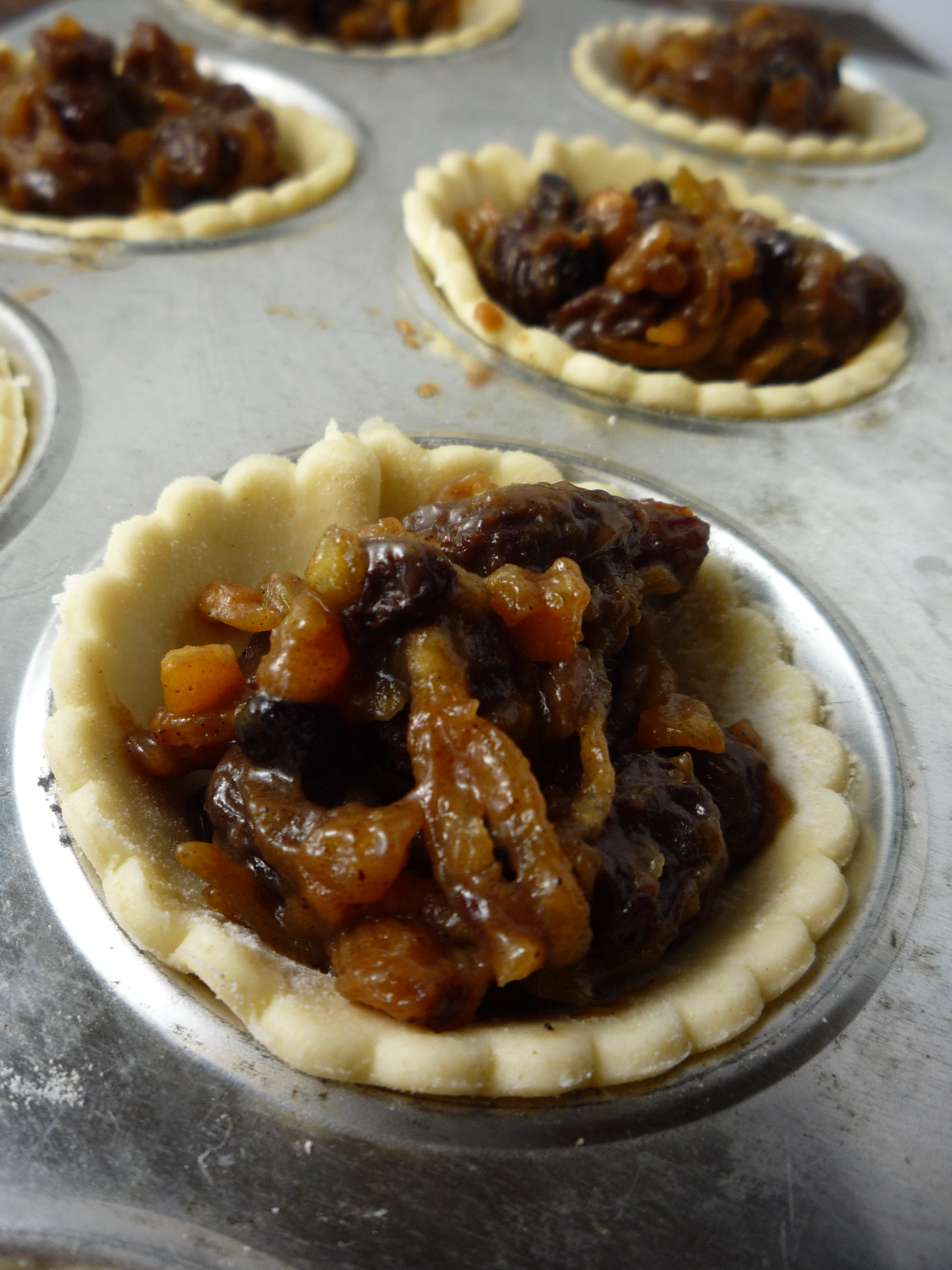
Mince pie filled with mincemeat

Mincemeat is a mixture of chopped apples and dried fruit, distilled spirits or vinegar, spices, and optionally, meat and beef suet. Mincemeat is usually used as a pie or pastry filling. Traditional mincemeat recipes contain meat, notably beef or venison, as this was a way of preserving meat prior to modern preservation methods. Modern recipes often replace the suet with vegetable shortening or other oils (e.g., coconut oil) or omit the meat. However, many people continue to prepare and serve the traditional meat-based mincemeat for holidays.

== Etymology ==
The "mince" in mincemeat comes from the Middle English mincen, and the Old French mincier both traceable to the Vulgar Latin minutiare, meaning chop finely. The word mincemeat is an adaptation of an earlier term minced meat, meaning finely chopped meat. Meat was also a term for food in general, not only animal flesh.

== Variants and history ==
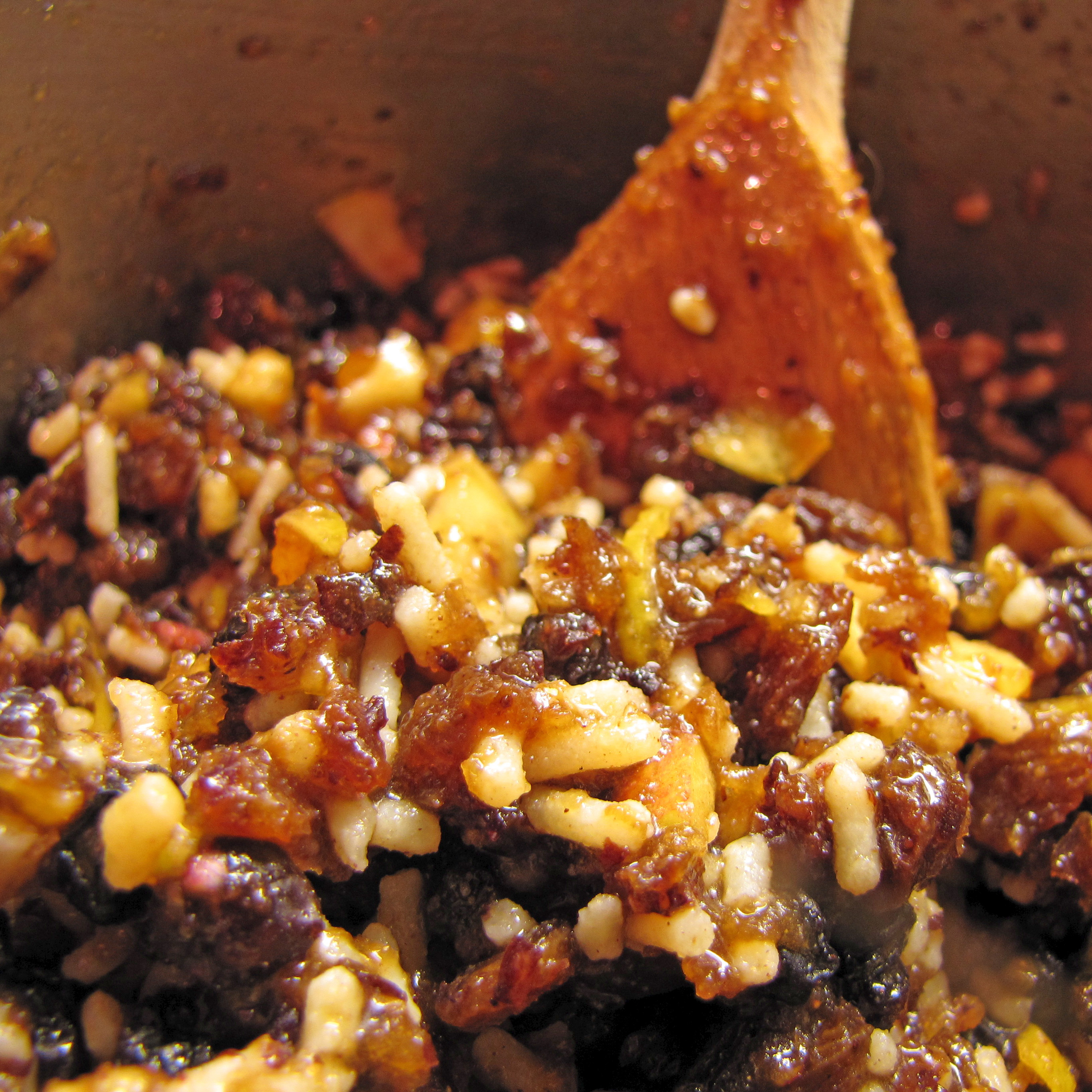
Mincemeat

English recipes from the 15th, 16th, and 17th centuries describe a fermented mixture of meat and fruit used as a pie filling. These early recipes included vinegars and wines, but by the 18th century, distilled spirits, frequently brandy, were often substituted. The use of spices like clove, nutmeg, mace and cinnamon was common in late medieval and renaissance meat dishes. The increase of sweetness from added sugar made mincemeat less a savoury dinner course and helped to direct its use toward desserts.

=== 16th-century recipe ===
Pyes of mutton or beif must be fyne mynced & seasoned with pepper and salte and a lytel saffron to colour it / suet or marrow a good quantitie / a lytell vynegre / pruynes / great reasons / and dates / take the fattest of the broath of powdred beefe. And if you will have paest royall / take butter and yolkes of egges & so to temper the floure to make the paest. Pies of mutton or beef must be finely minced and seasoned with pepper and salt, and a little saffron to colour it. [Add] a good quantity of suet or marrow, a little vinegar, prunes, raisins and dates. [Put in] the fattest of the broth of salted beef. And, if you want Royal pastry, take butter and egg yolks and [combine them with] flour to make the paste.

In the mid- to late eighteenth century, mincemeat in Europe had become associated with old-fashioned, rural, or homely foods. Victorian England rehabilitated the preparation as a traditional Yuletide treat.

=== 19th-century recipe ===
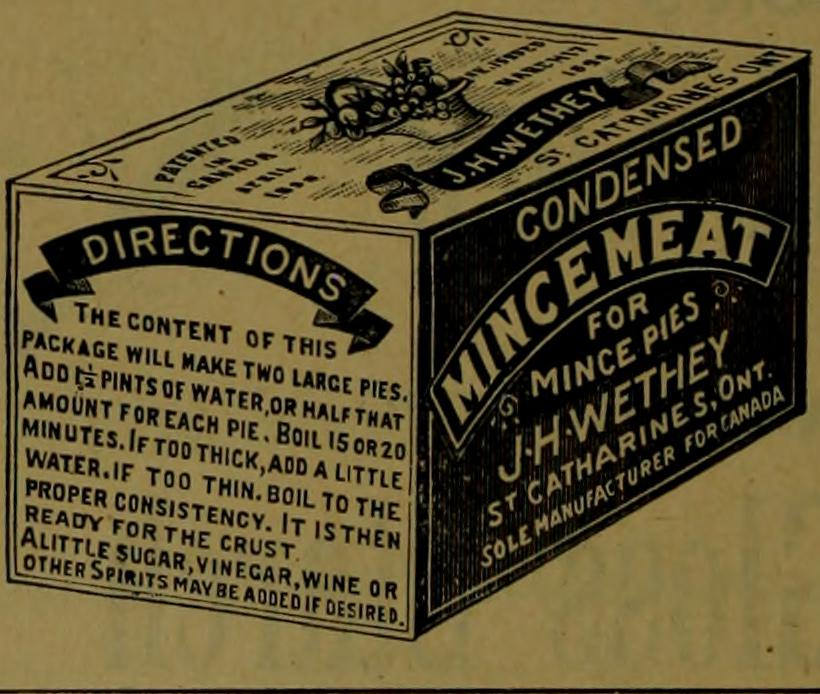
Late-19th-century commercial mincemeat package

Ingredients – 2 lb. of raisins, 3 lb. currants, 1 1/2 lb. of lean beef, 3 lb. of beef suet, 2 lb. of moist sugar, 2 oz. of citron, 2 oz. of candied lemon-peel, 2 oz. of candied orange-peel, 1 small nutmeg, 1 pottle of apples, the rind of 2 lemons, the juice of 1, 1/2 pint of brandy.

Mode – Stone and cut the raisins once or twice across, but do not chop them; wash, dry, and pick the currants free from stalks and grit, and mince the beef and suet, taking care the latter is chopped very fine; slice the citron and candied peel, grate the nutmeg, and pare, core, and mince the apples; mince the lemon-peel, strain the juice, and when all the ingredients are thus prepared, mix them well together, adding the brandy when the other things are well blended; press the whole into a jar, carefully exclude the air, and the mincemeat will be ready for use in a fortnight.

=== Apple mincemeat ===
By the late 19th century, "apple mincemeat" was recommended as a "hygienic" alternative, using apples, suet, currants, brown sugar, raisins, allspice, orange juice, lemons, mace and apple cider, but no meat.

A recipe for apple mincemeat appears in a 1910 issue of The Irish Times, made with apples, suet, currants, sugar, raisins, orange juice, lemons, spice and brandy.

There is also a similar recipe using green tomatoes instead of apples to create mincemeat in the 1970s book Putting Food By.

== 20th century ==
By the mid-twentieth century, most mincemeat recipes did not include meat, but might include animal fat in the form of suet or butter, or alternatively solid vegetable fats, making it vegan. Some recipes continue to include venison, minced beef sirloin or minced heart, along with dried fruit, spices, chopped apple, fresh citrus peel, Zante currants, candied fruits, citron, and brandy, rum, or other liquor. Mincemeat is aged to deepen flavours, with alcohol changing the overall texture of the mixture by breaking down the meat proteins. Preserved mincemeat may be stored for up to ten years.

Mincemeat can be produced at home. Commercial preparations, primarily without meat, packaged in jars, foil-lined boxes, or tins, are commonly available.

Mince pies and tarts are frequently consumed during the Christmas holiday season. In the northeast United States, mincemeat pies are also a traditional part of the Thanksgiving holiday.

Like other pies, mince pies are sometimes served with cheese, notably cheddar.
