= Hot water crust pastry =

Pastry dough made using hot water

Hot-water-crust pastry
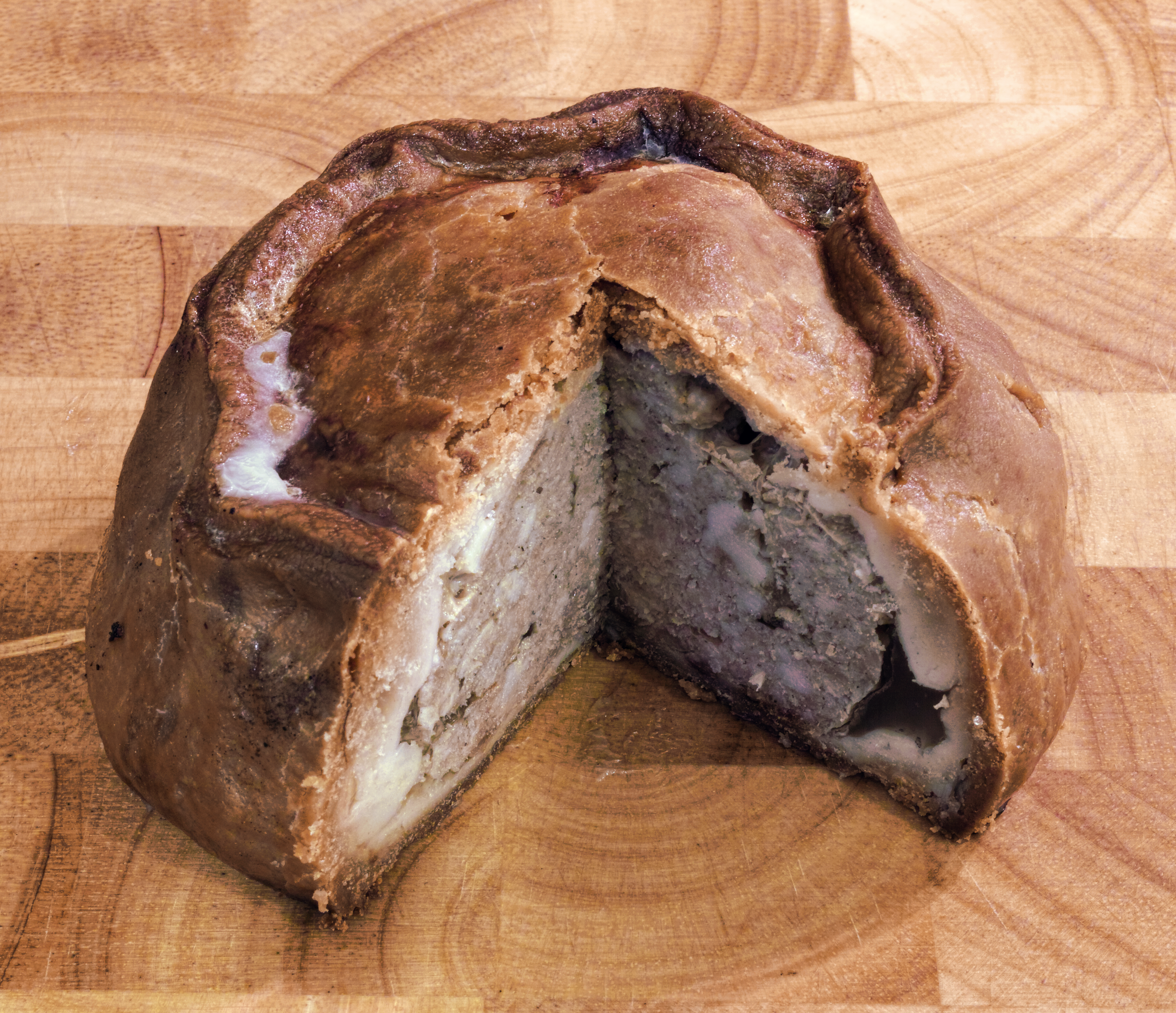
- Melton Mowbray pork pie made with hot-water-crust pastry
- Type: Pastry
- Place of origin: England
- Main ingredients: Hot water, lard, flour

Hot water crust is a type of pastry used for savoury pies, such as pork pies, game pies, Scotch pies and more rarely, steak and kidney pies. Hot water crust is traditionally used for producing hand-made pies.

As the name suggests, the pastry is made by heating water, melting the fat in it, bringing the mixture to a boil, and finally incorporating the flour. This can be done by beating the flour into the mixture in the pan, or by kneading on a pastry board. Either way, the result is a hot and rather sticky paste that can be used for hand-raising: shaping by hand, sometimes using a dish or bowl as an inner mould. The moulded crust retains its shape as it cools, and is prepared for baking with a filling and additional layer of pastry crust on top. Hand-raised hot-water-crust pastry does not produce a neat and uniform finish, as there will be sagging during the cooking of the filled pie. This is generally accepted as the mark of a hand-made pie. It is possible, however, to bake the pastry in a mould, as with other pies.

The pastry is often used to make pork pies or to enclose other heavy fillings, as, compared to other types of pastry, a hot water crust allows even very wet fillings to be held in.

== See also ==
- List of pastries
- Huff paste
- Raised pie
