= Christmas: A Biography =

2017 book by Judith Flanders

- Author: Judith Flanders
- Subject: History of Christmas
- Genre: History
- Publisher: Picador
- Publication date: 19 October 2017
- Pages: 256
- ISBN: 9781250118349 (hardcover)
- OCLC: 1036294860
- Dewey Decimal: 394.2663
- LC Class: GT4985.F58 2017

Christmas: A Biography is a 2017 book by Judith Flanders about the history of Christmas, released from Picador. Flanders suggests the holiday has been less about religion and more about celebration and enjoyment since its inception in the fourth century. The author describes the origins of Christmas festivities and its development over time, focusing on its cuisine, hospitality, and holiday music, all based on the contributions of multiple cultural traditions, culminating in the eventual modernisation and commercialisation of the holiday in the 19th and 20th centuries. Critics praised the book for its coverage and details but criticised its geographic bias towards North America and Europe and lack of analysis compared to her previous work.

== Contents ==
Christmas: A Biography starts by exploring what Flanders calls the "two most common assumptions" on the origins of the titular holiday: that it originated as "a deeply solemn religious event" before being distorted by "our own secular, capitalist society", and that it is native to the people who celebrate it. Conversely, it shows that, since coming into existence in the fourth century, the holiday has always been mostly secular and about celebration and enjoyment, and that several Christmas traditions instead vary in their era and place of origin.

After noting a lack of what Flanders calls "convincing evidence" of pagan winter solstice celebrations in Europe, it identifies Christmas' precursor as the winter solstice celebrations of Mithras, adopted by Christians for the 25 December celebration of the nativity of Jesus. It then explains how Christmas was initially "a time of feasting, drinking and carnival" even with warnings from archbishops against excessive consumption or unevenly-enforced restrictions by the Church of Scotland, reformers during the English Civil War, and the judiciary of the Puritan Massachusetts Bay Colony. In addition to British traditions, the book discusses American colonial celebrations like celebratory gunfire and Continental European traditions like the Dutch Sinterklaas and Finnish reindeer moccasins. The rise of modern Christmas amidst the trend of Merry England during the Victorian era is also explored, particularly the impact of the novelist Charles Dickens, who the book says is where "Christmas first meets the modern world".

Another aspect of the book is its sociological approach towards the holiday. Examples include the role of family hospitality and cuisine in Christmas festivities and the holiday's shift towards being family-oriented, as well as the evolution of commonplace trends like gifting and Christmas trees and relatively newer traditions like Christmas cards, holiday tipping, and wrapping paper. Another area explored is the holiday's corporate impact, such as how department stores sought to economically benefit from the holiday; the growth of companies like F. W. Woolworth Company and Hallmark Cards; and the rise in popularity of modern depictions of Santa Claus due to The Coca-Cola Company's 1930s depictions of Santa. Additionally, it discusses Christmas-related mass media such as Christmas carols, music jingles, films, and theatrical performances, as well as the international exchange of Christmas traditions and the objects involved.

== Release and reception ==
Christmas: A Biography was released from Picador on 19 October 2017. An American edition was released from Thomas Dunne Books on 24 October. A year later, on 1 November 2018, Picador released an edition with a new title, Christmas: A History. Later that month, on 13 November, a Japanese-language translation by Harumi Itō, Christmas no Rekishi: Shukusai Tanjō no Nazo o Toku (クリスマスの歴史 : 祝祭誕生の謎を解く; lit. 'The History of Christmas: Solving the Mystery of the Celebration's Formation') was released from Hara Shobo.

Amy Bloom of The New York Times Book Review and Lucy Hughes-Hallett of The Guardian praised the book for its broader coverage. (Note: The relevant quote is that "Flanders has unearthed all sorts of interesting facts, none of them dull, the tower of them a bit overwhelming.") (Note: Hughes-Hallett said that the book "covers every aspect of Christmas") The Economist said that she "unwraps the holiday's history with the excitement and curiosity of a child opening gifts", and Malcolm Forbes of the Minnesota Star Tribune said that anyone who reads the book "comes away with a better understanding of, and even deeper appreciation for, this magical time of the year". Joan Curbow of The Booklist called it "well-researched", and Helen Davies of The Sunday Times commended the fact that the book has "more footnotes [...] than there are presents under a Rockefeller Christmas tree".

In addition to content and quality, the book also received praise for its potential impact on Christmas. Hugh Macdonald of The Herald commended the book for expanding on the meaning of Christmas despite its factual nature, as did Publishers Weekly, (Note: Macdonald says that the book "honours facts but exults in a realisation that there is another dimension to the phenomenon of Christmas") (Note: The relevant quote is: "Although Flanders' voice sometimes disappears amid the cascade of facts, her well-structured argument lays to rest the idea that the celebration of Christmas is solely religious") and Forbes said that it "manages to be not only a timely history of the festive season but also an overdue re-evaluation of some of the common assumptions about it". The Lancashire Evening Post described it as "the fascinating story of the festive season", and Kathleen Manning of U.S. Catholic praised it as "body armor when the war on Christmas shrapnel sprays".

Davies criticised the book for being too Eurocentric and Americentric and, citing the failure to explore the measurable rise in domestic violence and divorce during the Christmas holidays or the "humbugs who have vented their spleen over the festive season", being "a little rose-tinted". Furthermore, Hughes-Hallett called the book a departure from Flanders' analytical approach in her previous work, The Making of Home, describing it as "more of a catalogue of colourful information, as much of a ragbag of cultural references as Christmas itself, and as surprising an assortment of items as any you might find heaped up under a tree".
