= Judith Flanders =

British historian and writer

Judith Flanders (born 1959) is a historian, journalist and author based in London, England. Her writings centre on the Victorian period.

== Early life and education ==
Flanders was born to Jewish parents in London, England. She spent her childhood in Montreal, Canada, apart from a year in Israel in 1972. Flanders is graduate of Skidmore College in Saratoga Springs, New York. She moved to Britain after university, and worked as an editor for various London publishers.

She included a satirical account of her experiences in a crime novel, Writers' Block (2014), retitled A Murder of Magpies (2015).

== Career ==
As an author, Flanders concentrates on the Victorian period. Her book, A Circle of Sisters followed the lives of four female siblings and The Invention of Murder investigated crime of the era. Recently she has served as a narrator, historian, and advisor for the Ubisoft video game Assassin's Creed Syndicate.

Flanders also writes as an arts critic, on books, dance, art, and recently video games. Her work has appeared in The Sunday Telegraph, The Guardian, The Spectator and The Times Literary Supplement.

Flanders is a Senior Research Fellow in Nineteenth Century Social History at the University of Buckingham.

== Bibliography ==
=== Non-fiction ===
- Funnell, Peter; Flanders, Judith; National Portrait Gallery (Great Britain) (1996), Victorian Portraits in the National Portrait Gallery Collection, National Portrait Gallery, ISBN 978-1-85514-208-4
- Flanders, Judith (2001), A Circle of Sisters: Alice Kipling, Georgiana Burne-Jones, Agnes Poynter, and Louisa Baldwin, Viking, ISBN 978-0-670-88673-9
- Flanders, Judith (2003), The Victorian House: Domestic Life from Childbirth to Deathbed, HarperCollins, ISBN 0-00-713188-7; in the USA as: Flanders, Judith (2004), Inside the Victorian Home: A Portrait of Domestic Life in Victorian England, W. W. Norton, ISBN 978-0-393-05209-1
- Flanders, Judith (2006), Consuming Passions: Leisure and Pleasure in Victorian Britain, HarperPress, ISBN 0-00-717295-8
- Flanders, Judith (2011), The Invention of Murder: How the Victorians Revelled in Death and Detection and Created Modern Crime, HarperPress, ISBN 978-0-00-724888-9
- Flanders, Judith (2012), The Victorian City: Everyday Life in Dickens' London, Atlantic Books, ISBN 978-1-84887-795-5
- Flanders, Judith (2014),The Making of Home: The 500-Year Story of How Our Houses Became Our Homes, Atlantic Books
- Flanders, Judith (2017), Christmas: A Biography, St. Martin's Press, ISBN 9781250118349
- Flanders, Judith (2020), A Place For Everything: The Curious History of Alphabetical Order, Picador, ISBN 9781509881567
- Flanders, Judith (2024), Rites of Passage: Death and Mourning in Victorian Britain, Picador, ISBN 9781509816972

=== Sam Clair novels ===
- Flanders, Judith (2014), Writers' Block, Allison and Busby, ISBN 978-0749015237; published in the USA as (2015) A Murder of Magpies, St. Martin's Press, ISBN 9781250056450
- Flanders, Judith (2015), A Bed of Scorpions, Allison and Busby
- Flanders, Judith (2017), A Cast of Vultures, St. Martin's Press, ISBN 9781250087829
- Flanders, Judith (2018), A Howl of Wolves, St. Martin's Press, ISBN 9781250087836
