= Dantokpa Market =

Open-air market in Cotonou, Benin

The Dantokpa Market (Fon: Dantɔkpa), also known simply as Tokpa, is a large open-air marketplace in Cotonou, the economic capital of Benin. It is one of the country's principal wholesale and retail trading centres and has been described as the largest open-air market in West Africa.

== Presentation ==
The name Dantokpa is written Dantɔkpa in the Fon language. It is interpreted as meaning "on the banks of the lagoon of Dan". In Beninese traditional religious beliefs, Dan is a divinity represented by a serpent and associated with prosperity and abundance.

An altar dedicated to Dan is located within the market.

=== Location and infrastructure ===
Dantokpa Market is located in Cotonou, close to the lagoon and major transport routes. It was initially developed on approximately 12 hectares (30 acres) in 1963. By 2010, the occupied area had reached approximately 18.7 hectares (46 acres), with commercial activities extending into neighbouring residential areas.

Other estimates based on a broader definition of the market area describe it as occupying more than 20 hectares (49 acres).

The market succeeded an earlier Tokpa market located near the former bridge in Cotonou. Its main building measures approximately 66 metres (217 ft) by 44 metres (144 ft) and has several levels. It was designed to contain about 1,100 rental stalls and shops. Larger shops in the formal section cover approximately 25 square metres (270 sq ft).

The market's location beside the lagoon allows merchandise to be transported by water between Cotonou and settlements around the lagoon.

==== Market zones ====
Dantokpa is divided into areas specialising in different categories of goods and services.

Food wholesalers operate alongside traders selling locally produced handicrafts, textiles and construction materials. Other sections specialise in spare parts, hardware, timber, reinforcing steel, cement and agricultural tools. The market also contains mechanical repair workshops as well as millers, mattress makers, food vendors and carpenters.

Warehouses have also been built and placed under private management.

==== Infrastructure data ====
At the beginning of the 2000s, approximately 15,342 shops were recorded within the market area.

Buildings in surrounding residential areas have also been converted into storage spaces.

Commercial activity extends towards the lagoon, where waste and packaging generated by the market have accumulated along the shoreline.

Some small-scale traders sell food and other goods from temporary spaces occupying only a few square metres.

Dantokpa also contains areas where objects associated with Vodun and other traditional religious practices are sold, including wooden and metal objects, animal remains and ritual materials.

Historically, taxes and market fees collected from Dantokpa and other Cotonou markets represented 4.7 per cent of the revenue of the former urban district of Cotonou.

==== Vacant upper-floor shops ====
A substantial part of the upper levels of the main market building has historically remained unused. More than 80 per cent of the stalls on the first and second floors were reported to be unoccupied.

Around the main building, traders established structures known as apatams, small shelters made from bamboo, wood or other lightweight materials. These structures provide several thousand additional trading spaces.

Approximately 67 per cent of installations were classified as fixed and 33 per cent as mobile.

Some small wholesalers of imported rice operate from raised platforms known as kanter, erected along roads crossing the market. Traders using these installations pay a daily market fee.

=== Stages of growth ===
During the 1940s, the predecessor of Dantokpa Market, known as Tokpa, was located north of the former railway and road bridge in Cotonou. As the site became too small, the market was moved to Gbogbanou and later to its current location in 1963.

The Société de gestion des marchés autonomes states that activities at the current market site began in 1964.

The presence of a place of worship dedicated to Dan contributed to the adoption of the name Dantokpa.

During the 1970s, construction of the multi-storey main building did not prevent traders from establishing informal stalls and shelters around it.

During the 1980s, major infrastructure projects altered the layout of the market. Construction of a new bridge crossed part of the original trading area and required the relocation of some traders. In 1986, construction of a mosque and adjacent buildings caused further displacement.

By the beginning of the 1990s, the expansion of trading areas had become sufficiently extensive that the car park in front of the main hall was converted into additional selling space.

=== Regional commercial importance ===
Dantokpa serves traders from several West and Central African countries. Merchants from Nigeria, Niger, Burkina Faso, Mali, Ivory Coast and Cameroon conduct business there.

In 2012, daily attendance was reported to exceed one million buyers.

Trade with Nigeria occupies an important place in the market's activity. Nigerian traders travel to Dantokpa to purchase goods, while the Nigerian naira is exchanged through informal currency trading.

The market functions as both a wholesale and retail centre. A significant proportion of consumer goods entering Cotonou passes through Dantokpa before being redistributed to smaller markets and neighbourhood retailers.

=== Products and services ===
Goods being unloaded for Dantokpa Market

Dantokpa has played an important role in import and re-export trade between Benin and neighbouring countries, particularly Nigeria. Earlier trade included luxury goods, while the market later developed a broader range of everyday consumer products.

Economic changes in Nigeria have influenced the range and value of goods sold at Dantokpa.

Food products sold at the market include rice, maize, gari, sugar, vegetables, meat and processed foods. Other goods include footwear, jewellery, cosmetics, beverages, handicrafts, household goods and manufactured products.

Textiles form an important part of the market's activity. Women traders play a major role in the sale of printed fabrics, including African wax prints, as well as cosmetics, agricultural products and other consumer goods.

== Organisation and operation ==
Dantokpa has historically been managed by the Société de gestion des marchés autonomes (SOGEMA), a state-owned commercial body under the supervision of the Beninese ministry responsible for decentralisation.

The organisation has been responsible for allocating trading spaces, collecting rents and market fees, regulating circulation and maintaining market infrastructure.

Daily market fees are collected from traders occupying formal and informal selling spaces.

At the beginning of the 1990s, traders protested against SOGEMA's management practices. An association representing users of Cotonou's autonomous markets organised a payment strike. Following the dispute, members of the management team and fee collectors were replaced, some market charges were reduced and traders gained representation on a joint management committee.

Before 1991, itinerant traders paid a road-use fee of 100 CFA francs. The amount was subsequently reduced and restrictions on their circulation were relaxed.

The market also attracts occasional traders, including unemployed young people and salaried workers seeking supplementary income.

Plans connected with the development of the Akassato wholesale market have included the transfer of wholesale activities away from central Cotonou while Dantokpa retains a greater focus on retail trade.

== Safety and sanitation ==
=== Recurring fires ===
Dantokpa Market has experienced several fires affecting shops, stalls and stored merchandise.

=== Sanitation management ===
The density of commercial activities and the extension of stalls into surrounding areas have created persistent waste-management and sanitation problems.

Waste, packaging and wastewater accumulate around drainage channels and along parts of the lagoon.

The number of sanitation facilities has been described as insufficient for the large number of traders and visitors. Open drains are also used as dumping areas, while stalls positioned beside drainage channels complicate cleaning operations.

Historically, market maintenance teams were responsible for cleaning public toilets and removing refuse, although the size and density of the market made comprehensive maintenance difficult.

Dantokpa Market

Traffic inside the market

Pedestrian overpass

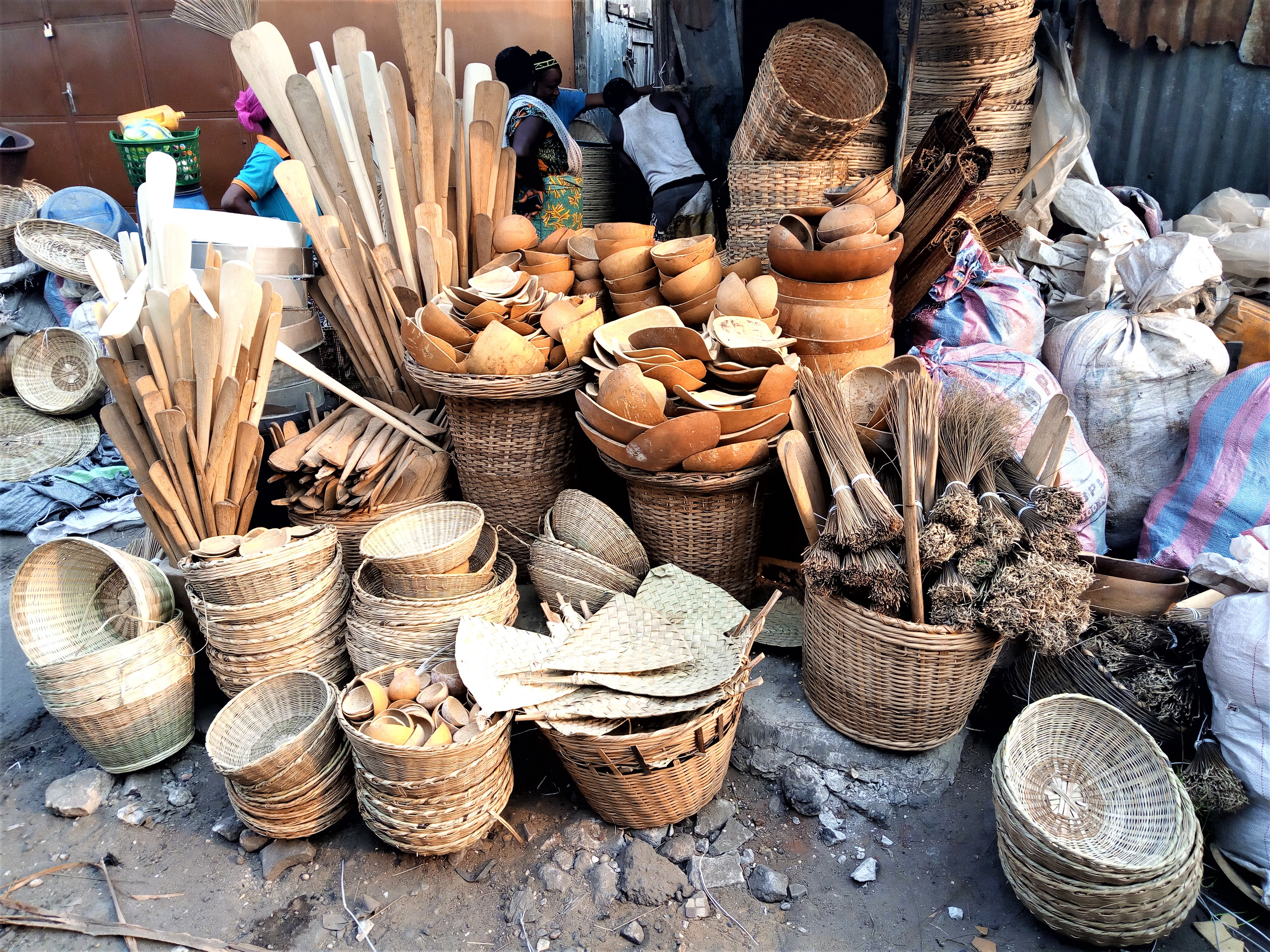
Traditional baskets and wooden utensils

Sign of the Dantokpa special police station

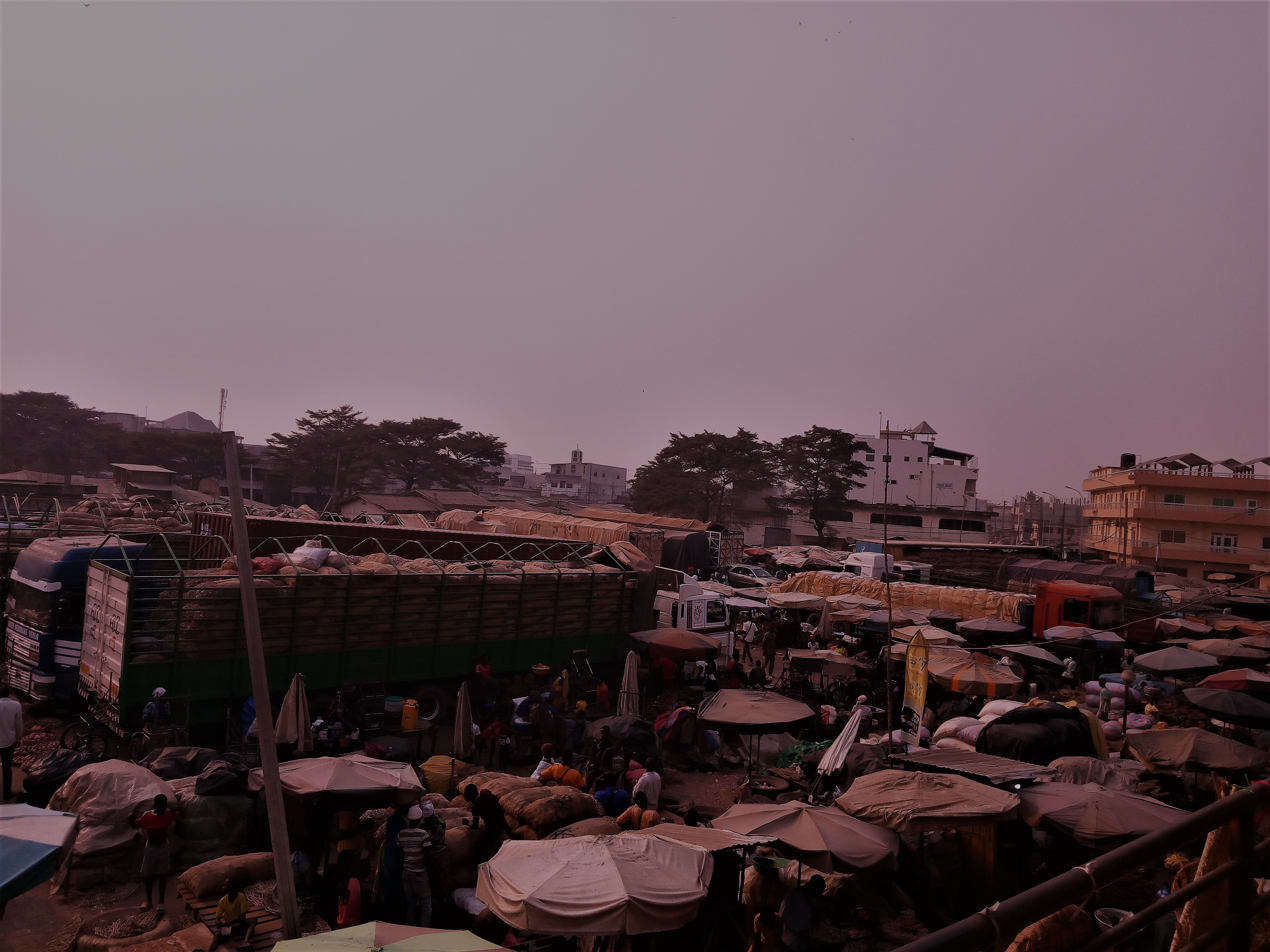
Panoramic view of the market

A seller of klui-klui at Dantokpa Market

== In popular culture ==
Dantokpa Market appears in the first episode of the 2021 Netflix documentary series High on the Hog: How African American Cuisine Transformed America. Presenter Stephen Satterfield visits the market with food historian Jessica B. Harris while examining the African origins of foods and culinary traditions associated with African-American cuisine.

== See also ==
=== Related articles ===
- Economy of Benin
- Markets in Benin

=== Further reading ===
- Donnenfeld, J. (1970). Étude d'un marché urbain africain: Dantokpa (in French). École des Lettres et Sciences Humaines. p. 87.
- Prag, Ebbe (2010). "Women leaders and the sense of power: clientelism and citizenship at the Dantokpa market in Cotonou, Benin". In Lindell, Ilda (ed.). Africa's Informal Workers: Collective Agency, Alliances and Transnational Organizing in Urban Africa. London and New York: Zed Books. ISBN 978-1-8481-3452-2.
- Malam Moussa, Tidjani A.; Soulé, Bio Goura; Afouda, Alix Servais (2010). "Les marchés urbains de Cotonou". Échanges et réseaux marchands en Afrique. Maîtrise de l'espace et développement (in French). Vol. 7. Karthala. ISBN 978-2-8111-0371-2. OCLC 705879342.
- Paulais, Thierry; Wilhelm, Laurence (2000). Marchés d'Afrique (in French). Karthala. ISBN 978-2-84586-059-9.
- Paulais, Thierry (1998). "Le marché dans la ville d'Afrique noire : Équipements publics et économie locale". Les Annales de la Recherche Urbaine (in French). 80 (1): 35–41. doi:10.3406/aru.1998.2195.
