= Confectionery store =

Shop selling sweet foods

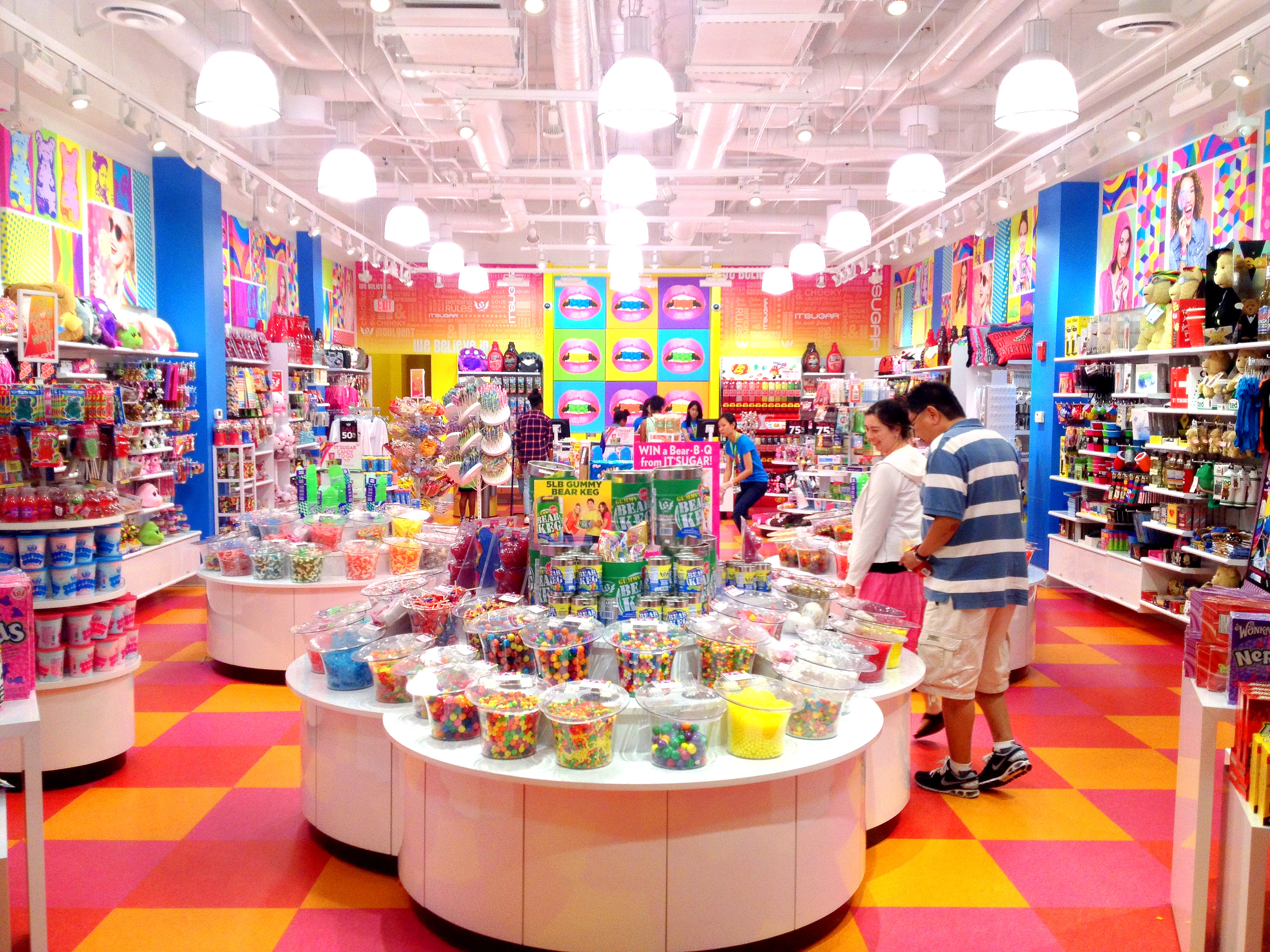
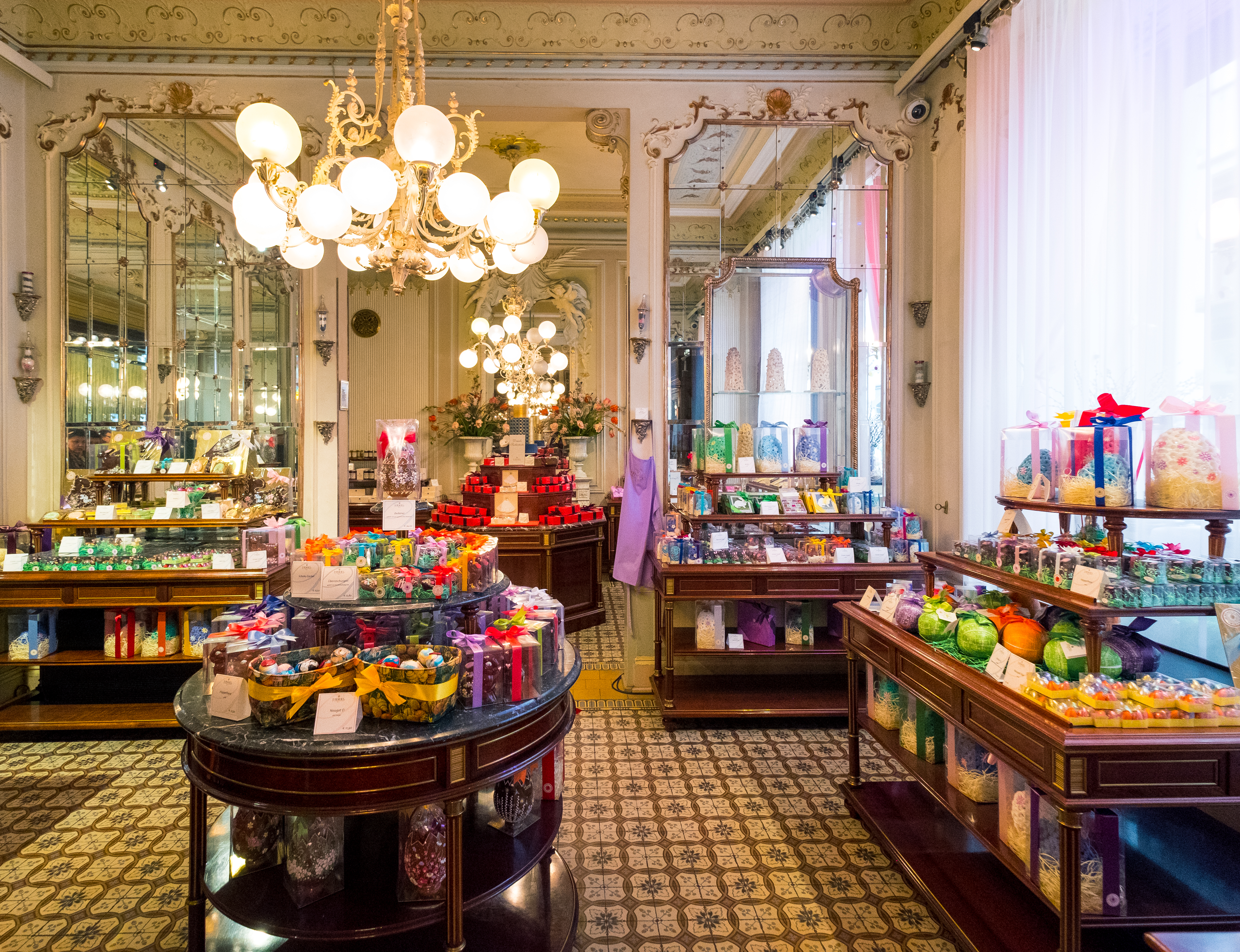
An American candy store and an Austrian Konditorei (top), a Welsh pick-and-mix sweet shop (middle), a Turkish confectionery store and a Moroccan sweets stall (bottom)

A confectionery store (also known as a sweet shop, candy store, or lolly shop) is a speciality business that sells confections, usually focusing on sugar confectionery. They sell candy, candied fruit and nuts, chocolates, locally manufactured sweets, international delicacies, and "vintage" and "classic" varieties such as rock candy, chewing gum and liquorice. Confectionery stores have traded for over 1,000 years, selling and sometimes making confections on site. Dedicated confectionery stores are popular small businesses in many countries due to their low start-up costs, high markup potential, and diverse appeal.

Confectionery stores have existed since at least the post-classical period, with roots in such diverse places as Song China, Ayyubid Egypt, and Heian Japan. The establishment of colonial plantations in the 18th century dramatically lowered the price of sugar, leading to a proliferation of confectionery stores in Europe. The development of mass production in the 19th century enabled the creation of specialist machinery, which lowered prices still further; this made items like candies able to be sold and produced in quantity, and more available and affordable to most economic classes. The modern era has seen the development of bulk confectionery and worldwide specialisations differentiating the confectionery trade across countries.

== History ==
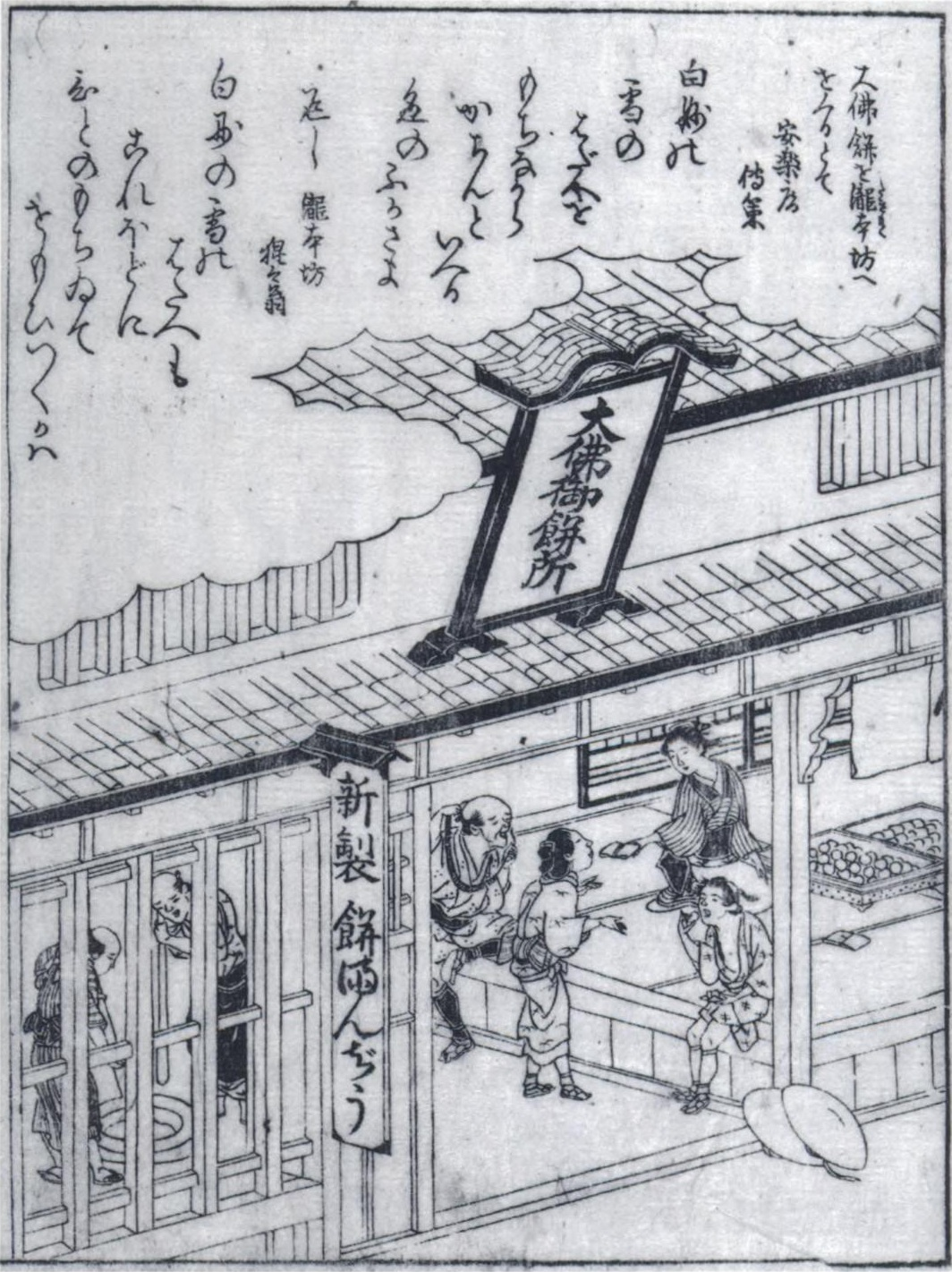
"The Great Buddha Sweet Shop" from Ritō Akizato's Miyako meisho zue (1787)

=== Early history ===
Stores and stalls have sold confections for well over a thousand years. Sugar and sweets were readily available in various Chinese cities during the Song dynasty (960–1279). Shops in Kaifeng sold children's treats like candied fruits, shrimp whiskers (pulled sugar) and thick sweets. In Hangzhou, vendors sold sugar and honey cakes, shaped candies, spun sugar, sweet pastes and syrup.

In Kyoto, Japan, the confectionery shop Ichimonjiya Wasuke, also known as Ichiwa, is traditionally dated to around 1000 CE and continues to sell mochi to shrine visitors. Located near Imamiya Shrine, its speciality is aburi-mochi (あぶり餅), which are grilled rice cakes coated in sweet miso sauce.

In the mid-ninth to early-tenth century in Persia, the almond-sugar confection marzipan is said to have been prescribed by the physician Rhazes as a remedy for illness. By the 13th century, marzipan was often sold and traded with foreigners. Within a century, it was consumed by nobility as an early form of confectionery; not long after, it began to be fashioned in intricate, fanciful shapes and served at royal courts. Marzipan is sold in many confectionery stores to this day, especially during the traditional winter holiday seasons. During the Safavid era from the 16th to 18th century, confectionery markets sold sweets to accompany coffee in Isfahan.

In Egypt, increasingly large-scale sugar production and trade, which began in the 12th century by the Ayyubid dynasty, developed through the 13th to 16th centuries during the Mamluk Sultanate. Confectioners in Cairo sold a variety of sweets, many with nuts or seeds but not usually fruits. Sugar figurines filled the markets during the month of Rajab and were widely purchased as gifts.

Sephardic Jews fleeing the Spanish Inquisition in the 16th century brought their chocolate-making to France.

=== 16th–18th centuries ===
The Female Confectioner (1695) by Nicolas II de Larmessin, part of a satirical series about trades in Paris

Starting in the 16th century, wealthy Europeans' meals often ended with sweet dishes, giving rise to occupations dedicated to sweets, including gingerbread makers, sugar bakers and pie bakers. Apothecaries also processed herbs and fruits into preserved sweets for medicinal purposes. Modern confectionery stores developed from the convergence of these trades, as taste and attitudes towards sweets shifted through the 17th and 18th centuries. Once seen as primarily medicinal, sweets were increasingly understood and sold as a luxurious treat.

As colonial sugar production increased, sugar prices declined during the 18th century, and confections became more accessible to the middle classes of Europe and the Americas. This allowed specialised confectionery stores to emerge, such as La Mère de Famille, which opened in Paris in 1761, and remains one of the city's oldest surviving confectionery shops. By 1800, the role of the modern confectioner or sweet maker emerged.

=== 19th century to present ===
In the 19th century, the development of specialised machinery, such as revolving steam pans and lozenge machines, enabled the mass production and accessibility of confections to poorer consumers. Chocolate production was revolutionised by the hydraulic press and techniques such as conching, and it became a common ingredient in confections. Sugary confections became more associated with commercial shops with their greater variety of flavours and textures, and less associated with the more limited offerings of the home kitchen. By the late 1800s, sugar prices had fallen further, easing production costs.

In the late 19th century, shops began offering bulk confectionery, typically individually-wrapped and sold in large self-serve containers; in the United States, this was often referred to as "penny candy", while in the United Kingdom it was known as "pick and mix".

In the 20th century, confectionery stores started to expand worldwide as development and production improved, with new products.

==== Tourism ====
A selection of Blackpool rock in different flavours

While children are the primary consumers of sugar candy, nostalgia may bring adult customers to confectionery shops. Large confectionery stores opened in the 21st century, including Candylicious in 2009 at the Dubai Mall, which has an area of 10,000 ft^{2} (930 m^{2}). Opened in 2011, the M&M's World shop in London is the world's largest confectionery shop at around 35,000 ft^{2} (3,300 m^{2}). Brussels Airport has the highest chocolate sales in the world, with travellers purchasing an average of 500 g (18 oz) of chocolate every 15 seconds, or 650 tonnes a year. Attractions such as Cadbury World, in Birmingham, UK, and Hershey's Chocolate World in Pennsylvania, United States, offer factory tours and tastings.

== Around the world ==
=== Local specialities ===
Confectionery stores often stock regional confections such as Mexican cochinito de piloncillo, British Blackpool rock, or Southeast Asian dodol, as well as regional variations of confections like fudge, gumdrops or hard candies. Some stores (chocolateries) only sell varieties of chocolate and similar products. Others focus on novelty candies (such as promotionally-oriented snacks or unusual flavours).

Stores may target specific consumer demographics, such as teenagers, wealthy consumers or tourists. They may have specialities like allergy-free selections, sugarless candies, or vegan products.

=== Asia ===
==== China ====
White Rabbit candies for sale at a confectionery store

In China, wedding candy (Chinese: 喜糖; pinyin: xǐtáng; lit. 'happy candy') stores grew popular in the 1990s. Zigu Road in Jiangxi had over 20 wedding candy shops, including shops like White Rabbit Creamy Candies, a company based in Shanghai. White Rabbit candies gained popularity throughout the country for their soft, chewy texture and sweet taste. As a result, Chinese confectioneries still use the signature name "Shanghai Candies" to this day. Southern provinces such as Jiangsu, Zhejiang, Fujian and Anhui accounted for nearly 80% of the national wedding confectionery store share, according to food critic Zhu Danpeng. It was a thriving new market that business owners competed in, to the point that they crammed shops with candy and displayed sweets outside the doors and into the streets for consumers. Declining sales amid factors such as the COVID-19 pandemic, falling marriage rates, and increased demand for healthier fruit- and nut-based snacks have driven Chinese confectionery stores to target a wealthier consumer base with imported chocolates and biscuits.

A sugar painter's stall in Hainan Province

Sugar painting is an art form practised by street vendors in Sichuan and the surrounding area. The customer, usually a child, will first spin a wheel to see what form the seller will make. The seller will take liquid sugar on a spoon and drizzle it in a single line onto a slab of marble to make shapes such as birds, fish, dogs, dragons, or even solid forms like bicycles or flower baskets. If it is a flat piece, it will be put on a stick, or wrapped in plastic and given to the customer. This has to be done very quickly, or the sugar will become too hard to work. Sugar painting requires a very significant level of expertise.

==== India ====
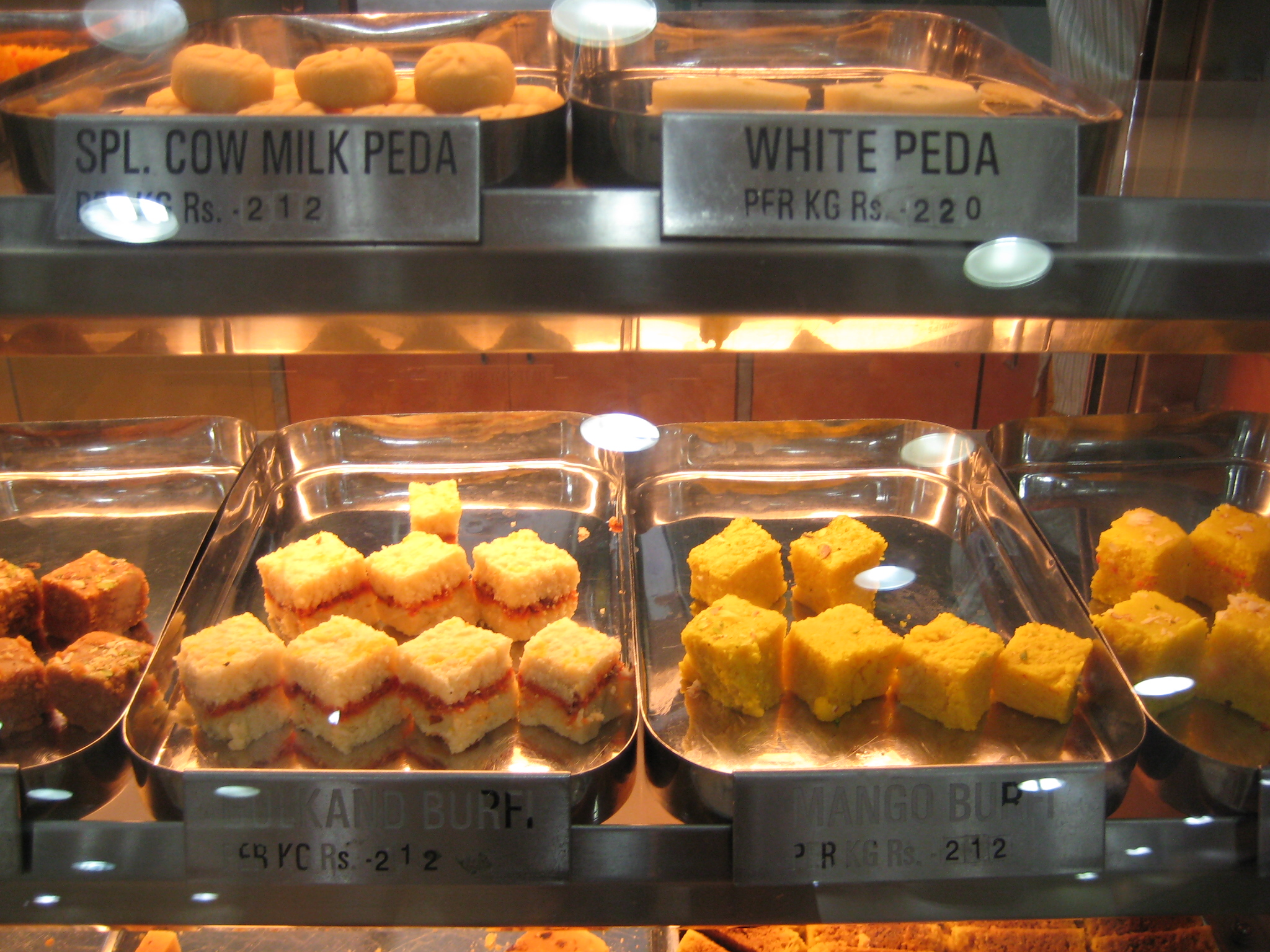
A mix of barfi and peda, two types of traditional sweets, in Chennai, India

In India, confectioners are known as halwai, and shops selling traditional sweets are commonly known as mithai shops. In Hindi, mithai ki dukan (मिठाई की दुकान) means "sweet shop". The majority of Indian sweets are milk-based, such as barfi. Their offerings vary by region; Agra is known for petha, a sweet made from ash gourd, while Mathura is known for peda. Kolkata has a long-established tradition of sweet shops selling Bengali sweets such as sandesh, as well as seasonal preparations such as pithe. Sales peak during Diwali, with many shops selling mithai boxes for Diwali celebrations.

One of the oldest sweets shops in India is Bhagat Halwai in Agra, which was created in 1795. Ghantewala is one of the oldest in Old Delhi, having been founded in 1790, and has served multiple generations of Indian political leaders; it was shut down in 2015 due to declining sales and legal issues, but reopened in August 2024. The oldest store selling sweets in Kolkata is likely Adi Haridas Modak (1780).

==== Iran ====
Tehran cafés gradually added sweets and became café confectioneries. These businesses sold Iranian pastries such as baklava, qottab, Yazdi cakes, and walnut breads. As Danish pastries and cream cakes became popular, their offerings shifted toward European-style baked goods; Tehran shops include Bahār, reportedly opened in 1317 SH (1938–39), and later businesses such as Lādan, Hans, Lord, Mignon, Natalie, and France and Iran va Hind. Isfahan’s confectionery trade is best known for Poolaki, rock candy, Gosh-e fil, gaz, a soft nougat-like sweet traditionally made with sugar or syrup and egg whites, often containing pistachios or almonds. Shops sell it in different forms, including bite-sized pieces (gaz-e loghmeh) and flour-dusted pieces (gaz-e ardi). Other characteristic products include polaki (thin, brittle sugar candy), sohan (a rich brittle sweet), and nan-e karki, a local cookie. Some confectioners also offer modern cakes, chocolates, and assorted pastries. Tulumba and Jalebi have been subsidised in the country during Ramadan since the 1979 revolution, and they are only allowed to sell in stores at night to observe Islamic Republic regime restrictions, as with all food stores.

==== Japan ====
In the Edo period, confectionery stores bore the symbol of paulownia and swirling patterns, and often had an image of Kawaguchiya, one of the two main candy brands in the An'ei era. Small-scale shops had umbrellas to protect candies from melting or getting wet. To increase sales, some vendors wore women's clothing or displayed karakuri puppets. A vendor sang along with a shamisen and was rewarded with clothing bearing the Onoe Kikugorō V family's crest.

In a 1777 listing, there were 28 confectionery stores in Edo (now Tokyo). Several of them called themselves "kudarikyogashiya" to benefit from an association with "kudarimono", prized goods from the region of Kamigata. Kyoto meibutsu mizu no fukiyose had confectionery reviews, judging their specialities, product colour, degree of steaming for steamed confectionery and even the confectionery's container.

Cafés began to appear in the Meiji era, serving Western sweets and coffee; they developed further during the Taishō era.

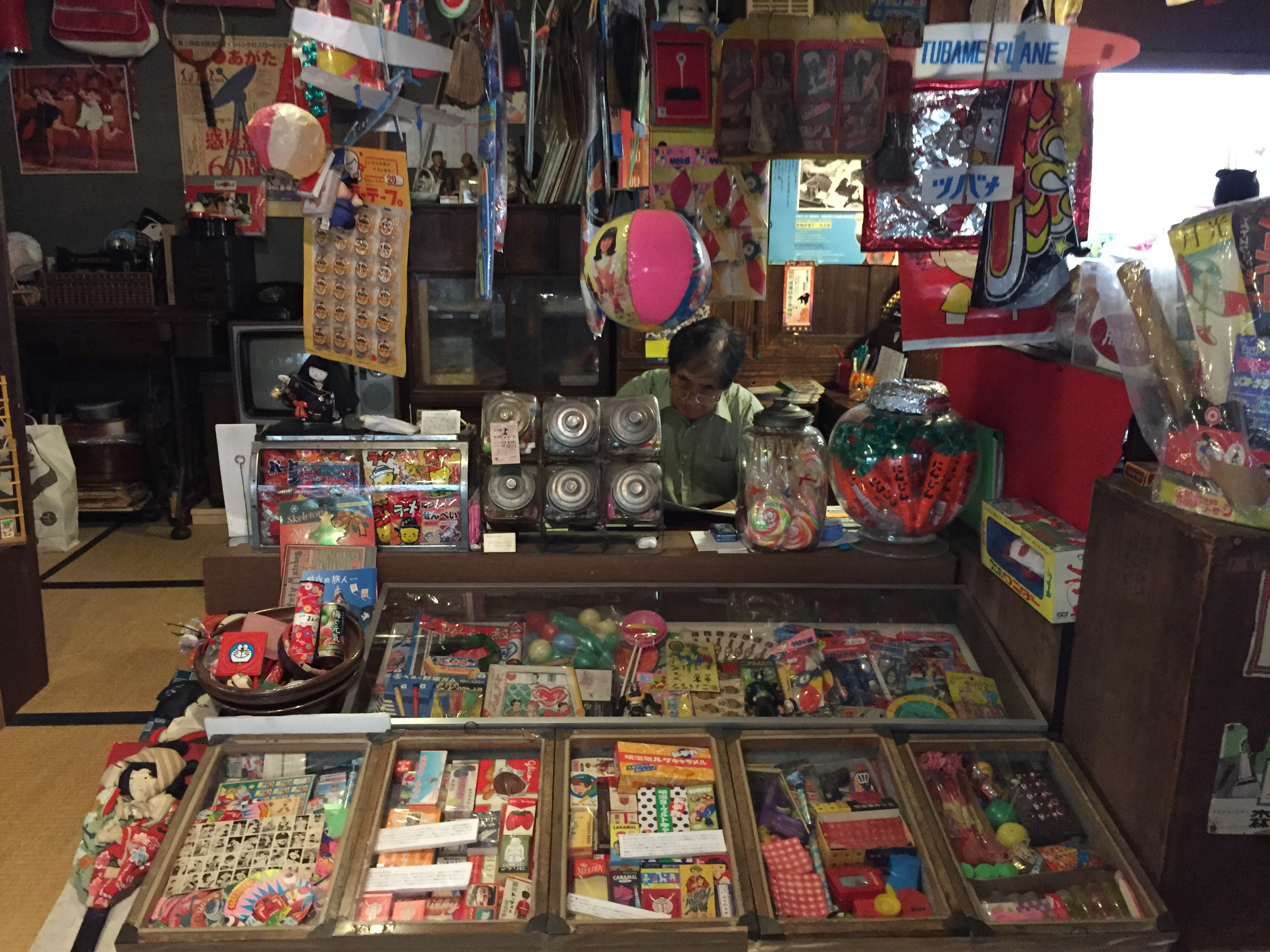
Recreation of a dagashiya at Ōme Akasuka Fujio Kaikan Museum (Retro Museum of Packaging from the Showa Era, 1926–1989)

Prior to the 1980s, the Japanese custom of purchasing candy took place at a dagashiya (駄菓子屋), also known as a "trivial sweets shop". When konbini stores began to take root in the late 1980s, the smaller, less-stocked dagashiya market began to face steady competition. Despite this competition, a number of dagashiya chains managed to survive. One notable example is Okashi no Machioka, known for selling both Western items such as potato chips and chocolate bars, alongside traditional snacks such as yōkan (羊羹) and umaibō (うまい棒). Some dagashiya stores have been in the same location for centuries. One example is Kami-kawaguchiya, which was established in Zōshigaya and, as of 2026, remained open for over 200 years.

Notable candies sold at Japanese confectioneries include plum-flavoured snacks, jellies, jams, mints, nuts and crackers. Senbei (煎餅), a type of rice cracker, can also be regularly spotted in shops like these. Seafood is also a very common offering in these shops; iwashi (dried sardines) and ika (dried squid) are very popular snacks.

==== Korea ====
During the Joseon dynasty, honey and yeot were used to sweeten food, while sugar imported in small quantities from China was used primarily as a medicinal ingredient for the royal court and upper classes. In the 1890s, stores in Jongno District began selling candies made from imported sugar. Before then, vendors sold yeot in market stalls and on the street, continuing until at least the 1920s.

The "Sweet Park" of Shinsegae Department Store’s Gangnam branch, opened in 2024, is a popular "K-dessert" location.

==== Malaysia ====
During the early 20th century, traditional coffee shops known as kopitiam became established in British Malaya. Many were operated by Hainanese Chinese immigrants and served coffee alongside local foods and baked goods. Dedicated confectionery businesses subsequently developed, including King's Confectionery, which grew from a family bakery established in the 1960s, and Chiap Tong, a biscuit and candy shop founded in Kuala Lumpur in 1942.

==== Turkey ====
Confectioneries in Konya from the 13th century are mentioned in the writings of Sufi poet Mevlânâ. Sweets were sold in shops and street stands and occasionally advertised and sold on floats in street processions, as depicted in 16th-century Ottoman miniatures. Parrots were sometimes associated with sweets through verses of mystic poetry in which they desired sweets and would become eloquent, or "sweet-tongued", after consuming sugar.

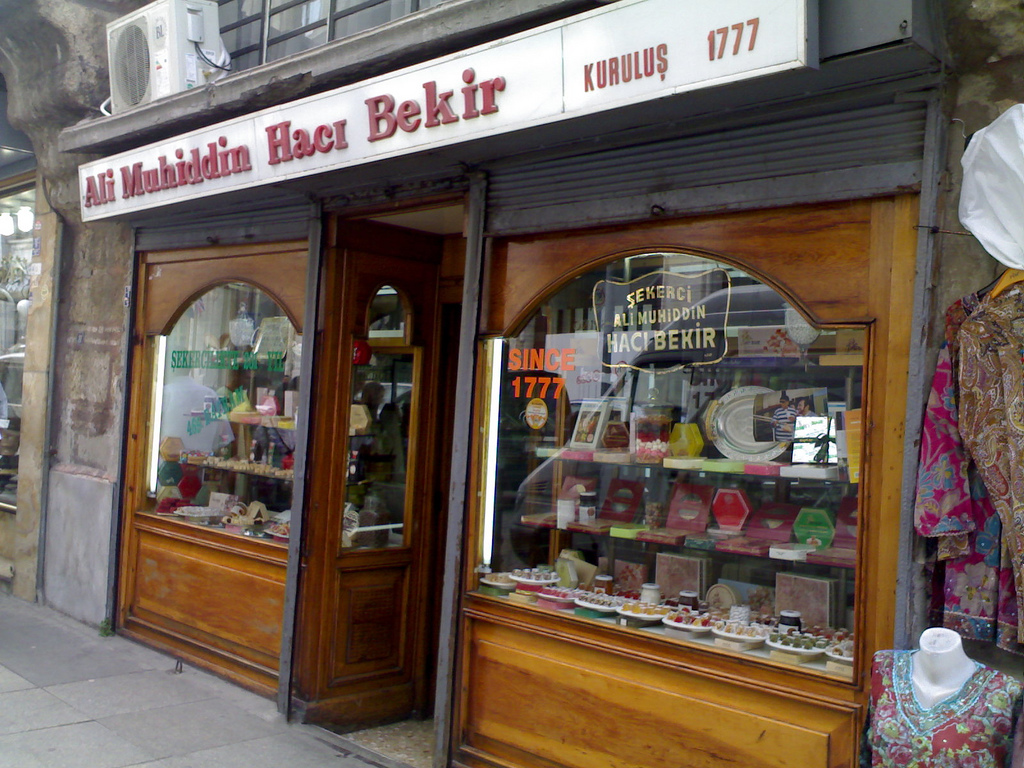
The Hacı Bekir shop in Istanbul

Turkey, and especially its Historical Peninsula, is home to several confectioneries. These stores have been operating since the 18th and 19th centuries. Some of the oldest surviving confectioneries from this era are Şekerci Cafer Erol, Ali Muhittin Hacı Bekir and Hicipoğlu Şekerleme, which reportedly is the oldest confectionery in Istanbul and has been in operation since 1752.

The Hacı Bekir shop in Istanbul, which opened in 1777, claims to have created the modern Turkish delight (lokum). The shop is one of the 100 oldest companies in the world.

=== Europe ===
==== France ====
One of France's oldest confiseries, À la Mère de Famille, was founded by Pierre-Jean Bernard and opened in 1761. Candy had been consumed in the country since the Middle Ages, when Regnaut-Barbon founded a guild of confectioners, only eaten by the aristocracy and royalty, as well as being used in religious ceremonies.

==== Germany ====
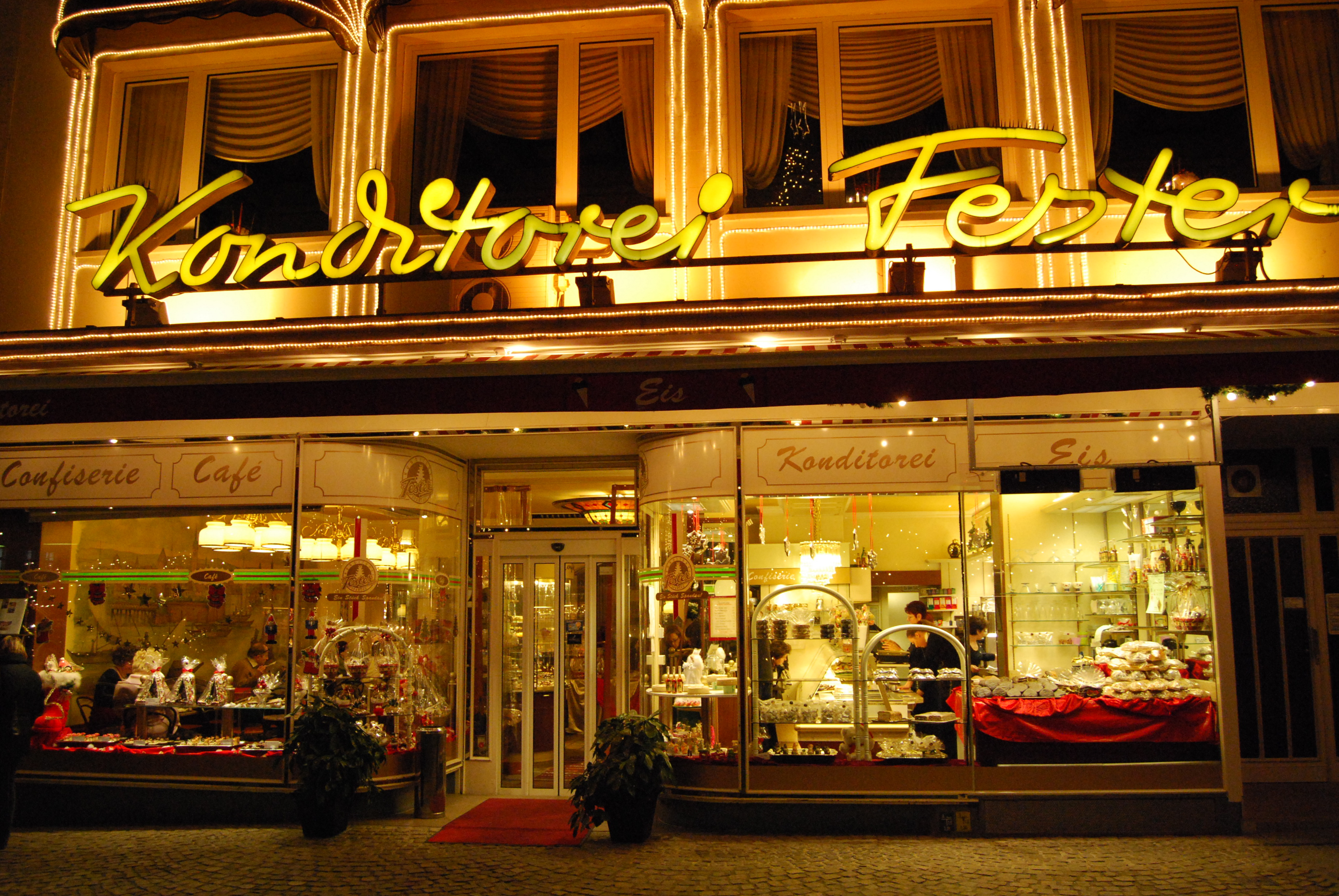
Traditional Konditorei Fester, est. 1926 in Spandau, Berlin, Germany

In Germany, the traditional high-end pastry shop and café is known as a Konditorei. Unlike a standard retail sweet shop or bakery (Bäckerei), a Konditorei specialises in fine baked goods, elaborate tortes, pastries and artisanal chocolates, frequently operating alongside an integrated sit-down café. Master pastry chefs (Konditormeister) undergo rigorous, regulated vocational training, maintaining a distinction between scratch-made artisanal confections and mass-produced commercial snacks.

The trade's roots stretch deep into the mediaeval European guild system. In Nuremberg, a prominent trading nexus, some of Germany's earliest specialised corporate guilds for fine pastry and spice bakers were established. These included historic Lebküchner (gingerbread) guilds documented as early as the 17th century. Over subsequent centuries, these traditions expanded through court pastry chefs (Hofkonditoren) and the opening of early German coffee houses. Over time, the Konditorei matured into a widespread public institution closely tied to the German tradition of Kaffee und Kuchen (coffee and cake), and gradually its offerings expanded to include sugar confectionery such as liquorice, candy canes, marzipan, pralines and gummy candies, leading to the alternative designation "sugar bakery" (Zuckerbäckerei).

While dedicated standalone candy shops are relatively rare in modern Germany compared to the Anglo-American world, everyday sweet retail historically operated through general-goods corner stores known as Tante-Emma-Laden ("Aunt Emma stores"). These small neighbourhood shops typically featured glass jars of loose sweets sold individually or compiled into a customised pick-and-mix paper bag, traditionally called a bunte Tüte (lit. "colorful bag"). Following the decline of general store chains in the late 20th century, this informal sweet-shop role was largely absorbed by street-side kiosks (Kiosk or Büdchen) and supermarket chains.

==== Netherlands ====
A modern Jamin store in the Netherlands

Dedicated sweet shops in the Netherlands began to emerge in the 19th century alongside the industrialisation of sugar production. Prior to this period, sugar confections were predominantly crafted by apothecaries, who prepared sweets as medicinal remedies, or by specialised sugar bakers (suikerbakkers) catering exclusively to the wealthy elite. Large-scale beet sugar production began in the Netherlands in 1858, and sugar prices fell sharply from about 1873 as world production rose, making sweets widely affordable to the general public and leading to the establishment of the first industrial candy factories and dedicated confectionery retailers across the country.

In 1842, Willem Hendrik Fortuin founded Fortuin in Lemmer as a pastry and sugar bakery; the business soon moved to Dokkum and became known nationally for its peppermints, receiving a royal warrant in 1896. Later, in 1867, Winkeltje Kouwenhoven was established in Delft as a general provisions store, quickly gaining renown for specialising in traditional Dutch sweets and dry goods. In 1878, Gerrit van Voornveld began producing liquorice (drop) and peppermints in a steam factory in Amsterdam; the firm, originally named after its founder, was renamed Venco (short for "Voornveld en Co.") in 1904. This manufacturing trend continued into the 20th century with the establishment of Red Band in Roosendaal by Teunis Overwater in 1928. The liquorice and sugar confectionery factory expanded in 1935, opened a branch in Turnhout, Belgium, in 1938, and later employed about 350 people.

The defining retail model for Dutch confectionery stores was established by Cornelis Jamin. Jamin began trading sweets as a street vendor in Rotterdam in 1870, before establishing two small sugar processing facilities in 1880 and opening his first official retail confectionery shop in 1883. In 1888, Jamin scaled up production significantly by opening the Zuid-Hollandsche Stoomfabriek van Koek, Banket, Chocolade en Suikerwerken in the Rotterdam district of Crooswijk. His retail chain experienced rapid expansion, growing from 50 stores in 1907 to around 300 locations by the 1930s, eventually reaching a peak of over 600 stores nationwide operating under a unified retail format during the 1950s and 1960s.

==== Russia ====
Russian confectionery shops have served as both manufacturing facilities and stores. The growth of such places took place in the 19th century after the establishment of large chocolate manufacturing enterprises by entrepreneurs from Europe and within the country, such as Einem (then the nationalised Red October sweet factory), Abrikosov (then Babaevsky), and Lenov (then Rot Front brand). After their nationalisation during the Soviet period, these retail stores became the main distribution channels of confectionery produced by state enterprises.

==== Sweden ====
Sweden has a unique culture surrounding the consumption of candy, with the majority of it being purchased on Saturdays due to the tradition of lördagsgodis emerging in the 1950s as a response to dental issues facing the population. Relegating candy consumption to one day a week was a solution to the rise of tooth decay. Swedish candy is typically pick-and-mix style, sold at dedicated confectionery stores and grocery stores. Candies sold at Swedish stores include many forms of liquorice, gummies, and sour candies. Liquorice specifically is largely associated with Sweden and other Scandinavian countries. Swedish candy stores are beginning to pop up in other parts of the world, such as the United States. According to The Boston Globe, Swedish candies became a trend due to viral TikTok videos starting in 2023.

==== Switzerland ====
Switzerland is home to many confectionery chains, and luxury chocolate has become associated with the country. These stores are owned by manufacturers such as Lindt and Confiserie Sprüngli. Chocolate was introduced to Europe following Spanish contact with the Americas by the colonisation of South America in the sixteenth century, and Switzerland developed its own chocolate-making industry that expanded during the nineteenth century through innovations in manufacturing and the development of milk chocolate. Beginning in the 18th century, cafes became fashionable places to purchase and consume chocolate and confectionery. Confectionery stores began gaining traction in the 19th century with the invention of milk chocolate and dark chocolate (through the process of conching) by Daniel Peter in 1875 and Rodolphe Lindt in 1879, respectively. One such Swiss confectionery store is the Confiserie Sprüngli branch in Zurich, notable for its chocolate and other confectionery such as the Luxemburgerli, a type of macaron.

==== United Kingdom ====
A counter at a traditional sweet shop in Harrogate, North Yorkshire (2026)

Sugared sweets became popular in the Tudor period, with comfits made from sugared spices, seeds and nuts. These were connected to apothecaries, who would offer sweets to disguise the taste of medicines.

Dedicated sweet shops originated during the 19th century, which featured lavish architecture and catered to wealthy clientele. The Oldest Sweet Shop in Pateley Bridge, England, opened in 1827 and claims to be the longest continuously open seller of aniseed balls, liquorice and sherbet flying saucers in the world, as well as the oldest sweet shop in England. The oldest continuously operating sweet shop in Scotland is the Star Rock Shop, which opened in Kirriemuir in 1833. The gradual reduction and eventual abolition of sugar duties in the UK during the 19th century contributed to an increase in the number of sweet shops in Britain.

In the early 19th century, sweets were produced locally for individual shops with few quality controls, and were often adulterated using cheap substances in order to bring down the price. The 1858 Bradford sweets poisoning, in which 20 people died after a sweetmaker accidentally adulterated sweets with arsenic instead of gypsum, led to the introduction of the Adulteration of Food or Drink Act 1860.

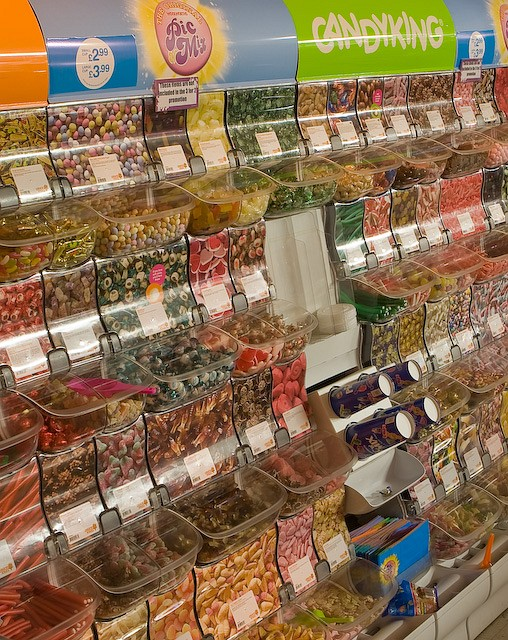
Pic'n'Mix at a Woolworths store in Eastleigh, Hampshire (2008)

Woolworths dominated confectionery retailing in the UK, starting in 1909 by selling loose sweets by weight, which were known as Pic'n'Mix. Sweets were initially sourced from New York, but UK factories such as Barker and Dobson and Cadbury's soon became the main suppliers. This was part of a trend away from dedicated sweet shops towards confectionery sections in general stores such as Woolworths and later in the aisles of supermarkets, as shopping habits changed throughout the 20th century.

More recently, due to nostalgia, tourist appeal and the ability to advertise through social media, the dedicated sweet shop has made something of a comeback. Some newer American-themed confectionery stores in the United Kingdom have been investigated by authorities over suspected tax evasion, money laundering, counterfeit goods, and other regulatory violations.

=== North America ===
==== Canada ====
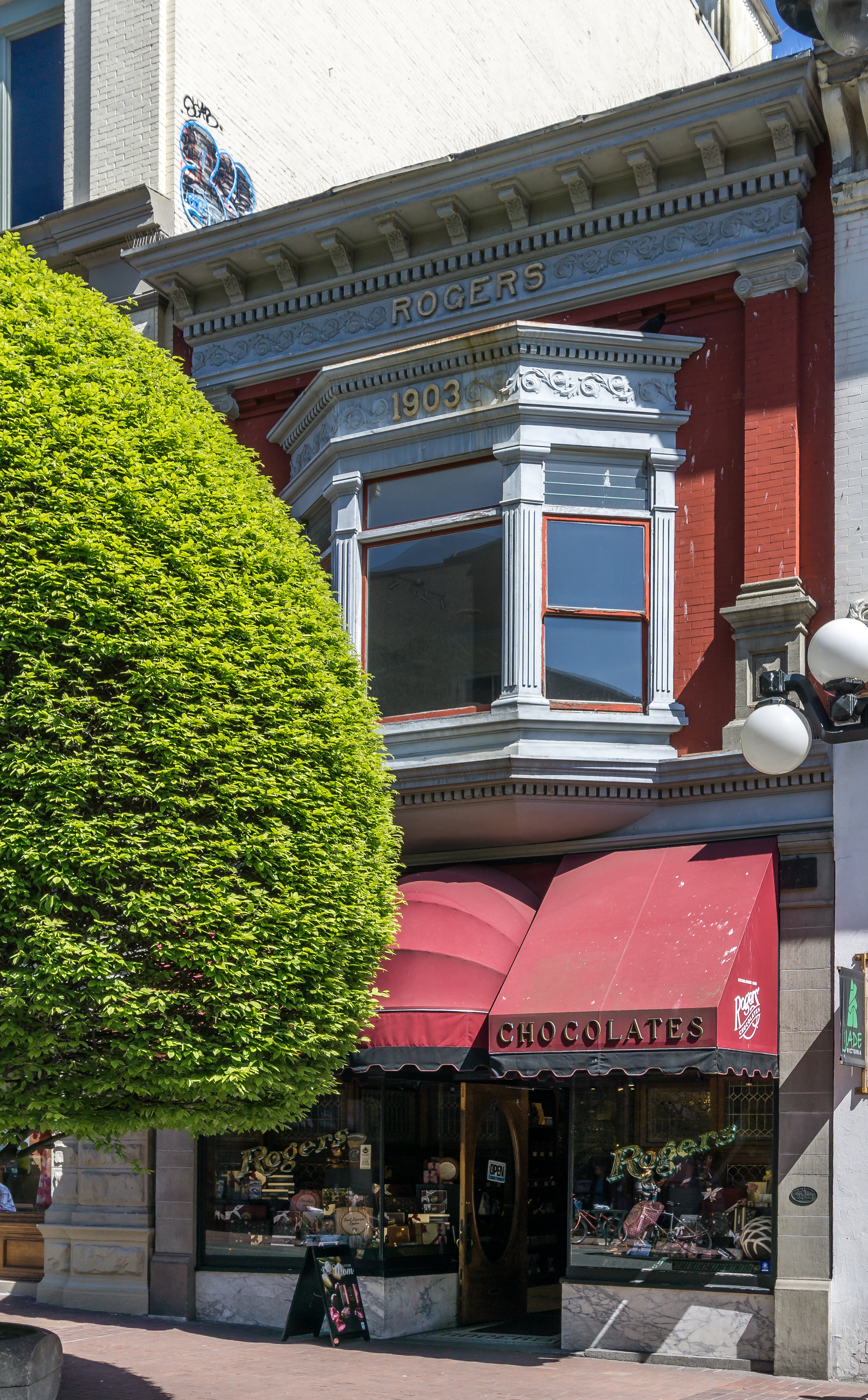
The historic Rogers Chocolates in Victoria, BC

In 1885, Charles W. Rogers founded a shop in Victoria, British Columbia, initially selling staples along with confections. The shop quickly became so popular that it had to ration its boxes of chocolates to one per customer. By 1917, it had moved to a larger brick building (the Rogers Building), where it operates to this day. Frank O'Connor founded the first Laura Secord Candy Store in 1913. By 1924, his business was described by The Financial Post as the world's largest chain of candy shops, with 46 Laura Secord stores.

==== Mexico ====
In Mexico, candy shops are known as dulcerías. One such establishment, Dulcería de Celaya, has been in continuous operation in Mexico City since 1874, making it one of the oldest businesses in the city's historic centre. Chucherías, or candy stands, are also prevalent in Mexican markets.

==== United States ====
In the colonial period and early 19th century, American sweets included sugarplums, maple-syrup candy in the North, benne (sesame) confections in the South, and hard lemon and peppermint candies; marzipan was sold in New Amsterdam.

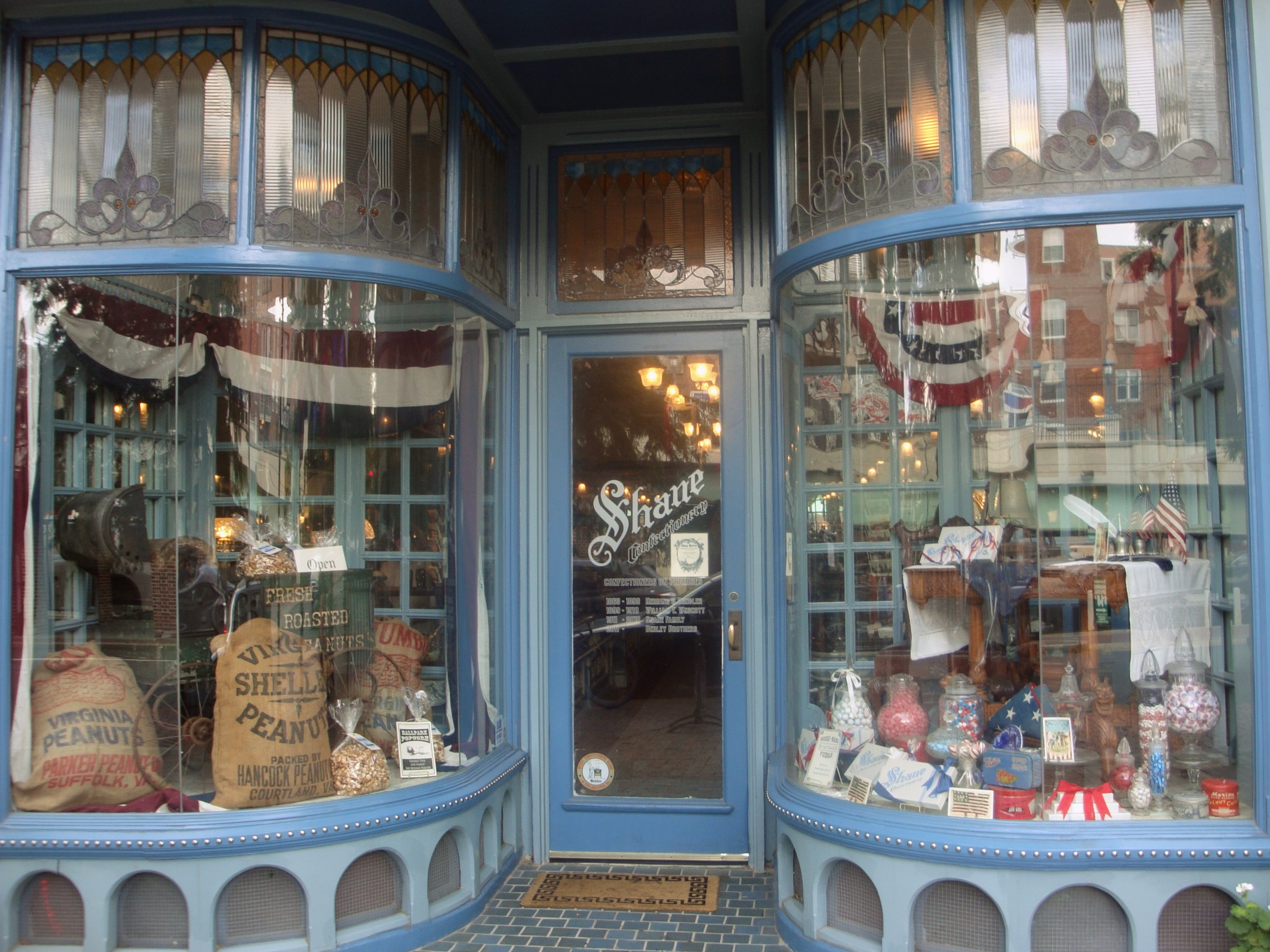
The Shane Confectionery in Philadelphia

Philadelphia, Pennsylvania, was home to the Caribbean sugar trade in the late 18th century. Thousands of French-speaking refugees moved there beginning in 1790, fleeing revolutions in France and Haiti, some establishing confectioneries. In 1816, there were over 20 confectioners in Philadelphia, which rose to about 200 in 1857. About half specialised in what is now called candy and the other half in different treats, including pastries, ice cream and jellies. "Ye Olde Pepper Candy Companie" in Salem, Massachusetts, the oldest candy shop in the United States, was founded in 1806 by Mary Spencer.

The Industrial Revolution in the mid-19th century allowed for sugar-based candies to be mass-produced. This made sweet treats affordable to more people. Also around this time, chocolate, which had previously generally been consumed unsweetened in the United States, became popular as a candy. By the middle of the century, more than 380 American factories produced "penny candy" (bulk confectionery) which was sold loose from boxes and glass containers. Candy became available in pharmacies and general stores. In more urban locations, roadside candy stores appeared, where candy was prepared in a back kitchen and sold in a small front room.

In the late 19th century, confectionery stores specialising exclusively in saltwater taffy started to become popular, primarily in New Jersey and northeastern coastal areas. At the same time, fudge, created in northeast America in the last quarter of the 1800s, also began to be sold in speciality confectionery stores in the same area. Saltwater taffy and fudge shops retain their identities as specialised shops and remain popular to this day, where goods made on-site (often where customers can view products being made) can be purchased as souvenirs or gifts. Steel's Fudge, established in New Jersey in 1919, claims to be the oldest existing family-owned business specialising in fudge in the United States. Crown Candy, a location in St. Louis, became relevant in 1913. They are known for creating their own chocolate.

In Buffalo, New York, many European-style confectionery stores were established by Greek immigrant families during the early 20th century. Some operated restaurants or soda fountains, which served ice cream in forms such as sundaes and milkshakes alongside their confectionery products.

In the southwestern United States, stores selling cactus candy were founded in the late 19th and early 20th centuries.

In the southern United States, in the early 19th century, the American version of pralines was being perfected, being modified from recipes originating in France, starting in places such as New Orleans, then spreading through the rest of the Southeast. These were sold in southern confectionery shops. After the Civil War, Black women known as pralinières made pralines at home and sold them from baskets on New Orleans streets. Pralines are especially prominent in Louisiana, where unique delicacies like praline-flavoured ice cream and praline-flavoured bacon are sold across the state. A distinctive praline made occasionally without milk or cream was also made in the state.

In the early 20th century, confectioners in the midwestern United States carried penny candy as well as regional specialities such as sauerkraut candy and other varieties of penuche fudges. These became prevalent starting around 1907 and derived from immigrant confectioners adapting their recipes to Midwestern tastes.

The United States Food and Drug Act of 1906 imposed stricter regulation on the manufacture and sale of food, helping confectionery stores build consumer trust and brand recognition. In 1917, Harrisburg, Pennsylvania had 55 confectionery shops for a population of 70,000.

Starting in the 1950s, American confectionery stores adopted highly colourful interiors in the "Googie" style, featuring geometric shapes, bright neon colours and high-contrast palettes to attract customers, primarily children.

The popularisation of the soda fountain in drug stores in the early twentieth century paved the way for factory-produced candy to be sold in drug store chains as well, often out-competing independent candy stores. Philadelphia's candy industry faced a series of acquisitions and closures in the late 20th and early 21st centuries. Some small-scale family shops managed to survive, however, including the oldest continuously operating confectionery shop in the United States, Shane Confectionery.

In the early 21st century, candy shops became integrated into concession sections of some American movie theatres.

In 2024, there were over 23,000 candy stores across the United States, with Vermont being called "The Candy Capital", with 12.2 confectionery stores per 100,000 residents. In New York City, despite economic difficulties, candy shops were expanding in June 2026, possibly due to the lipstick effect. Some candy shops in the United States focus on importing European candies, especially from Sweden; these newer companies include Bonbon, Lil Sweet Treat and Sockerbit.

=== Oceania ===
==== Australia ====
Sweet marketing and retailing in Australia developed in the 19th century. In Melbourne, a confectioner's shop operated by William Overton was recorded in 1838. During the second half of the 19th century, confectionery manufacturing expanded, with larger producers emerging: James & Robert Black, Dillon & Barfoot, and T. H. Nott.

In the 20th century, manufacturers including MacRobertson's, Hoadley's Chocolates, and Allen's became prominent in the industry. During World War 1, restrictions on British sweet exports and import duties expanded the market for Australian brands.

Confectionery was traditionally sold in shops known as milk bars. These establishments were popular meeting places, which sold loose sweets, including boiled sweets, liquorice, toffees, sherbets, and jelly sweets, as well as other food. Their prominence declined as supermarkets were introduced and schools operated their own food booths.

Local speciality products include Violet Crumble, Cherry Ripe, and Allen's Freckles, alongside internationally marketed brands. Confectionery is now distributed predominantly through supermarkets and other general retailers, although specialist and traditional chocolate shops still operate. In Brisbane, Tom's Confectionery Warehouse operates as the country's largest sweet shop. In 2023, Tom's Confectionery opened a store in Melbourne's Highpoint Shopping Centre and won the Guinness World Record for the largest bulk confectionery (or pick and mix) selection, with 947 varieties of sweets.

Chocolate accounts for approximately 67.3% of Australia's confectionery market value, marketed at US$3.46 billion in 2024.

==== New Zealand ====
Confectionery stores in New Zealand were often close to cinemas and received a lot of their business prior to screenings and at intervals. Once refrigeration was introduced, ice cream became a major seller. These stores had long counters with many confectioneries laid out. There would usually be a set of scales used for weighing the goods for sale.

=== South America ===
==== Brazil ====
Brazil has the largest candy market in South America. Brazilian confectionery started with Portuguese colonisation; as a large amount of sugarcane was planted in the country, sweets became more popular. The first confectionery shop to appear in Brazil was Casa Cavé in 1860, and later another confectionery shop, considered the most famous in the country, Confeitaria Colombo, was inaugurated in 1894. Pelotas has a number of confectionery stores selling traditional sweets. The candy shops of Pelotas date back to the nineteenth century, where upper-class families brought traditional Lusitanian recipes from Portugal, eventually turning into family-operated businesses.

== See also ==
- Concession stand
- List of candies
- Ice cream parlour
- Traveling carnival § Food
