= Nicole Taylor =

Nicole Taylor may refer to:

- Nicole A. Taylor, American cookbook author and podcast host
- Nicole Taylor (cricketer), Australian cricketer
- Nicole Taylor (screenwriter), Scottish screenwriter
- Niki Taylor (born 1975), American model
- Nicole Helen Taylor (1991–2026), American country singer (Taylor Red)
