= Benjamin Dennis IV =

American Gullah Geechee Chef

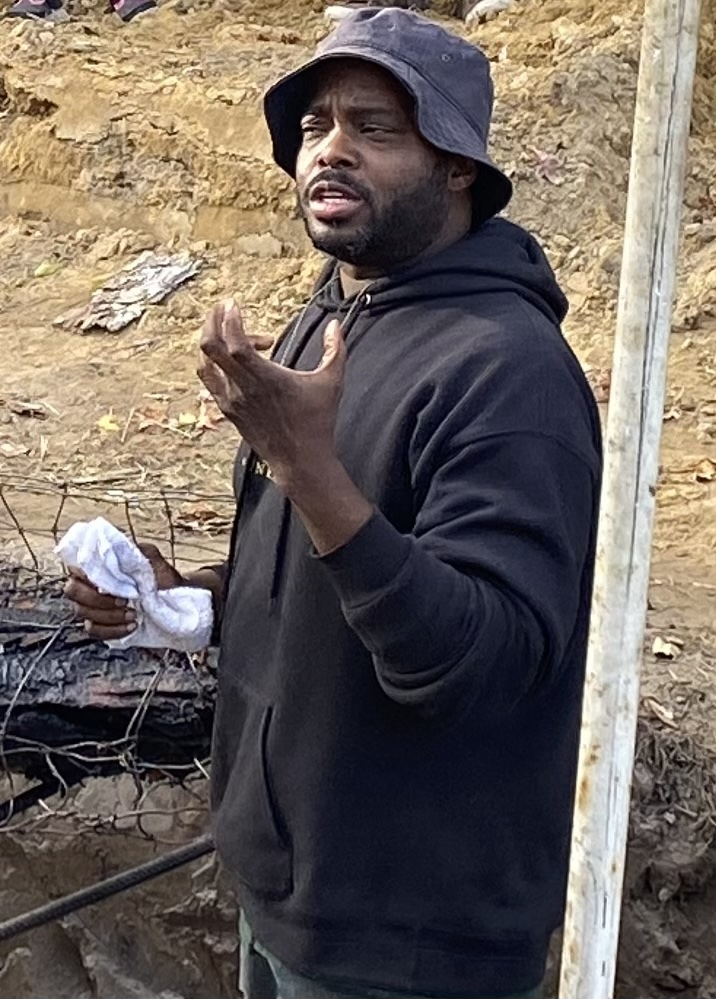
- Born: Charleston
- Alma mater: College of Charleston
- Occupation: Chef, traiteur

Benjamin "BJ" Dennis IV is an American Gullah Geechee chef and caterer from Charleston, South Carolina who is known for preserving Gullah Geechee cooking and culture. Additionally, he is also notable for his discovery of hill rice in December 2016 in Trinidad, which was thought to have been extinct.

== Biography ==
Dennis was born in West Ashley, South Carolina. Dennis has two siblings. Dennis started to learn about cooking from watching and helping his mother and grandparents. He studied at the College of Charleston for one year. He then transferred to Trident Technical College and got a job at Hyman's Seafood. It was at Trident that Dennis changed his major to culinary arts. He later worked as a cook for 82 Queen, Anson's, and Hank's Seafood. In 2004, Dennis traveled to Saint Thomas to work as a cook. In 2011, he became the opening chef at the Cocktail Club. Dennis started a pop-up café in 2012 called "Butcher & Bee" in Charleston, South Carolina.

On March 6, 2015, the Southern Foodways Alliance recorded Dennis' oral history focusing on his Gullah Geechee cooking and culture. In December 2016, he made the discovery of hill rice growing in Trinidad, which was once thought to be extinct.

In 2020, Dennis, Michael Twitty and others were featured in the 4th episode of Padma Lakshmi's show Taste the Nation with Padma Lashmi, which focused on Gullah cuisine.

In 2021, Dennis was featured on Netflix's series High on the Hog: How African American Cuisine Transformed America. One of Dennis' recipes was featured in Bryant Terry's Black Food: Stories, Art, and Recipes from Across the African Diaspora [A Cookbook], which was also released in 2021. That same year, Dennis temporarily moved to Bluffton to start his position as culinary director at the Lowcountry Fresh Market and Cafe. In 2022, he moved back to Charleston.

In an article published by The New York Times on May 9, 2022, Dennis is said to have encouraged Emily Meggett to write the "first high-profile book on Gullah Geechee cooking," which resulted in her publishing Gullah Geechee Home Cooking: Recipes from the Matriarch of Edisto Island.

Dennis has also participated in Charleston Wine + Food event from 2020 to 2023. The Charleston Wine + Food is a local 501(c )(3) nonprofit organization dedicated to promoting Charleston's culinary scene. Dennis' 2022 Charleston Wine + Food event sold out within minutes.

== Career ==
While attending Trident, Dennis began working as a dishwasher at Hyman’s Seafood in Charleston; the experience convinced him to change his major to culinary arts. Over the next several years, he worked at a variety of different restaurants in Charleston, Savannah, St. Thomas, and West Africa. Upon returning to the United States, he began hosting Gullah-Geechee pop-ups.

In 2021, Dennis moved to Bluffton to serve as the culinary director at Lowcountry Fresh Market and Cafe, then returned to Charleston to lead the food program at the International African American Museum.

During the Covid-19 pandemic, Dennis reviewed the manuscript of Emily Meggett's book on Gullah cuisine, at the request of Meggett's son. Soon after, a literary agent asked Dennis if he would be interested in writing a book; he said that the first book on Gullah cuisine should be Meggett's. That book, Gullah Geechee Home Cooking, was published by Abrams Books in 2022. In 2022, Dennis and Nicole A. Taylor were collaborating on a book to be released through Penguin Random House.

Dennis has also participated in the Charleston Wine + Food Festival.

== Filmography ==
- Top Chef (2016–17)
- Parts Unknown: Charleston (2018)
- The Great Soul Food Cook-Off (2021)
- High on the Hog (2021)
- The Underground Railroad (2021)
- Today (2022)
