= Emily Meggett =

American storyteller and chef (1932–2023)

- Born: November 19, 1932; Edisto Island, South Carolina, U.S.
- Died: April 21, 2023 (aged 90); Edisto Island, South Carolina, U.S.
- Other names: M.P.; Ms. Emily
- Known for: Gullah chef; community member; writer
- Notable work: Gullah Geechee Home Cooking: Recipes from the Matriarch of Edisto Island

Emily Meggett (November 19, 1932 – April 21, 2023) was an American Geechee-Gullah community leader, chef, and author who co-wrote Gullah Geechee Home Cooking: Recipes from the Matriarch of Edisto Island in 2022. She lived on Edisto Island, near Charleston, South Carolina.

== Early life ==
Meggett was born on November 19, 1932, in Edisto Island, South Carolina, and grew up with Gullah culture, a set of food, rituals, and language that took roots when West and Central Africans were brought to the Southern United States and enslaved. The culture survives in coastal enclaves in the Carolinas, Georgia, and Florida.

Meggett grew up in a large family. Her parents, Laura V. Hutchinson and Isaiah Fludd, were sharecroppers. She had four siblings and more than a dozen aunts and uncles. When she was young, her family grew vegetables, beans, and fruit, and had a rice pond. The family also raised livestock such as hogs and chickens.

== Career ==
As a teenager, Meggett babysat for local families, but because the pay was bad, her mother suggested finding a higher-paying job or working in the fields. Meggett began cooking and offering home help to wealthy white families, including the Dodge family, who regularly visited Edisto Island from Maine and employed Meggett on and off for 45 years. She also worked as secretary at a community center for 28 years, quitting only after the office received computers.

=== Writing ===
On April 26, 2022, Meggett released Gullah Geechee Home Cooking: Recipes from the Matriarch of Edisto Island, a series of recipes and stories that she co-wrote with American food journalist Kayla Stewart. She had initially intended to self-publish the book, which she and one of her former employers, Becky Smith, had worked on together since 1994. However, Smith's son Elliot, who had been editing the book, asked Charleston chef BJ Dennis for feedback; when Dennis was approached by a literary agent about writing a book, he suggested that Meggett should be the first person to publish a book on Gullah cuisine. The book features 123 recipes central to Gullah culture, such as okra soup, deviled crabs, and chicken perloo, most of which have African antecedents. A featured recipe is for benne wafers, sweet cookies made from benne seeds which slaves brought from Africa and kept in hidden gardens. Her meals feature ingredients like salt pork, rice, and local vegetables.

=== Recognition ===
On July 22, 2022, Rep. Jim Clyburn presented her with the President's Volunteer Service Award. In an accompanying note, President Joe Biden wrote, "we are living in a moment that calls for your hope and your light." Charleston mayor John Tecklenburg declared July 22 "Emily Meggett Day".

== Personal life ==
Meggett was so beloved in the Edisto Island community that, according to The New York Times, "no one charges her for anything." She would leave the side door of her kitchen open to indicate to neighbors that she "has some food ready."

Emily Meggett's husband, Jessie, who predeceased her, was a fellow member of the Gullah culture. He grew up in a two-room cabin that had previously been occupied by slaves. In 2017, his childhood home was moved to the Smithsonian National Museum of African American History and Culture in Washington, D.C.

Meggett had ten children. She attended New First Missionary Baptist Church.

Meggett died on April 21, 2023, at age 90.
