= Fortuin =

Fortuin is a Dutch and Afrikaans surname. Though meaning "fortune" in Dutch, the name usually appears derived from the French surname Fortin ("small fort"). Variant spellings are Fortuijn and Fortuyn, each pronounced [fɔrˈtœyn] in Dutch. People with this surname include:

- Aston Fortuin (born 1996), South African rugby player
- Bevin Fortuin (1979–2025), South African rugby player
- Bjorn Fortuin (born 1994), South African cricketer
- Cees M. Fortuin (born 1940), Dutch mathematician; the "F" in the FKG inequality and the FK cluster model
- Clyde Fortuin (born 1995), South African cricketer
- Gregory Fortuin, South African businessman in Australia and New Zealand
- Harold Fortuin (born 1964), American composer and pianist
- Irene Fortuyn (born 1959), Dutch sculptor and installation artist
- Nicole Fortuin (born 1992, South African actress
- Pim Fortuijn, later Pim Fortuyn (1948–2002), Dutch social scientist and politician

== See also ==
- Fortuyn (disambiguation)
