= Gabrielle E.W. Carter =

American cultural preservationist

- Occupation: Historic preservationist, cook, filmmaker

Gabrielle E. W. Carter is a cultural preservationist, artist, co-founder of Tall Grass Food Box, and creator of Revival Taste Collective. She is one of the main characters on the Netflix documentary series High on the Hog: How African American Cuisine Transformed America that debuted on May 26, 2021. She was also the subject of a short film documentary The Seeds We Keep by the Oxford American.

== Early life ==
Carter was born around 1990. She attended the Academy of Art University in San Francisco. Before she got into the food business, Carter had a career in fashion and marketing in New York City. She started helping her friends' food businesses and various food charities and even became a line cook while doing research with chef JJ Johnson on Oryza glaberrima.

== Tall Grass Food ==
In 2018, Carter moved to Apex, North Carolina to live with her great-grandfather on their family farm so that she could record family's stories. At the beginning of the COVID-19 pandemic in 2020, Carter alongside her partner Derrick Beasley, and friend Gerald Harris founded the Tall Grass Food Box to support Black farmers. Tall Grass Food Box is based on a community-supported agriculture model (CSA). She created a supper series called the Revival Taste Collective, where she hosts guest on her family farm and features foods from local Black farmers and stories about their agricultural traditions.

Carter was featured as one of the 12 Under 35: Breakout Talent to Watch by the Specialty Food Association in 2020. In 2021, Carter's work and her family's own farming history is highlighted on Netflix's television series High on the Hog.
