= Markets in Benin =

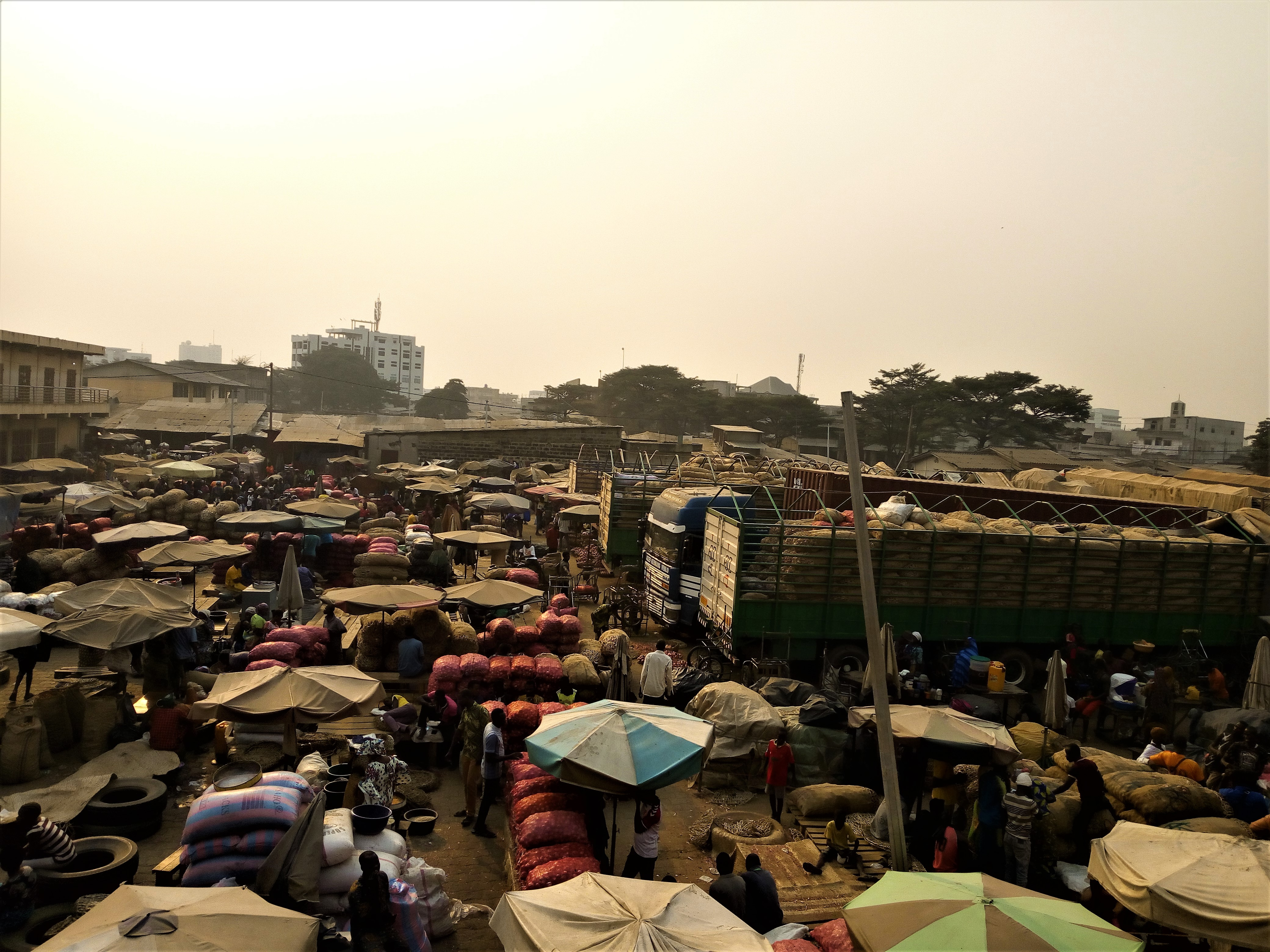
Dantokpa Market

Fresh (wet) markets occur in most towns and villages in Benin, usually surrounded by large numbers of small shops selling foods, consumer items, imported foods and goods, clothing, household goods, etc. With a large portion of the population producing much of their own food, particularly for starches, open markets are where the diet is rounded out with items not self-produced. For those with higher incomes, more of the food consumed is purchased at market. Most vegetables are in villages and town markets, which usually have a major day, or multiple days, where traders and retailers are active in selling perishables in particular. Fish, meats, staple starch crops, legumes, soy and milk cheeses, fruits, and vegetables are available in the market every week of the year in most places with significant variations in the quantity supplied. Staple crops are usually sold to retailers by wholesalers, who obtain them from the producers. Meat is sold by the butchers who source from the producers. The source of vegetables depends on the season. Regional trade keeps a selection of vegetables available, with price and quantity fluctuations depending on the season. Visits to markets in the Parakou and Nikki areas observed avocados from Lomé in Togo and red onions from Niger. Eastern border markets have many Nigerian traders coming into Benin to purchase fruits and vegetables for sale in Nigeria. Most of these transactions are not captured in either of the countries' statistical records. Vegetables traders/retailers obtain their products either from the intermediary traders or directly at the farm gate if possible. For many items there are unwritten agreements that producers will sell to retailers, not directly to consumers. Intermediaries buy at the farms and transport the products directly to their various market destinations. Women dominate the role of vegetable retailers at these open markets. Vegetable producers market much of their produce in bulk at harvest time because of the highly perishable nature of their products. In general, producers conduct all of their sales immediately after harvest. The long marketing channel of vegetables in the larger peri-urban and urban areas involves several types of intermediaries, from local traders to wholesalers. Studies by INRAB have shown that producers are more inefficient in marketing than in production. There is a lack of market participation of farmers and current barriers to entry by farmers limit their access to markets.

The development of supermarkets in Cotonou, the primary city of Benin, is still extremely low. Erevan is the only major supermarket/hypermarket based in Cotonou. Headquartered in France, Erevan imports 90% of products from France, either by air or sea freight depending on the commodity and level of demand. They pay extra costs to their freight forwarder to include door-to-door delivery service, since there are no third-party refrigerated transportation providers that provide that service. Erevan pays that extra cost to ensure that their product maintains European Union Standards for food safety and handling when perishable products are being transferred to their store. Some fresh products are locally procured, but this remains very limited.

Markets in Benin include:

- Dantokpa Market: This market, located in Cotonou, is the largest open-air market in West Africa.
- Malanville Grain Market: This market functions twice a week and is located on the bank of the River Niger, in the northeast of Benin and shares the border with Niger Republic and northwest Nigeria, Kebbi State. A bridge spans the Niger River linking Benin to Niger Republic. Massive movement of grains and other commodities in trucks was observed and the offloading of commodities from Benin and neighboring countries was regular. Corn, beans, rice, peanuts, cashews, pineapples, cassava, yams, and other various tubers from Benin are sold to mostly traders from Niger Republic. Traders from the Niger Republic bring different types of beans, including soybeans, to sell in Benin. Corn sold for about US$45 per 100 kg bag (July 2013) at that market while price for the same quantity is approximately US$39 in Nigeria. Like Nigerian farmers, corn farmers in Benin feared becoming uncompetitive if Nigeria permits free imports of corn.
- N'Dali and surrounding area markets: The main marketday here is on Saturday. This major east–west major crossroad market's selection of goods there ranged from locally grown staple crops such as yam, corn, tomatoes, rice, eggplant leaves, to beans brought down from Malanville and imported parboiled rice. For items like onions or soap, the item price is kept constant while adjustments are made on the quantity sold for that fixed price. Dissimilarly, prices for a measure of grains are adjusted based on wholesale purchase prices. Interestingly, cow milk and soy cheese (tofu) are also available. The cattle killed and sold in this market are either local or brought down from Malanville, and it was thought that some of these cattle pass through N'Dali on their way to Nigeria. West of N'Dali up to Sokodumnou village (about 40–50 miles from N'Dali center) are dry vast lands featuring piles of harvested cotton and nomadic cattle rearing. Village markets along the road are also not regular and states of food items displayed for sale at these markets indicate obvious scarcity and poverty. People at these markets are predominantly older, with few young ones. Many cannot speak French (Benin's official language) beyond a few words, indicating that they receive little if any formal education.
- Nikki Market: Market day here falls on Thursday and is held every 4 days. Similar to N'Dali, a variety of goods are being sold on that non-market day. The Nikki market is bigger in size and traffic than the N'Dalimarket.
- Derassi Cattle Market: Held every Wednesday, the Derassi Cattle Marketplace is located between Nikki and Peonga, on the side of a dirt road. Despite its remote location, it bustles with hundreds of people coming from various locations within Benin and Nigeria. On one market day visited, 132 cattle had been sold before noon. This was an increase of 30 cattle over the 102 sold the year before according to their record book. The number of cattle sold can reach 180 at the peak of the rainy season, in July, while it dwindles in the dry season, as the cattlemen and their herds move away in search of green pasture and water. Depending on the size and health status of the cattle, prices range between 60,000 CFA for a small cow and up to 800,000 CFA for a big bull. Similarly, sheep and goats prices range between 15,000 CFA and 60,000 CFA per animal, but can be sold at 100,000 CFA for the Muslim holiday called Tabaski. Because of the nomadic culture of cattlemen, conflicts with local farmers arise over for damaged crops and reduced harvests due to grazing.
