= My Soul Looks Back =

Memoir

My Soul Looks Back: A Memoir
- Author: Jessica B. Harris
- Language: English
- Subject: Autobiography
- Genre: Memoir
- Publisher: Scribner
- Publication date: 2017
- Pages: 255
- ISBN: 978-1-5011-2590-4 (Hardcover)

My Soul Looks Back: A Memoir is a memoir by cookbook author and food historian Jessica B. Harris, particularly describing on her life and friendships with major black writers including James Baldwin, Maya Angelou, and Toni Morrison in New York City in the 1970s.

== Publication history ==
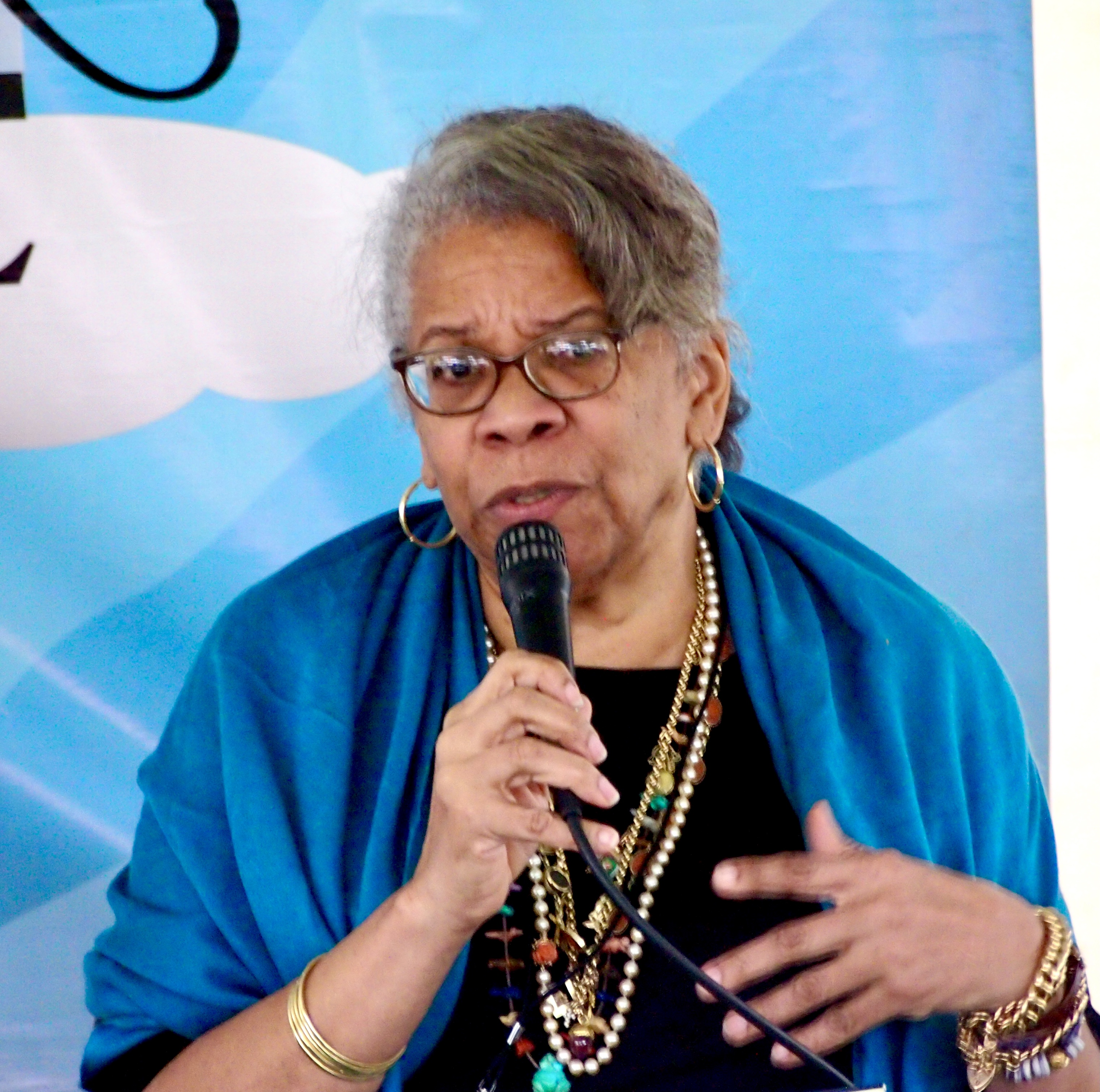
Harris in 2017

Harris published the 255-page book with Scribner on March 9, 2017.

== Content and reception ==
Publishers Weekly described the book as "a lively, entertaining, and informative recounting of a time and place that shaped and greatly enriched American culture," namely Harris's life as a young person in New York City in the 1970s amid black authors including James Baldwin, Maya Angelou, and Toni Morrison; Harris was introduced to this circle through her romantic relationship with Sam Floyd, Baldwin's best friend. Reviewing the book for The New York Times, critic Dwight Garner described it as having a "simmering warmth" and "was never, to this reader, uninteresting" even if it also had a "softness of focus", suggesting at times the book fails to "recall the best lines and jokes" from the literati Harris describes.
