= Hyman's Seafood =

Historic seafood restaurant in the United States

- Interactive map of Hyman's Seafood

Restaurant information
- Established: 1890
- Owners: Eli Hyman; Victor Hyman
- Location: 215 Meeting Street, Charleston, South Carolina, 29401, United States
- Coordinates: 32°46′54″N 79°55′55″W
- Website: hymanseafood.com

Hyman's Seafood is a seafood restaurant in Charleston, South Carolina in the United States. The restaurant is a fifth-generation family business owned by the Hyman family.

== Background ==
Hyman's Seafood was originally established in 1890 by Jewish immigrant W.M. Karesh (the great-grandfather of the current owners) as a wholesale dry goods general store and small tavern. In 1924, the business was renamed "Hyman's Wholesale Company." The business opened its deli in 1986 and the full seafood restaurant in 1987. The restaurant offers a large selection of fresh-caught fish and a variety of shellfish. The restaurant has recently gained increased attention from South Carolina Shrimpers as seafood offerings, like shrimp, are misrepresented as local, despite being imported.

Chef Benjamin Dennis IV worked as Hyman's Seafood as a dishwasher, and the early job inspired him to pursue a career in the culinary arts. Comedian Dusty Slay was also an employee at Hyman's, and has included the restaurant in his comedy set.

Because the restaurant is next door to the Charleston Place Hotel, it has been frequented by celebrities and entertainers. There are brass plaques on the tables and walls to denote who dined there.

=== Awards ===
Hyman's Seafood has been ranked as one of the world's 150 'legendary restaurants' in TasteAtlas. The restaurant has also been included as a South Carolina "Must See" in the Michelin Guide.

== In popular culture ==
The restaurant was mentioned in the 2012 novel, Dead Low Tide, by Bret Lott.

== See also ==
- List of seafood restaurants
