= High on the Hog (book) =

2011 book by Jessica B. Harris

First edition

High on the Hog: A Culinary Journey from Africa to America is a historical non-fiction book by Jessica B. Harris, published in 2011 by Bloomsbury. The book chronicles the development of African-American cuisine from its origins in African cuisines.

David A. Davis of Mercer University described the book as "the culmination of her career-long research into African-American foodways".

== Contents ==
There are recipes in the book, totalling 15 of the 304 pages.

== Adaptation ==
A Netflix television series, High on the Hog: How African American Cuisine Transformed America, released in 2021 was based on the book. Osayi Endolyn, in The New York Times, stated the television series was "sorely overdue".

== Reception ==
The book won the 2012 International Association for Culinary Professionals prize for culinary history.

Dwight Garner of The New York Times praised the book, stating that it had "an eye for detail and an inquisitive manner" and "plain, gently simmering prose". Garner stated that in regards to the portions from the mid-20th century to the present, the portions were those he "especially enjoyed". William Grimes, of the same newspaper, stated that the author "handles the cultural politics of black cuisine skillfully".

Davis called the book "engaging, accessible, and valuable", and argued it is a "valuable contribution".

Jennifer Jensen Wallach of the University of North Texas stated that the work is "engaging, readable, and impressive in its chronological scope".

Vanessa Bush of Booklist described the work as a "passionate perspective" that the photographs had "enhance[d]".

Kirkus Reviews criticized the book, and summarized its review by stating that the author "folds into her batter so many weighty ingredients that it fails to rise".
