= High on the Hog: How African American Cuisine Transformed America =

2021 American television series

- Genre: Documentary
- Starring: Stephen Satterfield; Gabrielle E.W. Carter; Jessica B. Harris
- Country of origin: United States
- Original language: English
- No. of seasons: 2
- No. of episodes: 8

Production
- Running time: 47–58 minutes
- Production companies: One Story Up Productions; Pilgrim Media Group

Original release
- Network: Netflix
- Release: May 26, 2021 – present

High on the Hog: How African American Cuisine Transformed America is a television docuseries released on Netflix on May 26, 2021, starring Stephen Satterfield, Gabrielle E.W. Carter and Jessica B. Harris. In August 2021, the series was renewed for a second season.

Osayi Endolyn, in The New York Times, stated the television series was "sorely overdue."

It is based on the book High on the Hog: A Culinary Journey from Africa to America.

== Cast ==
- Stephen Satterfield
- Gabrielle E.W. Carter
- Jessica B. Harris
- Romuald Hazoumé
- Benjamin Dennis IV

== Episodes ==
Series overview
Season	Episodes	Originally released
1	4	May 26, 2021
2	4	November 22, 2023

=== Season 1 (2021) ===
No. overall	No. in season	Title	Original release date
1	1	"Our Roots"	May 26, 2021
2	2	"The Rice Kingdom"	May 26, 2021
3	3	"Our Founding Chefs"	May 26, 2021
4	4	"Freedom"	May 26, 2021

=== Season 2 (2023) ===
No. overall	No. in season	Title	Original release date
5	1	"Food for the Journey"	November 22, 2023
6	2	"The Black Mecca"	November 22, 2023
7	3	"The Defiance"	November 22, 2023
8	4	"Feeding the Culture"	November 22, 2023

== Accolades ==
- 2021 Peabody Award Winner
- 2022 NAACP Image Award for Best Documentary Series
