= Stephen Satterfield =

Culinary professional and television host

- Born: April 18, 1985 (age 41); Atlanta, Georgia
- Occupation: Food Writer
- Website: stephensatterfield.com

Stephen A. Satterfield (born April 18, 1985) is an African-American food writer, producer, and media entrepreneur. He is the television host of 2021 Netflix docu-series High on the Hog: How African American Cuisine Transformed America.

== Biography ==
=== Early life ===
Satterfield was born April 18, 1985, at Crawford Long Hospital in Atlanta, Georgia to parents Sam and Debbie Satterfield. His family lived in Stone Mountain, Georgia and Decatur, Georgia during his childhood. He attended The Westminster Schools in Atlanta, Georgia and graduated from The Holy Innocents School in Sandy Springs, Georgia in 2002.

=== Career ===
After attending the University of Oregon for one year, Satterfield attended culinary school at the Western Culinary Institute in Portland, Oregon. He became a sommelier by age 21.

In 2007, he founded the International Society of Africans in Wine, a non-profit foundation to support Black winemakers in Africa. He moved to San Francisco in 2010 and became manager of the farm-to-table restaurant Nopa. In 2016, he cofounded Whetstone, a quarterly magazine exploring food history and culture. In 2018, he founded Whetstone Media. The company partnered with iHeartRadio to launch the food anthropology podcast Point of Origin as an audio adaptation of the magazine.

Satterfield was the host of the Netflix docu-series High on the Hog: How African American Cuisine Transformed America released in May 2021.

== Philosophical views ==
Satterfield endeavors to consider food holistically as a means of connecting to the human experience and better understanding the world. He works to bring diverse viewpoints to food writing.

== Honors and awards ==
Satterfield was selected as a 2016 Food Writing Fellow by The Culinary Trust and assigned to work on the website Civil Eats.
