= Harold Fortuin =

American classical composer (born 1964)

Harold Fortuin (born 1964 in Mount Clemens, Michigan) is an American composer, pianist, and designer of hardware and software for electronic music.

He has written both traditional instrumental and vocal music as well as electronic and computer music, and has a number of performances and recordings to his credit. His work has often been in the realm of microtonal music. Aside from the standard 12-tone equal temperament, he has composed in equal temperaments of 19, 22, and 31 notes to the octave. He has also published research in the area of software and hardware design and development.
