= Fortuyn =

Fortuyn can refer to:

- Pim Fortuyn (1948–2002), Dutch politician
- Fortuyn, a Dutch sailing ship under Hendrick Christiaensen that explored New Netherland in the 1610s
- Fortuyn, a Dutch sailing ship under Jan Jacobsz Vrijer that was sent on a whaling expedition to Svalbard with Muyden's Neptunus in 1613
- Fortuyn (1722), a Dutch sailing ship that sank on its maiden voyage in 1724 after leaving the Cape of Good Hope bound for Batavia
