= Jessica B. Harris =

American culinary historian (born 1948)

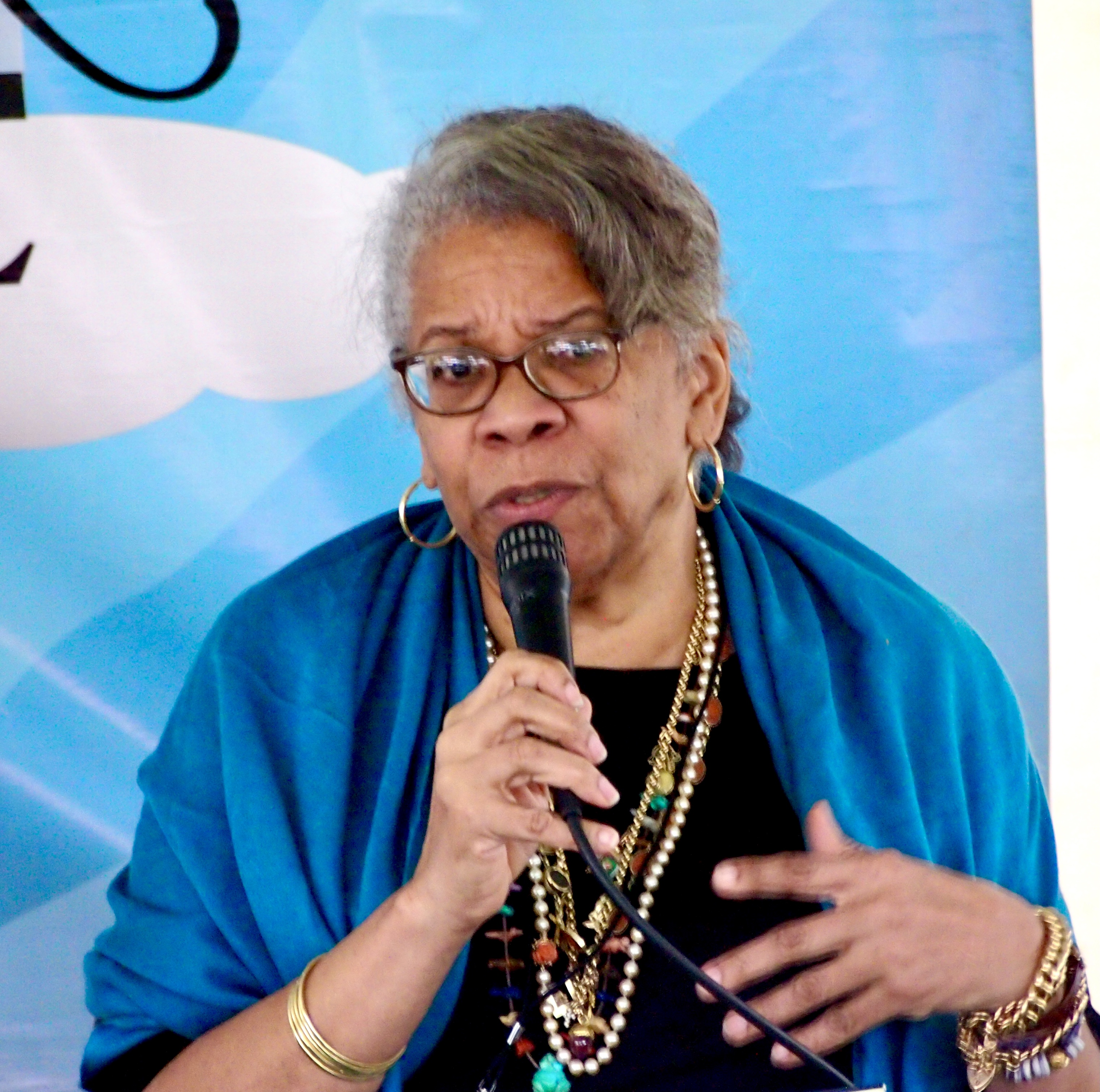
- Born: March 18, 1948 (age 78); Queens, New York, U.S.
- Education: Bryn Mawr College; Queens College, City University of New York; New York University
- Writing career
- Genres: Nonfiction, memoir
- Subjects: Culinary history, personal history, New York City, the 1970s and 1980s, African diaspora
- Notable work: High on the Hog (2011)
- Notable awards: James Beard Award
- Website: www.africooks.com/wordpress/

Jessica B. Harris (born March 18, 1948) is an American culinary historian, college professor, cookbook author and journalist. She is professor emerita at Queens College, City University of New York, where she taught for 50 years, and is also the author of 15 books, including cookbooks, non-fiction food writing and memoir. She has twice won James Beard Foundation Awards, including for Lifetime Achievement in 2020, and her book High on the Hog was adapted in 2021 as a four-part Netflix series by the same name.

== Early life ==
Jessica B. Harris, an only child, was born in Queens, New York, in 1948. Her family also had a summer home on Martha's Vineyard. From 1953 to 1961, Harris attended the United Nations International School in New York City. She graduated from the High School of Performing Arts when she was 16 years old, and went on to earn an A.B. degree in French from Bryn Mawr College (1968). Her junior year at Bryn Mawr, Harris studied in Paris, France. Following graduation, Harris returned to France to study at the Universite de Nancy for one year. She then earned her master's degree from Queens College (1971) and a Ph.D. from New York University (1983). In 1972, Harris traveled to West Africa to work on her doctoral dissertation.

== Career ==
In the 1970s, Harris worked as a journalist before becoming a food writer. She was book review editor at Essence and theater critic for New York Amsterdam News, the United States' oldest black newspaper. From July to November in 1999, she worked as a resident food historian for Sara Moulton's Cooking Live Primetime. She has also appeared on various other television shows such as The Today Show, The Main Ingredient, The Curtis Aikens Show, and Good Morning America.

Harris is professor emerita in the English Department at Queens College/C.U.N.Y, where she taught for 50 years. She was the inaugural scholar in residence in the Ray Charles Chair in African American Material Culture at Dillard University in New Orleans. She also founded the Institute for the Study of Culinary Cultures at Dillard. She hosts a monthly program, My Welcome Table, on Heritage Radio Network. She has published 12 books. Her primary subjects are the culinary history, foodways and recipes of the African diaspora. Harris was a 2004 winner of the lifetime achievement awards from the Southern Foodways Alliance and a 2010 James Beard Foundation special award honoree. In 2017 she published a memoir My Soul Looks Back.

In May 2021, Netflix released a four-episode series High on the Hog: How African American Cuisine Transformed America based on Harris' 2011 book High on the Hog: A Culinary Journey from Africa to America. In 2020, she won a James Beard Foundation Award for Lifetime Achievement. In September 2021, she appeared on the Time 100, Time's annual list of the 100 most influential people in the world.

== Personal life ==
Harris resides in Brooklyn, Martha's Vineyard and New Orleans.

== Works and publications ==
- Hot Stuff: A Cookbook in Praise of the Piquant, Atheneum, 1985 – 278 pages
- Sky Juice and Flying Fish: Tastes Of A Continent, Simon & Schuster, 1991 – 240 pages
- Tasting Brazil: Regional Recipes and Reminiscences, Macmillan, 1992 – 285 pages
- The World Beauty Book: How We Can All Look and Feel Wonderful Using the Natural Beauty Secrets of Women of Color, HarperSanFrancisco, 1995 – 211 pages
- The Welcome Table: African-American Heritage Cooking, Simon & Schuster, February 2, 1995 – 285 pages
- On the Side: More Than 100 Recipes for the Sides, Salads, and Condiments that Make the Meal, Simon & Schuster, 1998 – 176 pages
- A Kwanzaa Keepsake: Celebrating the Holiday with New Traditions and Feasts, Simon & Schuster, 1998 – 176 pages
- The Africa Cookbook: Tastes of a Continent, Simon and Schuster, 1998 – 382 pages
- Iron Pots & Wooden Spoons: Africa's Gifts to New World Cooking, Simon & Schuster, February 3, 1999 – 224 pages
- Beyond Gumbo: Creole Fusion Food from the Atlantic Rim, Simon & Schuster, February 25, 2003 – 400 pages
- High on the Hog: A Culinary Journey from Africa to America, Bloomsbury Publishing USA, January 11, 2011 – 304 pages
- Rum Drinks: 50 Caribbean Cocktails, From Cuba Libre to Rum Daisy, Chronicle Books, July 23, 2013 – 168 pages
- The Martha's Vineyard Table, Chronicle Books, July 30, 2013 – 204 pages
- My Soul Looks Back, Scribner, 2017 - 244 pages
- Vintage Postcards from the African World: In the Dignity of Their Work and the Joy of Their Play, University Press of Mississippi, 2020 - 152 pages
