= Nicole Taylor (cricketer) =

Australian cricketer

Domestic team information
- Years: Team
- 1996/97: Victoria

Career statistics
Competition	WLA
Matches	2
Runs scored	–
Batting average	–
100s/50s	–
Top score	–
Balls bowled	18
Wickets	0
Bowling average	–
5 wickets in innings	–
10 wickets in match	–
Best bowling	–
Catches/stumpings	0/–
- Source: CricketArchive, 30 June 2021

Nicole Taylor is a former Australian cricketer. She played two List A matches for Victoria during the 1996–97 season of the Women's National Cricket League (WNCL).
