= Benne wafer =

Sesame seed cookies

Benne wafers (also known as benne seed wafers) are thin sesame seed cookies with African origins. They are a traditional Lowcountry food most associated with South Carolina and its city, Charleston.

== History ==
The word benne means "sesame", and comes from one of the languages of West Africa. Benne seeds first came to the U.S. via ships carrying enslaved Africans. Enslaved peoples would grow benne plants in their own small gardens on Lowcountry plantations. The plantation owners also grew benne with the intent that its oil could be used as a cheaper alternative to imported olive oil.
