= Nicole A. Taylor =

American cookbook author

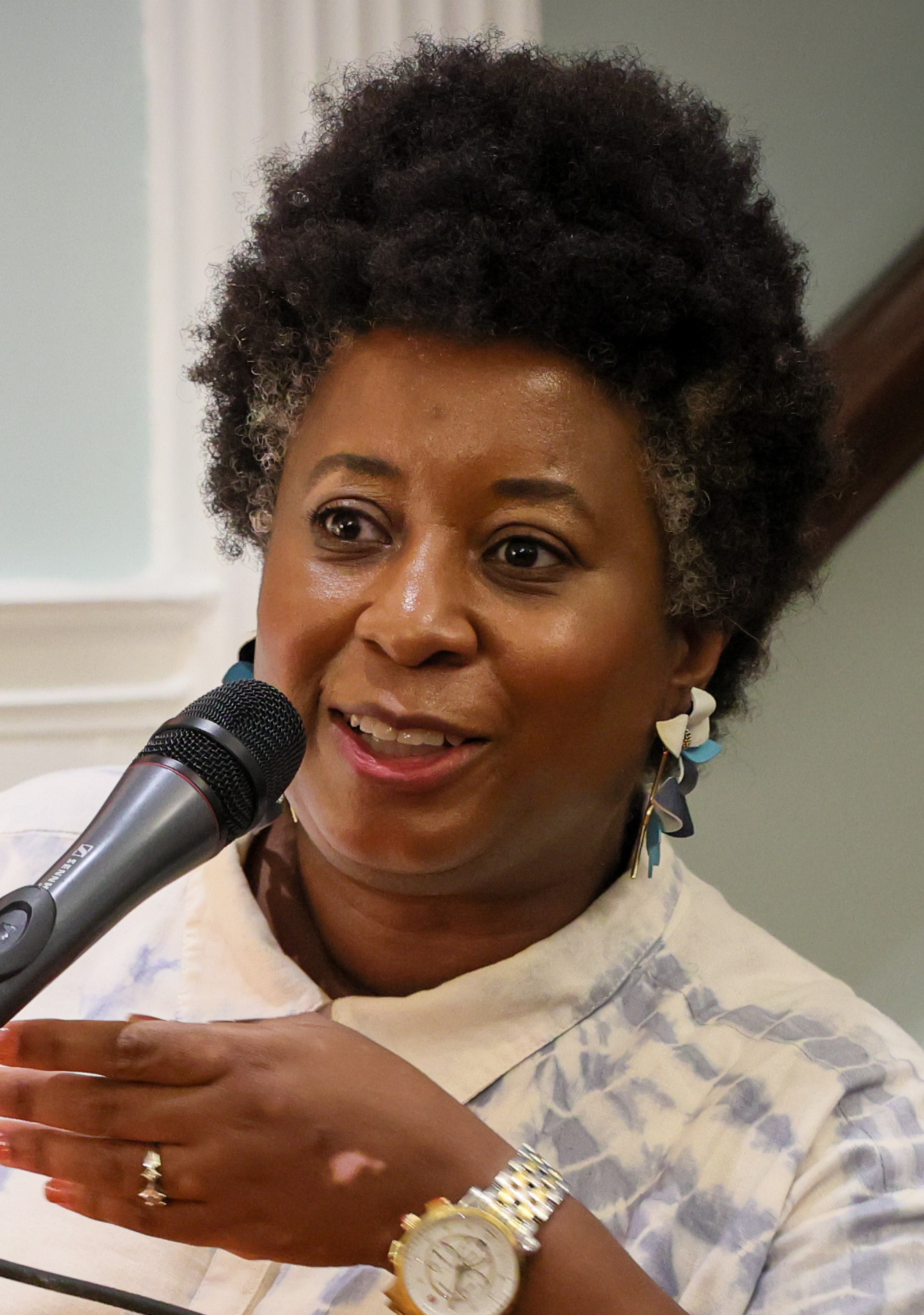
Taylor in 2023

Nicole A. Taylor is an American writer and cookbook author. Originally from Georgia, she moved to Brooklyn, New York in 2008 which became the basis for her 2015 cookbook, The Up South Cookbook: Chasing Dixie in a Brooklyn Kitchen. Taylor's food writing has twice been nominated for a James Beard Foundation Award. She has also hosted a podcast called Hot Grease.

== Biography ==
Raised in Athens, Georgia, Taylor lived in Atlanta for 12 years. She moved to Brooklyn in 2008, which ultimately led to her cookbook The Up South Cookbook: Chasing Dixie in a Brooklyn Kitchen (Countryman Press, 2015). Developed over three years, the book contains more than 100 recipes which Nneka Okona described in Brooklyn Magazine as "approachable for even novice cooks and all...restorative because they’re accompanied not only by instruction but also a story, a context for why the dish means something to [Taylor] on a deeper level...making Up South as much a cookbook as a narrative. Stories to move you. Stories you can feel in the same way good food, true comfort food, feeds and nourishes your soul and spirit." Writing in The New Republic, Stacia L. Brown similarly described the cookbook as "combined personal history, migration story, and recipe collection." NBC News called it a "must-have" cookbook for southern soul cooking and Essence, USA Today, Paste Magazine and Yahoo Food all named it to lists of best cookbooks in 2015. Yahoo praised Taylor's "knack for using new ingredients and her own personal experiences to create wholly original interpretations."

In 2017, Brooklyn Magazine named Taylor to its list of 100 influential people in Brooklyn culture, citing her work on The Up South Cookbook as well as her earlier podcast on food culture called Hot Grease, which aired on the Heritage Radio Network from 2009 to 2013.

Taylor served as director of special projects for chef Claus Meyer's Brownsville Community Culinary Center.

In 2020, Taylor was nominated for two James Beard Foundation Awards, in the categories of Best Personal Essay, Short Form, and Innovative Storytelling.

Her second cookbook, Watermelon & Red Birds: A Cookbook for Juneteenth and Black Celebrations, was published in 2022 by Simon & Schuster.
