= Burhop's Seafood =

American seafood retailer

- Type: Private
- Industry: Seafood
- Founded: 1926; 100 years ago
- Founder: Albert E. Burhop
- Headquarters: Chicago, Illinois, United States
- Products: Shellfish, Fin Fish, Gourmet Meals, Soup, Cooking Condiments
- Website: burhopsseafood.com

Burhop's Seafood is a privately owned seafood retailer and one-time wholesaler and full-service restaurant founded in 1926 by Albert E. Burhop in Chicago, Illinois.

The company is best known for having partnered with Clarence Birdseye in the 1920s to transport refrigerated seafood into the Midwestern United States for the first time. As a result of this partnership, Burhop's became the largest supplier of seafood to fine restaurants, hotels, and private clubs in Chicago for much of the twentieth century. Per the Chicago Tribune, by 1988 Burhop's was the largest group of retail seafood stores in the United States.

In recommending Burhop's to readers in the 2007 edition of its travel guide The Food Lover's Guide to Chicago, Chicago Magazine called the distributor "a famous name in the Chicago area for 81 years." The company's seafood is regularly recommended by the Chicago Tribune and other local media.

== History ==
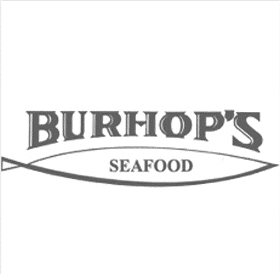
Original Burhop's logo from 1926.

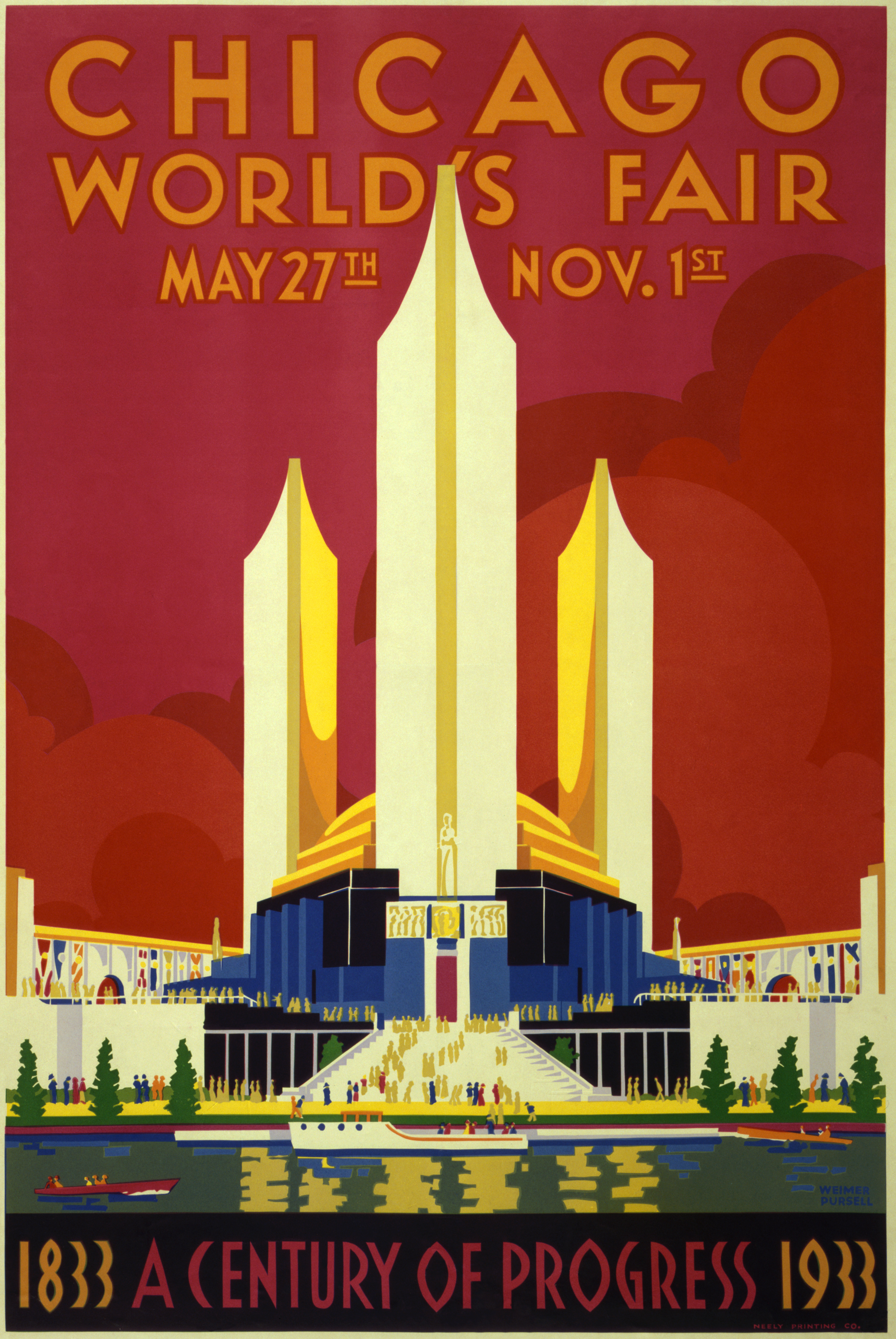
A 1933 World's Fair poster. Burhop's provided seafood for the event.

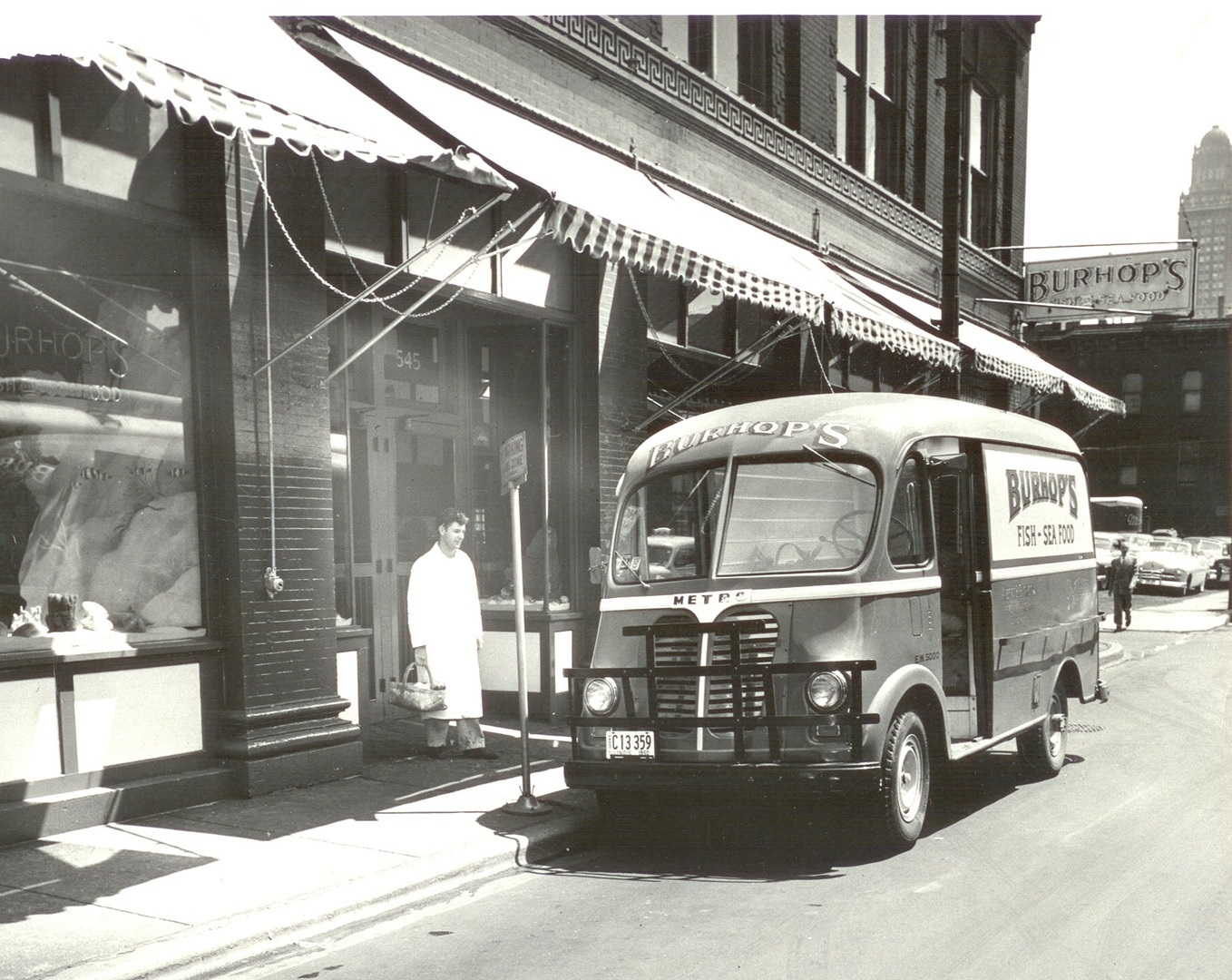
The North State St. location in 1952.

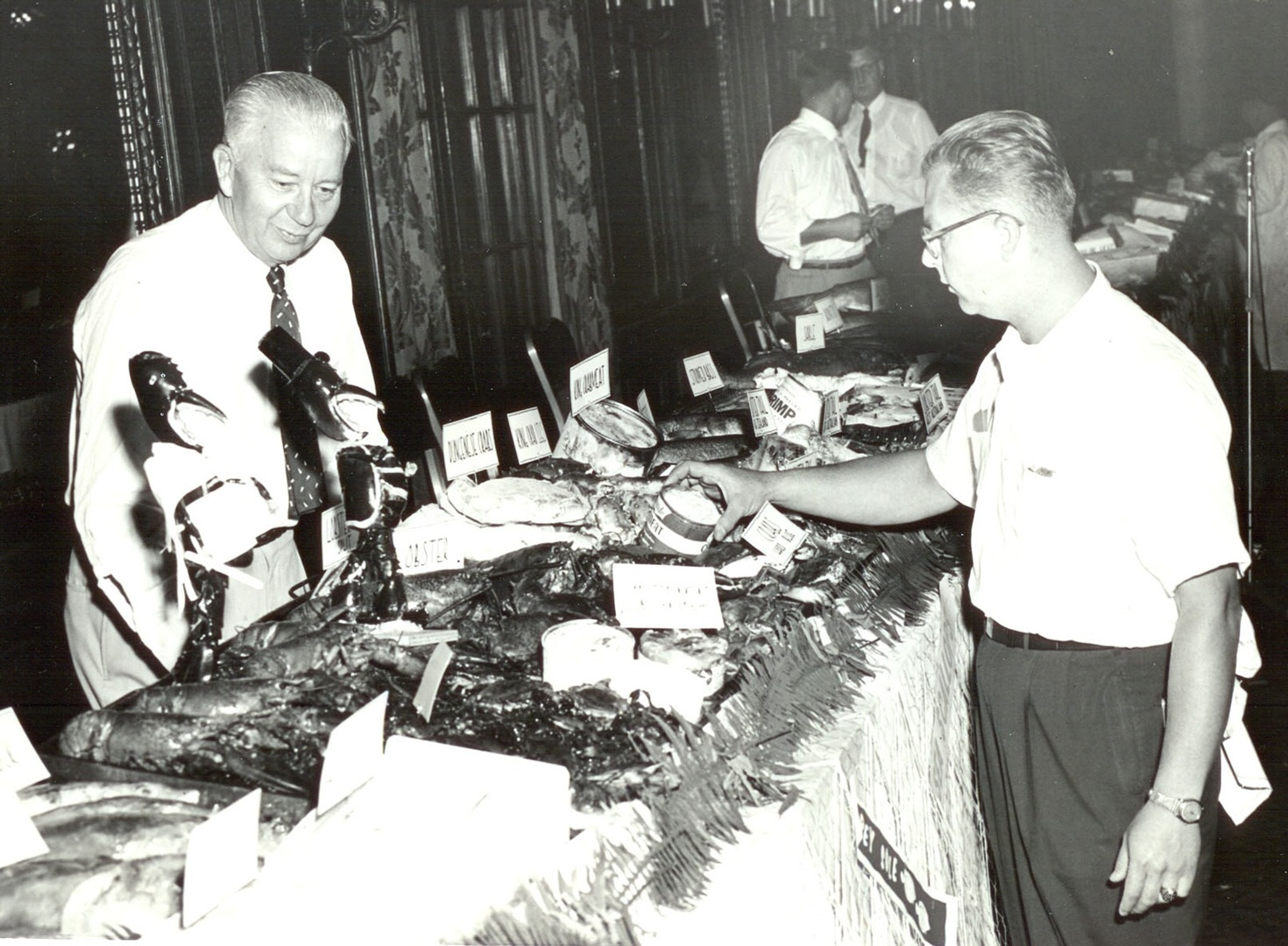
Burhop's founder Albert E. Burhop (left) with his son, Vernon, in 1952.

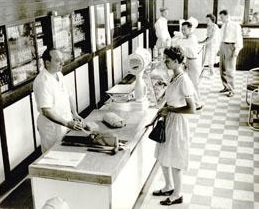
LaSalle St. seafood counter in 1952.

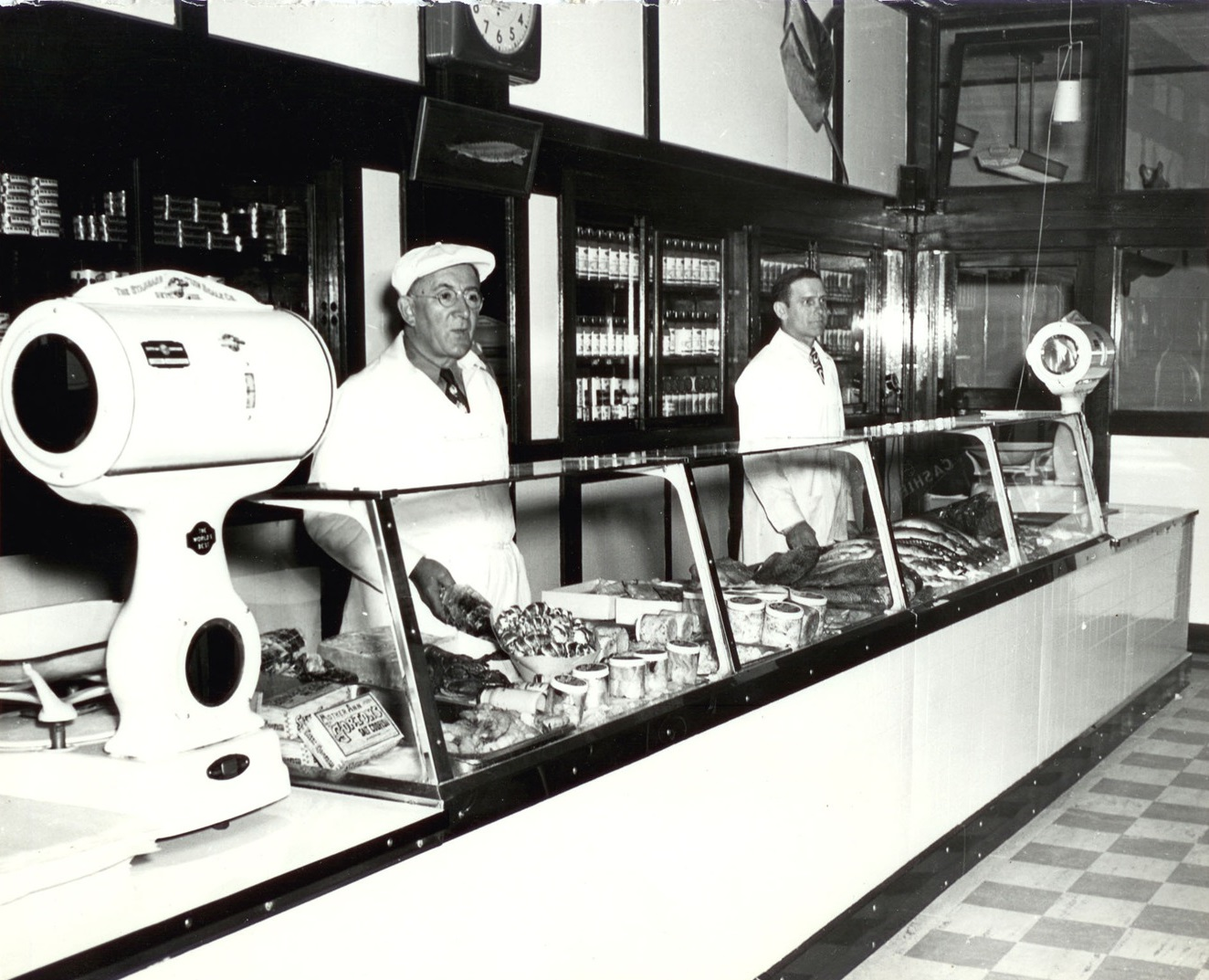
Inside the State St. location (1952).

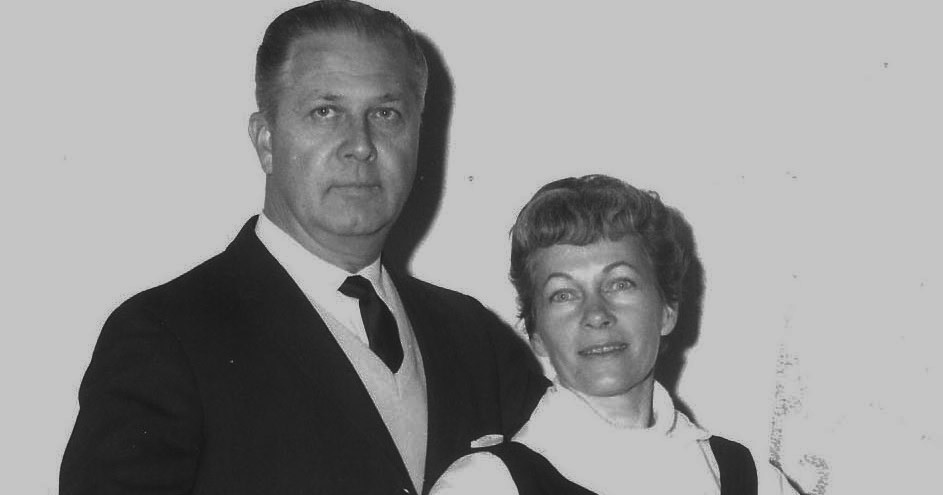
Vernon Burhop with his wife, Janis.

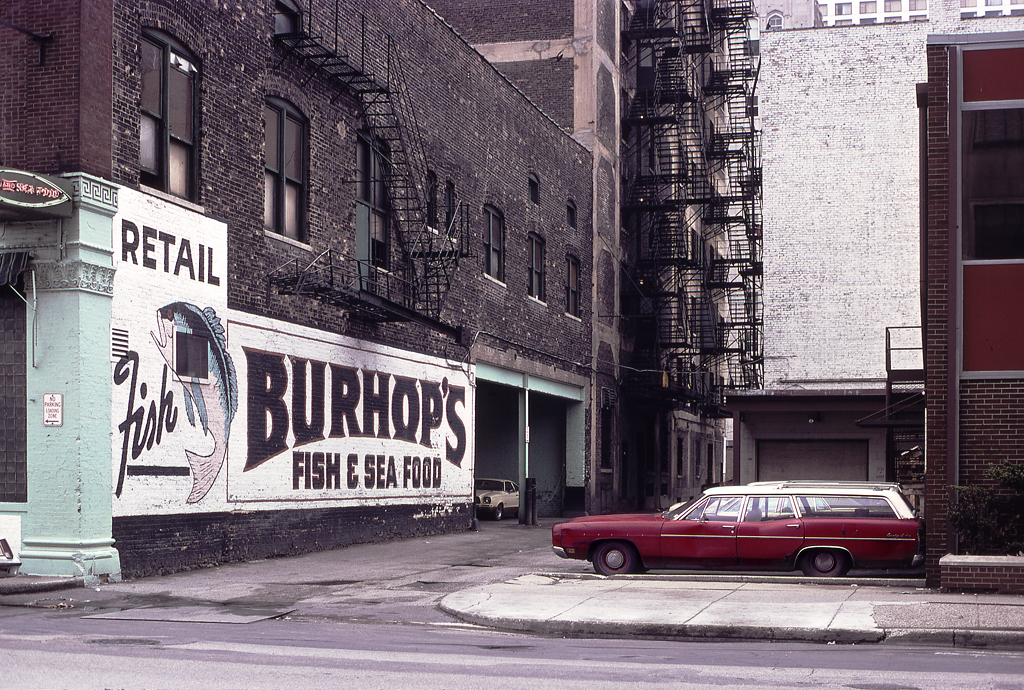
Advertisement for Burhop's, 1979.

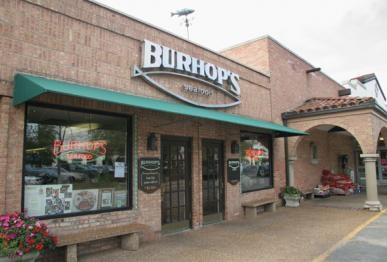
Burhop's Wilmette, Illinois location.

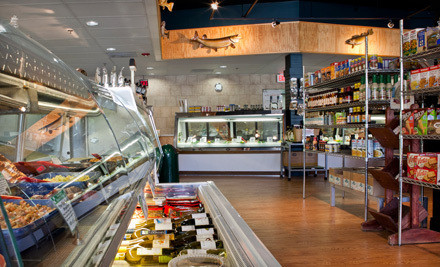
Burhop's Hinsdale, Illinois location.

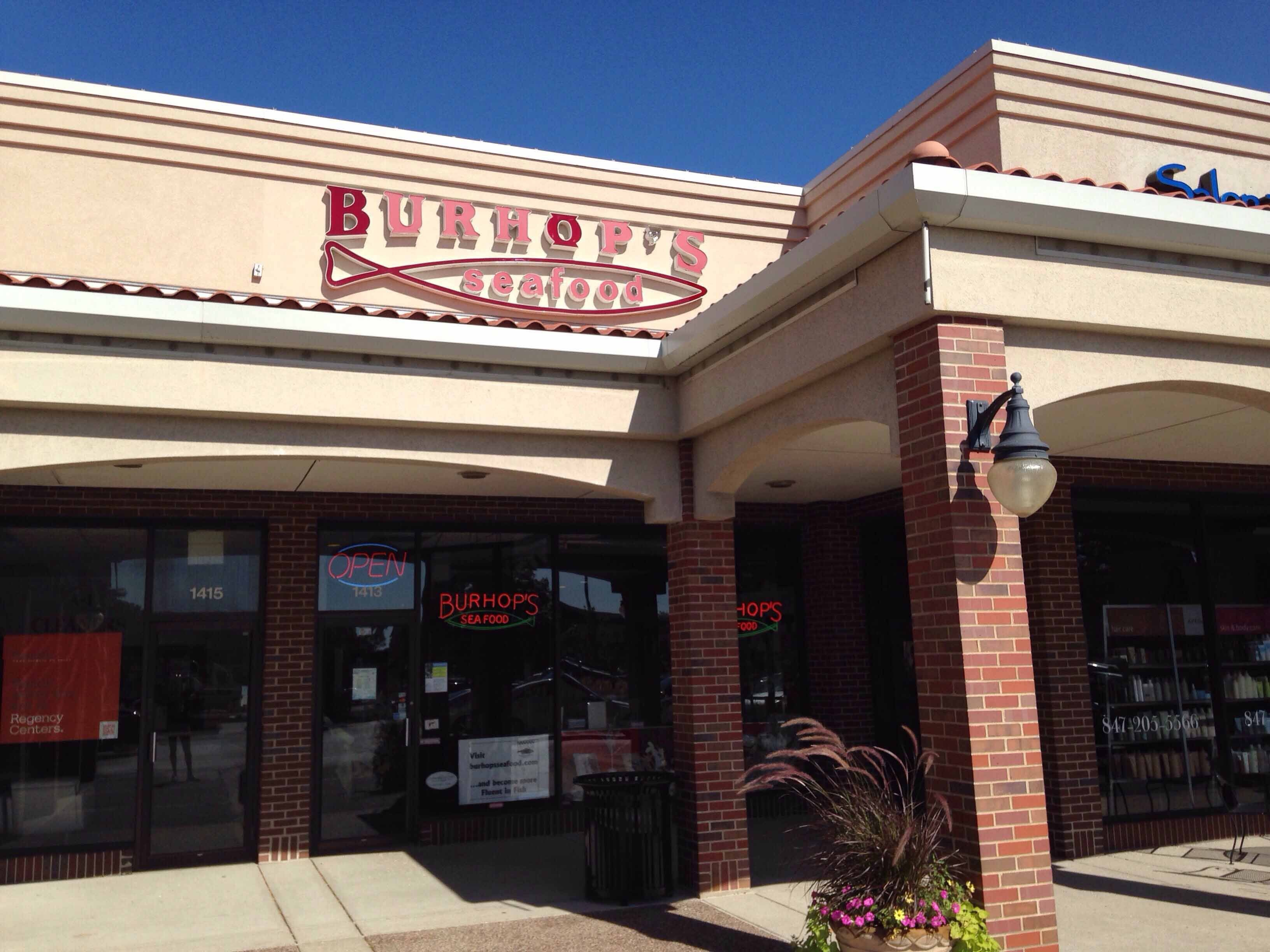
Burhop's Glenview, Illinois location.

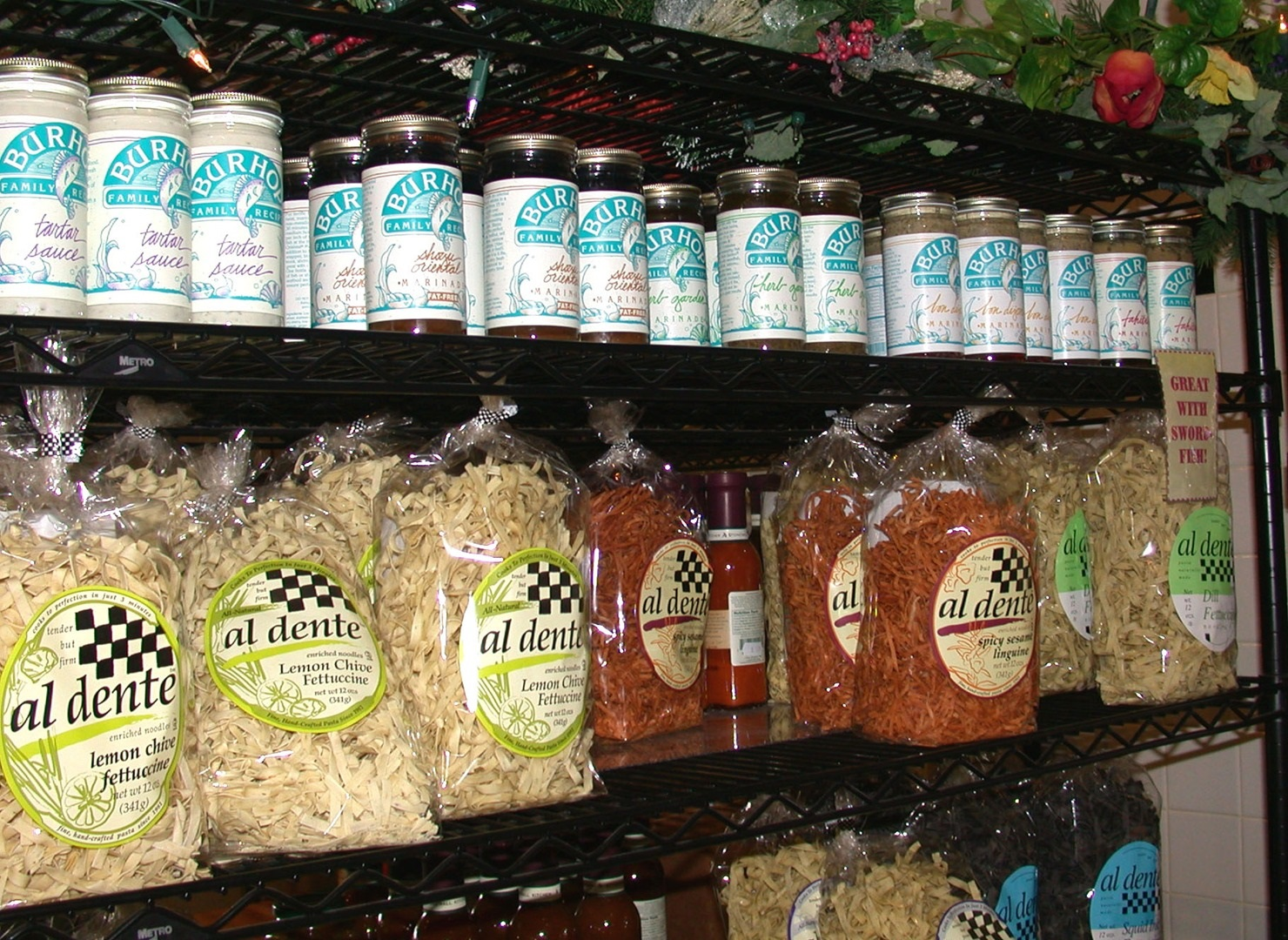
Burhop's marinades and sauces.

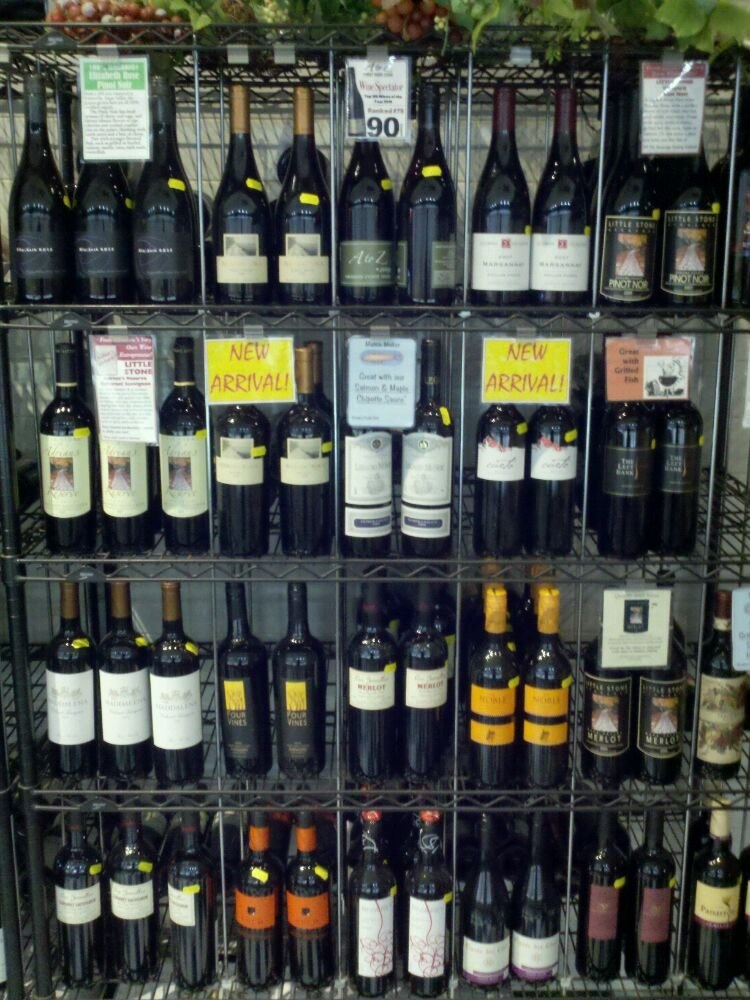
The suburban Burhop's locations also feature small wine boutiques.

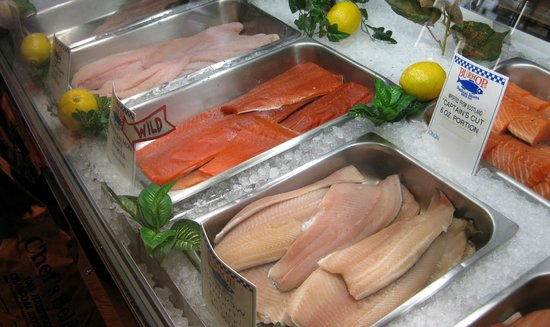
A selection of Burhop's seafood.

At various points in its history Burhop's has been operated as a seafood wholesaler, retailer, and a full-service restaurant, maintaining multiple locations in downtown Chicago (at both North State Street and LaSalle Street) and in five towns in the Chicago metropolitan area (including Glenview, Hinsdale, and Wilmette). As of 2016, retail storefronts are in operation in the latter two locations.

Prior to 1926, perishable seafood was difficult to transport from the East and West coasts to Middle America due to the absence of proper refrigeration techniques. In 1926, Albert E. Burhop partnered with his friend Clarence Birdseye to use the latter's "plate freezer" technology to transport refrigerated fish from New York to Chicago. Burhop's was subsequently founded as a wholesale seafood distribution concern on Chicago's North State Street in late 1926. the Chicago Tribune notes that "Burhop's seemed positively exotic for serving seafood so far inland." By 1933, Burhop's had grown sufficiently in size and notoriety that it was asked to provide seafood for the 1933 World's Fair, whose theme was "A Century of Progress."

Between 1926 and 1979, the company's State Street location was a popular stop for local celebrities such as Abram Nicholas Pritzker, John Patrick Cardinal Cody, Milton Florsheim, William Wrigley III, Gene Siskel, and Mike Royko; several national celebrities, such as James Beard, Julia Child, and Katharine Hepburn, also visited.

Shortly after World War II, Albert Burhop was named to the Fish Advisory Committee of the Department of Agriculture in recognition of his efforts to make quality seafood available to a larger percentage of the U.S. population. The Fish Advisory Committee had been created in 1947 pursuant to the Research and Marketing Act of 1946. In 1955, a second Burhop's location in downtown Chicago, at the corner of LaSalle and Chicago, was opened.

From 1936 to 1981, Burhop's son, Vernon Burhop, was the primary manager of the business. The younger Burhop, described as a "pioneer in the wholesale and retail seafood industry" by the Chicago Tribune, transitioned the wholesaler into the retail seafood industry while expanding the company's operations to seven locations: two in downtown Chicago, and five in the Chicago suburbs. Most notably, in addition to maintaining Burhop's operations on North State Street and LaSalle Street, Burhop opened new locations in Glenview, Wilmette, and, in 1979, Hinsdale.

After Vernon Burhop's retirement in 1981, his sons Jeff and Jim Burhop took over the family business. In 1988, a full-service seafood restaurant operating under the Burhop's name was opened at the company's LaSalle Street location. The same year, a Dear Abby article published in The Milwaukee Sentinel saw Burhop's long-time marketing director, Nancy Burhop, educating the famous advice columnist on both the definition of "fresh" and how to tell fresh and thawed fish apart. As Burhop explained to Pauline Phillips, fresh fish should always smell like cucumbers.

Having closed its two downtown Chicago locations, including Burhop's Restaurant, by 1993, in 1998 Burhop's returned to Chicago, under new management, with a 3,500-square-foot store on North Avenue. The one-time Burhop's Restaurant location on LaSalle Street was in 1993 purchased by a consortium of investors, among them Michael Jordan and Joe and Gene Silverberg, thereafter becoming Michael Jordan's Restaurant.

In the 2000s Burhop's began a delivery service, created fine wine boutiques in its three suburban stores, and, in addition to offering free cooking classes at its locations, began posting viral videos relating to fish preparation on WonderHowTo, YouTube, and other websites. These latter videos were created and directed by Greg Burhop, son of Jeff Burhop and the fourth generation of his family to work for the family business.

Burhop's deals with fish farms certified as sustainable. Among the many types of fish available for sale by Burhop's since the mid-twentieth century are oysters, clams, lobsters, mussels, soft shell crabs, crayfish, yellowfin tuna, barramundi, hake, halibut, mackerel, mahi-mahi, opah, pacific cod, sable, salmon (Keta, King, Silver, and Sockeye), scallop, sole (Lemon, Petrale, and Rock), swordfish, wahoo, striped bass, bluefish, cod, grouper, haddock, monkfish, shrimp, skate, crab claws (Jonah, Stone, and Snow), Northern red snapper, perch, smelts, walleye, freshwater whitefish, trout, tilapia, crab legs (King and Snow), and squid. The company also offers a variety of smoked, cured, frozen, and prepared seafood dishes as well as desserts, wines, and cooking condiments.

== Reviews ==
Chicago Tribune in 2015 identified Burhop's as offering one of the best lobster rolls in the Chicago area, and over the years has lauded the company for the "variety and freshness" of its seafood selection as well as its "knowledgeable staff." Chicago Magazine has recommended Burhop's yellowfin tuna as being among the best in or around the city. A Cook's Guide to Chicago calls Burhop's "one of the first and best seafood stores" in Chicago, while according to Jennifer Olvera of Serious Eats, Burhop's is an "upscale" establishment offering the "freshest of catches" and "eye-catching frozen preparations." Burhop's recipe pamphlets have been selected for inclusion in the Chef Louis Szathmáry Collection of Culinary Arts, currently housed at the University of Iowa in Iowa City.

== Products ==
In continuous operation for the last ninety years, Burhop's is most well known for the following categories of food products, the last two of which are specially developed by the company and sold under its name:

- Live Shellfish
- Fin Fish
- Wild Caught Freshwater Fish
- Frozen Seafood
- Prepared Gourmet Items
- Wine
- Desserts
- Soups
- Sauces
- Marinades
