= Burhoe =

Burhoe is a surname. Notable people with the surname include:

- J. Scott Burhoe (born 1954), United States Coast Guard personnel
- Ralph Wendell Burhoe (1911–1997), American scientist
- Ty Burhoe (born 1964), American tabla player, record company owner, and live concert producer
- Savannah Shay Burhoe (born 1993), part of an American country music duo
- Amanda Quinn Burhoe (born 1995), part of an American country music duo

== See also ==
- Burhop
