= Helen McCully =

Canadian writer (1902–1977)

- Born: Helen W. McCully; September 1902; Amherst, Nova Scotia, Canada
- Died: 24 August 1977 (aged 74); New York City, U.S.
- Occupations: food writer, cookbook author
- Years active: 1929–1977
- Known for: mentoring chefs and serving as food editor of McCall's and House Beautiful magazines.

Helen McCully (1902–1977) was a Canadian food writer, critic and cookbook author from Nova Scotia. She was influential as a food editor of McCall's and House Beautiful and was at least partially responsible for helping to discover the unknown Julia Child in 1960. Besides writing regular columns on food, she used her influence to help promote the careers of many in the food industry, as well as writing her own cookbooks.

== Early life ==
Helen W. McCully was born in September 1902 in Amherst, Nova Scotia, Canada, to Ethel Ellen (née Lowerison) and Herbert Read McCully Her family was quite prominent, including a great-grandfather, Samuel McCully an early minister who helped found the Baptist church in Amherst and his two sons: her grandfather, Robert, a prominent attorney and her great-uncle, Jonathan, a Supreme Court judge and one of the founders of the Canadian Confederation. Her father, Herbert, was a dentist and her mother raised the spirited children in an old Victorian mansion at the outskirts of town.

McCully attended Branksome Hall, a private girls' finishing school in Toronto, matriculating with honors in French in 1921. She then continued her education at Dalhousie University of Halifax, studying arts, and followed up with a secretarial course in 1925 at Miss Conklin's Secretarial School in New York City.

== Career ==
The year after her graduation, McCully became a secretary to Marion V. Langzettel, who directed the Froebel League's school for children in New York City on East 71st Street and within a few years, began working at Andrews, Davis & Platt. (Note: This was probably Anderson, Davis & Platt, a large advertising firm in New York City, as McCully reported she was working in advertising around the same time.) She began her career as an advertising copywriter at Lord & Taylor's in New York City. McCully then became a food editor at Bloomingdale's, where she worked from 1947 to 1960. Afterward, she served as the food editor for McCall's magazine for seven years and then spent ten years as food editor for House Beautiful.

By 1960, McCully had become an icon in the food industry, bringing noted chefs together, serving as a mentor, a contact with peers, and hosting regular culinary salons in her Upper East Side apartment. Though she had a somewhat abrasive manner, McCully was very influential counting among her friends both American and foreign chefs. Helen Evans Brown and James Beard were close friends and colleagues. While running the kitchens for McCall's magazine, she allowed Beard to use the kitchens for his cooking school and helped many chefs gain notice. When Julia Child first envisioned writing articles on French cooking and publishing cookbooks, McCully told her that though the recipes were well constructed, they would seem overwhelming to most cooks. When Child finally agreed that the recipes must be simplified, she still had trouble finding a publisher. McCully read the manuscript for Mastering the Art of French Cooking and gave it to Jacques Pépin, for whom she had become a surrogate mother, telling him she thought it had merit. Pépin had only been in the United States a few months, when he met McCully through Craig Claiborne, the noted food editor of the New York Times and she took him under her wing. Pépin was impressed with Child's manuscript, McCully invited her over to dinner for the two to meet, and a life-long collaboration and partnership emerged.

McCully was interested in making food preparation practical for busy women and, as did most food writers of her time period, advocated for the use of convenience foods. But, she also recommended trying new types of foods, advocating Chinese food, despite the overall xenophobia and anti-communist sentiment common in her era. Besides her editorial work at magazines, she published several cookbooks. Perhaps her best known were Cooking with Helen McCully beside You (1970), which was recommended by the Chicago Tribune, The Other Half of the Egg (1967), written with Pépin and The American Heritage Cookbook (1967), which she edited with Eleanor Noderer, an associate from her days at McCall's. The latter was praised not only for its recipes, but for its inclusion of the history of the development of the food industry in America, which was omitted from later editions of the book. A two-volume set, Nobody Ever Tells You These Things about Food and Drink (1967) and Things You’ve Always Wanted to Know about Food & Drink (1972) gave practical tips, laced with humor, amid the recipes and included conversions from U.S. measurements to metric, translations for cooking definitions from French, as well as buying guides.

McCully strove to make cooking accessible to anyone who wanted to learn the techniques, giving lectures and demonstrations and at one time, even discussed with James Beard the possibility of teaching cooking classes via correspondence course. She also published an autobiographical children's tale about the year that her mother bought her and her siblings a pony for Christmas. The Christmas Pony (1967) was written in collaboration with Dorothy Crayder.

In 1967, McCully, along with Dorothy Drayder, and illustrated by Rober J. Lee published The Christmas Pony with The Bobbs-Merrill Company, Inc. The Christmas Pony was a true story about her Christmas of 1912 when her mother got for her and her two siblings a pony. The book is dedicated to the memory of her parents.

== Death and legacy ==
McCully died on 24 August 1977 at Beth Israel Hospital in Manhattan. Pépin said McCully's legacy was that she "knew everybody in the country who had a passionate interest in food, and she made it her life’s mission to bring us all together, to encourage us, to boost our careers, and when occasion demanded, to scold us like the children she never had".
