= Helen Evans Brown =

American chef and cookbook writer (1904–1964)

- 1961
- Born: Helen Oakley Evans; November 16, 1904; New York City, US
- Died: December 5, 1964 (aged 60); Pasadena, California, US
- Other names: Helen O. Evans, Helen Comstock
- Occupations: Chef, cookbook writer
- Known for: Turning cookbook writing into a scholarly effort
- Notable work: Helen Brown's West Coast Cook Book (1952), Chafing Dish Book (1950)

Helen Evans Brown (1904–1964) was an American chef and cookbook writer. She was a nationally known expert and wrote regular food columns, as well as collecting cookbooks from other authors. She was known as the authority on the west coast food scene of the 1950s and 1960s. She was one of the first chefs to advocate using fresh produce and promoting California cuisine.

== Early life ==
Helen Oakley Evans was born as a twin on November 16, 1904, in Brooklyn, New York, to Lucy Margaretta (née Walker) and Alfred Kinn Evans. She had two younger brothers, John W. and Allen J. Evans, and grew up in Brooklyn, New York. She studied at Connecticut College for Women and Hunter College, before continuing her education at the Yale School of Fine Arts, as an art major in 1924 and 1925. Around 1926, Evans married Stephen Comstock, with whom she had a son, William, and began running a catering business called "The Epicurean" with a friend. Comstock later opened the Brownstone House Restaurant, in New Haven, Connecticut. After around a decade of marriage, in which the couple also had a daughter, she met Phillip S. Brown, who was an uninvited guest at a dinner party Comstock hosted. The two had a whirl-wind courtship and within weeks, Phillip had convinced Comstock to move to California by way of Reno, Nevada. She left her two children with Stephen, married Brown in Nevada and then reunited with her children.

== Career ==
Brown began writing for the Territorial Enterprise in Virginia City as a food editor, soon establishing a name for herself as an expert critic. The couple moved on to Pasadena, California, in 1937, where Brown continued writing for such magazines as House & Garden, Sunset and Woman's Day and worked as a consultant to a Hollywood bakery. Phillip started working in an antique book store, building their collection of cookbooks and served as Brown's taste-tester, research assistant, and typist.

In 1940, Brown began writing articles for "Baltzer’s Bulletin", an upscale grocer's newsletter, and continued to publish the mailer when the Jurgensen's grocery chain bought the original store. That same year, she published articles in Californian Magazine a publication out of Los Angeles, which were collected and printed in paperback and were her first collection of printed works. In 1946, Brown published her first cookbook Some Shrimp Recipes, which was followed by the Chafing Dish Book (1950), which became her best-selling book. Two volumes were published in 1951, Some Oyster Recipes and the Patio Cook Book.

In 1952, Brown published Helen Brown's West Coast Cook Book, which has become a classic regional American cookbook for its well-written and researched choices, as well as her knowledge of a wide variety of cuisines and sense of taste. She transformed cookbook writing into a scholarly endeavor giving bibliographic references, historical context and social significance to her recipes. Brown's push for using local, fresh ingredients, regardless of whether they were available in the grocery store, was revolutionary. She recommended the use of items that grew in people's own back yards, like avocados, cherimoyas, figs, guavas, and loquats, as well as seasonings like cilantro and garlic, which until that time was rarely used, and teriyaki sauce. Brown advocated fusion of cultural dishes into American cuisine and the use of fish which was locally caught. Her vision, laid the foundation of what became known as California cuisine. The publication solidified Brown's reputation among her peers as the authority on the west coast food scene of the 1950s and 1960s and she counted among her many friends, Julia Child, Craig Claiborne, M. F. K. Fisher, Helen McCully and Albert Stockli.

James Beard was so impressed with the book that he wrote Brown, beginning a close relationship that would last until her death. They wrote each other twice a week and became like family, with each visiting the other as often as their busy careers allowed. They forged a partnership without competition, recognizing that while he had more expertise, she had more writing skill, and together pushed each other to make easy-to-prepare foods more palatable. Love and Kisses and a Halo of Truffles (1994) contains some of the correspondence of Beard and Brown, utilizing 300 of the 450 letters from Helen to Jim and his replies. Beard also dedicated his book, American Cookery, to her and in 1955, she and Beard wrote The Complete Book of Outdoor Cookery together.

The Browns were part of a Southern California group which enjoyed casual dining and socializing, with high flair and travel. Well-educated artists, chefs, professionals and scholars, the group were both friends and business allies. Her writing for "Baltzer’s Bulletin" extended into serving as hostess, and at one time a manager, of his grocery store and elite clientele, which included influential personalities like Ingrid Bergman, Buffy Chandler, Alfred Hitchcock and Alfred Knopf. By 1958, Brown had published eleven cookbooks, was heading the cooking department of Sunset magazine, and had written articles for Collier's, the Ladies' Home Journal, McCall's and the Woman’s Home Companion. In 1961, Brown made an extended trip to Europe to research recipes and stories about food and while in Spain began suffering bouts of paralysis. Her husband began taking over her writing for Jurgensen's as her cancer progressed.

== Death and legacy ==
Brown died on December 5, 1964, at her home in Pasadena, California, from a rare kidney disease which had become malignant cancer. Shrimp and Other Shellfish Recipes, a collaboration with her husband, was published posthumously in 1966 and was well received, giving recipes with a gourmet flair, but instructions that were simple to follow with tips for cooking and seasoning shellfish. Although the Browns collected cookbooks from throughout the world (many from France and England), they specialized in American gastronomic literature and had a number of rare and scarce charity cookbooks. The California imprints (their real love) now reside at the Huntington Library in Pasadena. There were over 10,000 volumes in the collection at the time of Brown's death. One of these, Malinda Russell's Domestic Cook Book (1866), the first known cookbook penned by an African-American woman, surfaced in 2000 and was purchased from Pasadena Cookbook seller Janet Jarvits by Jan Longone, curator of the American culinary history collection at the William L. Clements Library of the University of Michigan, Ann Arbor. Some of Brown's publications in "Baltzer’s Bulletin" which were later known as "Jurgensen's Newsletter" were compiled into The Epicurean: Excerpts from "Jurgensen's Newsletter" in 2001 and were published by Weather Bird Press.
