= Abby Fisher =

American cookbook writer

- Born: Abby Clifton c. 1831; Orangeburg, South Carolina, U.S.
- Died: Between 1910 and 1920
- Other name: Abbie Fisher
- Occupations: Cook, author
- Known for: Writing the second cookbook penned by an African-American woman in the U.S.
- Notable work: What Mrs. Fisher Knows About Old Southern Cooking (1881)

Abby Fisher, sometimes spelled as Abbie Fisher (c. 1831 – 1915) was an American former slave from South Carolina who earned her living as a pickle manufacturer in San Francisco and published the second known cookbook by a Black woman in the United States, after Malinda Russell's Domestic Cook Book: Containing a Careful Selection of Useful Receipts for the Kitchen (1866). Abby Fisher's book, What Mrs. Fisher Knows About Old Southern Cooking, was published in 1881 by the Women's Cooperative Printing Office in San Francisco.

== Personal life ==
Abby Clifton was born in Orangeburg, South Carolina to Andrew James, a white farmer, and Abbie Clifton, a slave, in June 1831. Although listed in the US Census as French, her father was more likely an American citizen of French Huguenot origin; in giving her Census account, Abby may have assumed he came from France after hearing him speak French at home. Before the 1860 Census in South Carolina, Abby had moved to Mobile, Alabama. She married Alexander C. Fisher around 1860.

The 1880 Census in San Francisco notes that she was 48 years old during that period, corroborating an 1830 or 1831 birthday. Her race was listed as "Mu.," short for mulatto, or mixed-race. Her occupation is written as "cook", while her husband, Alexander C. Fisher, is "Pickle and Preserve Manfr". She went through a lot of troubles and adversities because she was "mulatto" (mixed) She and her husband had four children living in the household, Benjamin (16), Eliza (12), Jennie (10), and Mary (3), though Abby Fisher's book notes in her "Pap for Infant Diet" recipe that she also had seven other children: "I have given birth to eleven children and raised them all, and nursed them with this diet."

== Career ==
After arriving in San Francisco after 1877 (her daughter Mary was born in Missouri in 1877), Abby Fisher competed in and won several prizes at local fairs, including two medals at the San Francisco Mechanics' Institute Fair in 1880 and a diploma at the Sacramento State Fair in 1879. She made a big impression with high society in San Francisco and was asked to publish a book based on her experiences with Southern cooking. She noted in the "Preface and Apology" of her book that she entrusted the dictation of her cookbook to her friends, including several of San Francisco's elite. This was because she could neither read nor write, having received no schooling. By 1882, she was listed independently from her husband as a pickle manufacturer. (Her husband, meanwhile, worked as a porter). Fisher's business continued to operate through 1890, when it was still listed in Langley's San Francisco City Directory, May 1890, San Francisco, California. By that time, her operations had moved to Noe Valley (436 27th Street).

== Legacy ==
After the 1906 San Francisco earthquake and fire, references to Abby Fisher and her cookbook all but disappeared before a copy of the book resurfaced again at a Sotheby's auction in New York City in 1984. The Arthur and Elizabeth Schlesinger Library at Harvard University purchased the book, and Applewood Books reprinted it the next year, in 1985. At the time, Mrs. Fisher was thought to have written "The First African-American Cookbook," but Malinda Russell's older cookbook was rediscovered in the years following publication.

Culinary historian Karen Hess provided historical notes for a second reprint in 1995.

== See also ==
- Cuisine of the Southern United States
- Soul food
