= ChopChop =

US magazine

- Categories: children's magazine
- Frequency: Quarterly
- Founder: Sally Sampson
- Founded: 2010
- Company: ChopChop Family
- Country: United States
- Based in: Watertown, Massachusetts
- Language: English
- Website: www.chopchopmag.org
- ISSN: 2169-0987

ChopChop: The Fun Cooking Magazine for Families is a quarterly children's magazine published by ChopChop Kids, Inc., a 501(c)(3) nonprofit organization founded in 2010 by cookbook author Sally Sampson. It is based in Watertown, Massachusetts, United States.

The content in ChopChop is designed to teach cooking and nutrition to children for the purpose of combating childhood obesity. Each issue has 12 recipes which are selected as nutritious, ethnically diverse, and inexpensive to make, as well as games, exercises, and food facts.

ChopChop is distributed by subscription in both English and Spanish in seven countries, as well as at pedriatic offices, hospitals, community centers, schools, farmers' markets, and grocery stores. About 500,000 copies of each issue are produced.

== Recognition ==
In 2013, ChopChop received the James Beard Foundation Award for Publication of the Year. ChopChop was also the winner of the 2013 Parents' Choice Magazine Award (gold). The magazine is endorsed by the American Academy of Pediatrics, the Parents' Choice Foundation, and The White House's "Let's Move" campaign.
