= Longone =

Longone may refer to:

- Jan Longone, American food writer and food historian

== Places ==
- Longone al Segrino, small village and comune between Como and Lecco in the province of Como in Lombardy, Italy
- Longone Sabino, comune in the Province of Rieti in Latium, Italy
- Porto Longone, old name of Porto Azzurro
