= What Mrs. Fisher Knows About Old Southern Cooking =

1881 cookbook by former slave Abby Fisher

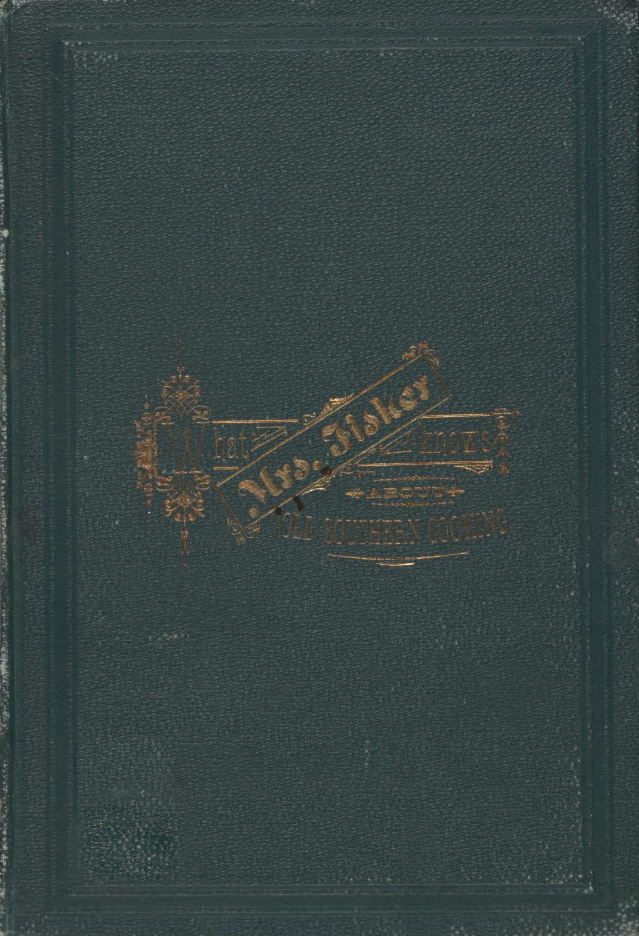
- Book cover
- Author: Abby Fisher
- Genre: Cookbook
- Publication date: 1881
- OCLC: 1370248787
- LC Class: 08023680
- Text: What Mrs. Fisher Knows About Old Southern Cooking at Internet Archive

What Mrs. Fisher Knows About Old Southern Cooking is a cookbook written in 1881 by former slave Abby Fisher, who had moved from Mobile, Alabama, to San Francisco. It was believed to be the first cookbook written by an African-American, before Malinda Russell's Domestic Cook Book: Containing a Careful Selection of Useful Receipts for the Kitchen (1866) was rediscovered.

== Creation ==
Fisher, who could neither read nor write, dictated the recipes. Fisher notes in the foreword to the text: “The book will be found a complete instructor, so that a child can understand it and learn the art of cooking.” She ends the foreword by referencing by name friends from San Francisco and Oakland. The book was published by the Women's Cooperative Printing Office in San Francisco in 1881. The original was a slim volume with a blue leather cover. It is divided into 13 sections according to various categories and contains a total of 160 recipes. A full text of the book can be retrieved at the Library of the University of California.

== Rediscovery ==
The book was unknown, even to food historians, until in 1984 an original volume was purchased by Harvard University's Schlesinger Library at auction from Sotheby's in New York. Karen Hess, a historian on Southern cooking, had heard about the book and attended the auction at Sotheby's. She notes that the cost of the book was "prohibitive" and "she did not have a chance to leaf through it." It was at this time that Hess took a strong interest in getting the book republished. In 1994 Applewood Books located a rare copy and agreed to reprint it with historical notes by Hess.

In preparing her notes, Hess conducted extensive research on Abby Fisher. Hess's research found Abby C. Fisher, aged 48, cook, in the 1880 U.S. census listed at 207-1/2 Second Street, San Francisco. Hess could not find direct records that Fisher was a slave but made the assumption based on Fisher's 1832 birth date and place of birth, South Carolina.

The reprint from AppleWood Publishers is a replica of the original with Preface and Apology, Table of Contents and recipes divided into 13 categories. Hess's Historical Afterword includes information about Mrs. Fisher's life, a section on "African Women Cooks in the Southern Kitchen", notes on "Mrs. Fisher's Culinary Background", and a section on "Transcription of Recipes" among others. The recipes offer an historic look into the culinary practices of plantation cooking and the influence that African American women had on it.

Michigan State University archived the book as a central work of American cookery in their Feeding America: The Historic American Cookbook Project, a collection of 76 historically significant American cookbooks. The project began September 1, 2001 and was completed on August 31, 2003.

== Abby Fisher ==
Abby Fisher was born in 1831. Several sources state that she was born into slavery but this is unverifiable. Karen Hess, the food historian who rediscovered the book and researched its author extensively, could not find any documentation to support this assertion. Abby Fisher worked as a plantation cook in Orangeburg, South Carolina. She moved with her family to San Francisco in 1877 where she taught Southern cooking.

Abby Fisher is listed in the 1880 U.S. Census. Also listed is her husband, Alexander Fisher. The census lists his profession as "pickle and preserves manufacturer", however, the business was under her name, "Mrs. Abby Fisher & Co."

Abby Fisher was awarded two Medals, a bronze for best pickles and sauces, and a silver for best assortment of jellies and preserves at the San Francisco Mechanics' Institute Fair, 1880.

She was awarded a diploma at the Sacramento State Fair in 1879.

== See also ==
- Cuisine of the Southern United States
- Soul food
- Malinda Russell
