= LaSalle Street Cable Car Powerhouse (Chicago) =

Coordinates: 41°53′27″N 87°37′58″W

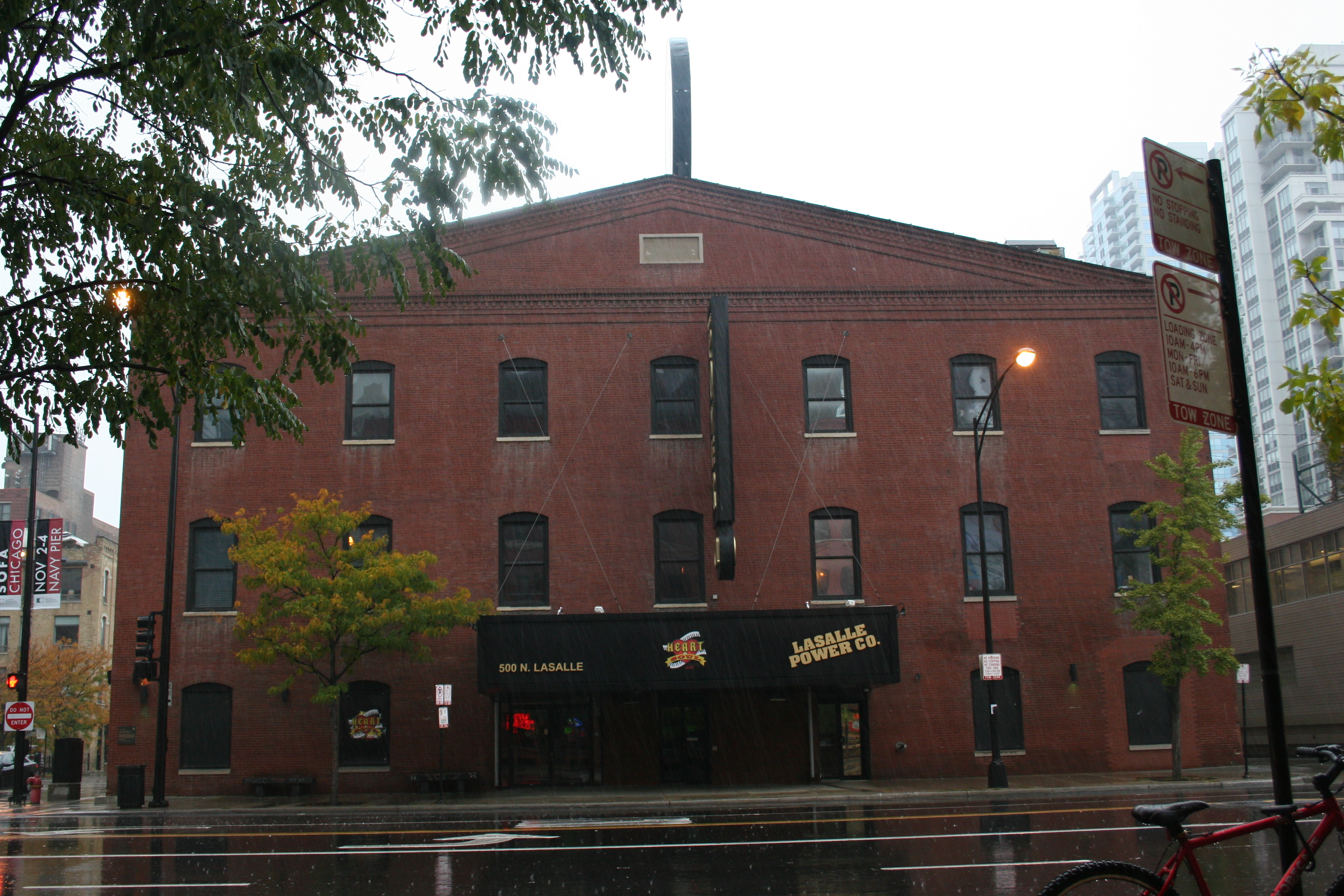
LaSalle Street Cable Car Powerhouse

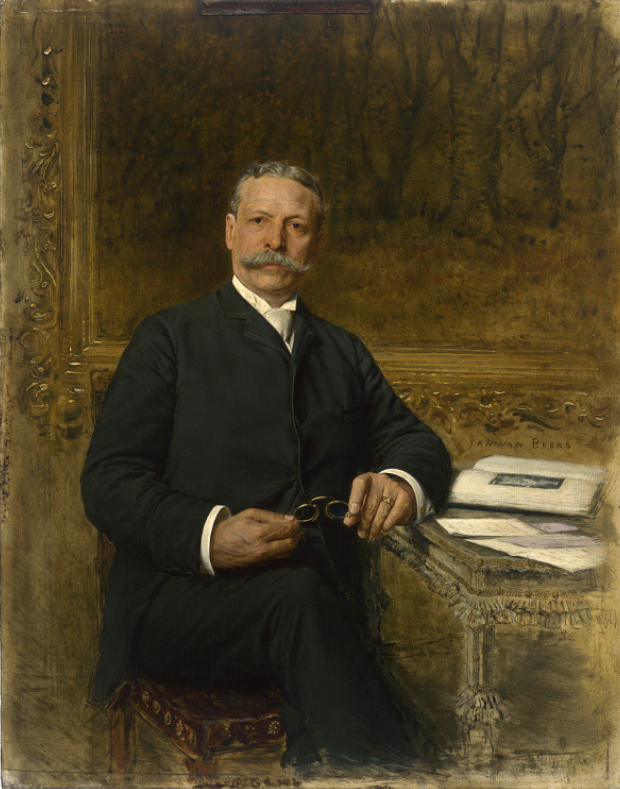
Charles Tyson Yerkes by Jan van Beers

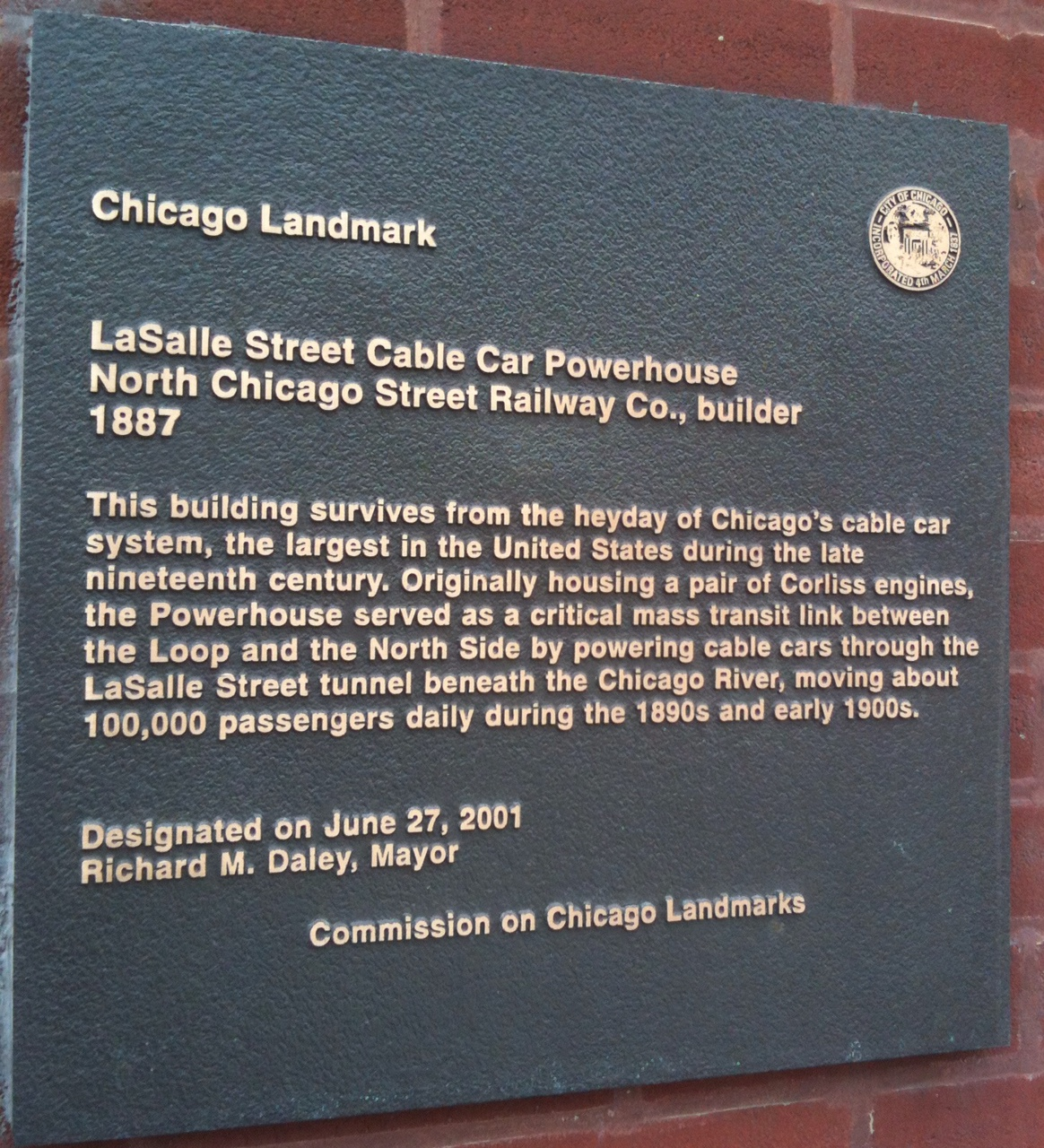
Lasalle Street Cable Car Powerhouse From No. Chicago Street RW Co., 1887 - Chicago Landmark Plaque

The LaSalle Street Cable Car Powerhouse at 500 North LaSalle Street, Chicago, Illinois (northwest corner of LaSalle and Illinois Streets) is a rare surviving artifact of Chicago's cable car system, which at its peak in the 1890s was one of the largest in the country, in terms of riders and equipment. Three separate companies operated thousands of cable cars over 82 miles of track. The three-story powerhouse was built by the North Chicago Street Railroad Company in 1886-1887 for $35,000. "It was a striking presence in the River North area, which was a jumble of low-scale factories, warehouses and shipyards," said a Commission on Chicago Landmarks Designation Report from 2000. The railroad company was organized by Charles Tyson Yerkes, the leading transit entrepreneur in Chicago during the late 19th century. At the height of his influence, Yerkes controlled eight separate street railway companies and 250 miles of track in the city.

Chicago historian Greg Borzo calls the LaSalle Street Cable Car Powerhouse, "the crown jewel of Chicago’s cable car remnants." He also notes, "This powerhouse drove two cables: one that pulled cable cars through a tunnel under the Chicago River along LaSalle Street and around the downtown and another shorter cable that pulled cars along Illinois Street between Clark Street and Wells Street." Those cables, in turn, pulled the thousands of cable cars that, at the peak of their operation, brought approximately 100,000 workers into downtown Chicago each day.

The LaSalle Street Cable Car Powerhouse helped make possible the rapid development of the city's outlying North Side neighborhoods during one of the greatest boom periods in the history of Chicago.

Cable cars operated in Chicago until 1906.

The LaSalle Street Cable Car Powerhouse was designated a Chicago Landmark on June 27, 2001. Today it is a restaurant. It used to be Michael Jordan's Restaurant until 2000. In June 2024, acclaimed British steakhouse Hawksmoor opened their first Chicago location in the space.
