= Malinda Russell =

Cookbook author (ca. 1812 – ?)

- Born: ca. 1812; Washington County, Tennessee
- Died: after 1866
- Occupations: cook, pastry chef
- Years active: 1840–66
- Known for: writing the first cookbook penned by an African-American woman in the U.S.
- Notable work: Domestic Cook Book: Containing a Careful Selection of Useful Receipts for the Kitchen (1866)

Malinda Russell (ca. 1812 – ?) was a free African-American woman from Tennessee who earned her living as a cook and published the first known cookbook by an African-American woman. The book is historically significant, as it shows that African-American Southern cooking was not solely the domain of poverty cooking, but provides evidence of a sophisticated cosmopolitan skill with complex dishes.

== Early life ==
Malinda Russell was born around 1812 in Washington County, Tennessee, and raised in Greene County. Little is known of her childhood, other than that her father Karon was the youngest child of her grandmother and that her mother, also named Malinda Russell, died when Russell was a child. Her mother, Malinda was one of the first group of slaves freed by a man from Virginia named Mr. Noddie.

Russell was literate, a rare attainment for an African American in that period. In the 1830s, when Russell was around 19 years old, she traveled to Virginia with a certificate vouching for her character, written by a Doctor More. Her plan was to go from Lynchburg, Virginia, to Liberia. By the time she arrived, she was penniless, having been robbed by a fellow traveler.

She took employment working for a Lynchburg family as a nurse and traveling companion. A slave woman, Fanny Steward, who had been freed by her Virginia master, taught Russell how to cook, using The Virginia House-wife written by Mary Randolph.

== Career ==
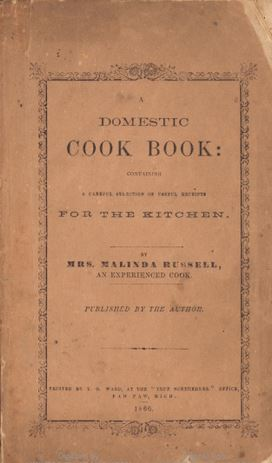
Domestic Cook Book: Containing a Careful Selection of Useful Receipts for the Kitchen 1866

Russell became a cook, predominantly of baked goods. She married Anderson Vaughn while still in Virginia and had a son, who had a disability, with him. Vaughn died four years after and Russell began working as a laundress to support herself and their child.

At some point, she returned to Tennessee and operated a boarding house on Chuckey Mountain near Cold Spring for three years. She then ran a successful pastry shop for around six years.

When her Tennessee home was raided by traveling gangs of whites in 1864, she fled with her son to Paw Paw, Michigan, where she published the first known cookbook by a black woman, Domestic Cook Book: Containing a Careful Selection of Useful Receipts for the Kitchen, as a means to provide income for her and her son and earn money to return to Greeneville, Tennessee. Within months of her publication, the town of Paw Paw was destroyed by fire and further trace of Russell is unknown.

Russell self-published her book, in 1866, giving a brief history of her life and stating in the preface to it that she hoped to earn passage to return home from its proceeds. Most of the recipes were for elegant desserts, like floating island, puff pastry and rose cake, along with main course dishes like catfish fricassee, Irish potatoes with cod, and sweet onion custard, containing none of the soul food traditionally accepted as Southern cuisine. She also provided recipes for ointments and colognes, as well as household tips. The book, containing 265 recipes, was written for people who already knew how to cook, as little instruction for preparation methods is given. Most recipes contain a list of ingredients, though in some cases, a cooking tip is provided.

== Legacy ==
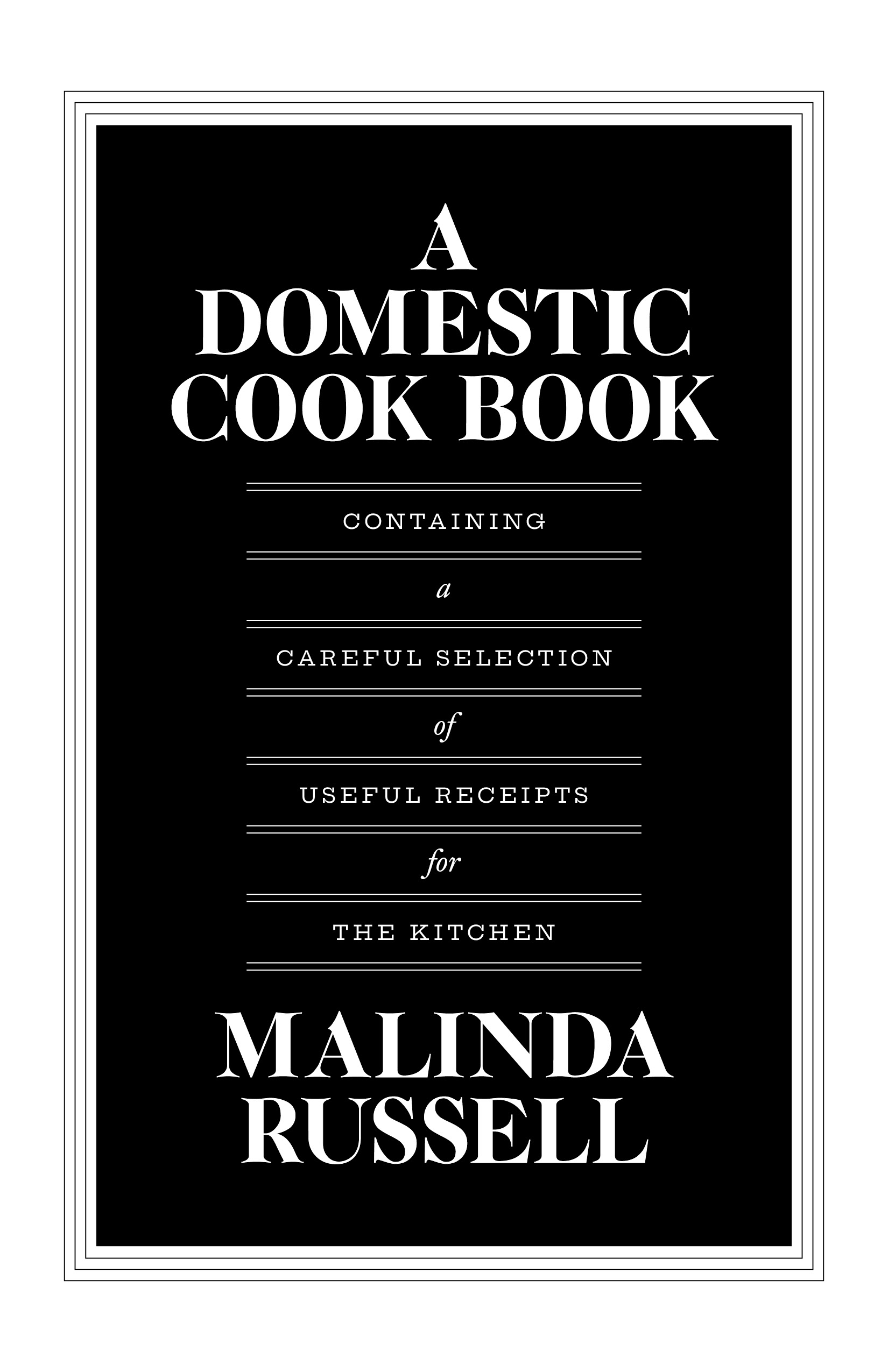
Cover of the 2025 edition of Domestic Cook Book

In 2000, the Domestic Cook Book was purchased by Jan Longone, an antique cookbook collector and curator of American culinary history at the University of Michigan, Ann Arbor's William L. Clements Library from Janet Jarvits, a cookbook dealer who had purchased the book collection of Helen Evans Brown. Longone realized that it was the first known cookbook written by an African American woman and spent the next seven years researching and trying to piece together Russell's history.

Longone published information about the book and what she knew of Russell's life in Gastronomica (2001) and the article attracted attention. In 2007, Longone published a limited-edition facsimile of Russell's cookbook and held a symposium at the Clements Library, where she distributed the copies.

Malinda Russell's A Domestic Cook Book is now held by the University of Michigan Library's Special Collections Research Center as part of the Janice Bluestein Longone Culinary Archive. The University of Michigan Press published a modern edition of A Domestic Cookbook in February 2025.

== See also ==
- Cuisine of the Southern United States
- Soul food
- Abby Fisher
- What Mrs. Fisher Knows About Old Southern Cooking
