= Michael Jordan's Restaurant =

Restaurant and sports bar in Chicago, Illinois, US

Coordinates: 41°53′27.7″N 87°37′58.4″W

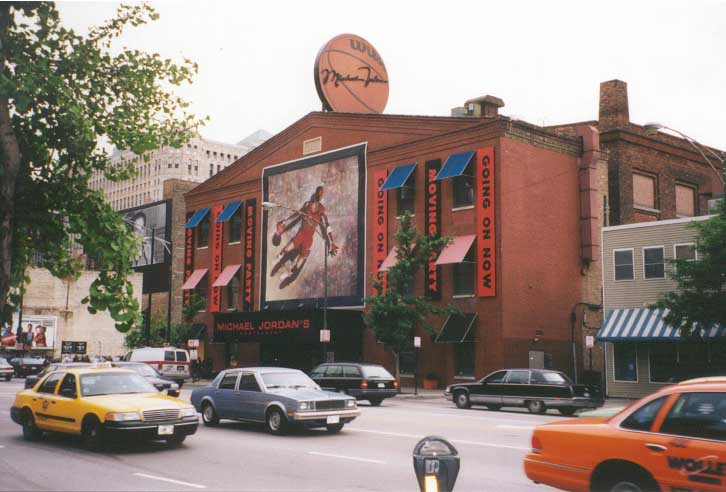
- Interactive map of Michael Jordan's Restaurant

Restaurant information
- Established: 1993
- Closed: 1999
- Location: Chicago, Illinois, United States

Michael Jordan's Restaurant was a multi-level restaurant and sports bar located at 500 N. LaSalle Street in Chicago, Illinois, United States of America. Named after Michael Jordan, a basketball player with the Chicago Bulls, the restaurant was once one of the most popular tourist spots in Chicago. It operated from 1993 until 1999, closing shortly after Jordan's second retirement from basketball.

== Menu and attractions ==
Michael Jordan's Restaurant billed itself as "sporty and casual", with an American menu. Dishes included steak, sole, pasta, hamburgers, ribs, chicken, pork chops, and salads, along with "Juanita's Macaroni and Cheese", which was based on a recipe from Jordan's wife.

The restaurant was housed in a three-story red brick building, which had formerly served as part of a cable car powerhouse. The building was adorned with a 25-foot (7.6 m) high cutout basketball on its roof and a 30-by-30-foot (9.1 by 9.1 m) banner of Michael Jordan. The first floor comprised a 150-person capacity sports bar, a 6-by-20-foot (1.8 by 6.1 m) video wall, and a gift shop that sold a large variety of Jordan merchandise, including licensed apparel and collectibles custom made for the restaurant by companies such as Nike and Wilson Sporting Goods. It also contained a large collection of Michael Jordan memorabilia, such as jerseys, trophies, shoes, photographs, Sports Illustrated magazine covers, and children's drawings of the basketball star. The 200-seat main dining room, which featured a portrait of Jordan by Chicago artist Ed Paschke, was on the second floor. The Jordan family had their own private room on the second floor, and the restaurant staff said that Jordan visited as often as three times a week. The third floor of the building was a meeting and banquet hall. The design firm Zakaspace worked on the restaurant.

Michael Jordan's received mixed reviews from critics. Eleanor Lee Yates of the Fayetteville Observer said the restaurant was "a pleasant surprise", while Sandra Kallio of the Wisconsin State Journal praised it for "excellent food, superb staff and relaxing atmosphere". However, the Chicago Tribune's Phil Vettel described the restaurant as "mediocre".

== History ==
Michael Jordan's Restaurant was the brainchild of Joe and Gene Silverberg, owners of the Bigsby & Kruthers clothing store. They obtained the rights to use Jordan's name in 1990 and spent $6 million developing the restaurant. Jordan himself never had ownership stakes in the restaurant, though he provided input in terms of the decor and the menu. He said he wanted it to be the "kind of place where I can bring my family and friends to eat".

The restaurant opened on April 28, 1993, in the former location of Burhop's Seafood on LaSalle Street in Chicago. Guests at the grand opening included Illinois governor Jim Edgar, Chicago mayor Richard M. Daley, actor Mickey Rooney, and comedian Jackie Mason. During the first few months of operation, the restaurant received up to 1,500 visitors and 7,000 telephone calls each day. Many waited several hours to get a table, since the restaurant did not take dinner reservations. Michael Jordan's remained a popular tourist attraction throughout the 1990s and became a major gathering spot for Chicago Bulls fans during the team's championship runs.

Gene Silverberg said he and his brother began feuding with Jordan in 1996, when Jordan reportedly attempted to change the restaurant from a family-oriented business to a more upscale establishment. In 1997, Jordan opened his own Chicago restaurant, the more formal One Sixtyblue, and generally stopped appearing at the other except for charity events. Jordan's namesake restaurant continued to draw crowds despite his absence, but after Jordan's second retirement in January 1999, the Silverbergs announced that they would remodel the site as Sammy Sosa's Restaurant, a family attraction named after the Chicago Cubs baseball player. They planned to reopen Michael Jordan's Restaurant in a smaller building. In October 1999, Jordan asked a federal judge to terminate his contract with the Silverbergs, explaining that he had not received adequate information about the proposed move. Jordan was also angry that the Silverbergs told the press he was not appearing at their restaurant on a regular basis. He argued that he was never obligated to do so, and that the Silverbergs tarnished his image. The Silverbergs closed the restaurant for good in December 1999, and in June 2000 Jordan won exclusive rights to use his name for restaurants in Chicago. Sammy Sosa's Restaurant never materialized, in part because Sosa did not want to "step on Michael's toes".

Memorabilia from Michael Jordan's Restaurant was auctioned in mid-June 2000. Twenty-six items had once belonged to the Silverbergs' private collection.

== See also ==
- Culture of Chicago
