= Burhop =

Burhop is a surname. Notable people with the surname include:

- Charles Burhop (1882–1952), American socialist, cigarmaker, and saloonkeeper
- Eric Burhop (1911–1980), Australian physicist and humanitarian

== See also ==
- Burhop's Seafood, American company
- Burhou
