= Knock Down Barns =

Tabletop game

- Designers: Greg Burhop
- Publishers: Emerald Den Games
- Players: 2
- Setup time: 1-3 minutes
- Playing time: Variable
- Chance: Medium
- Age range: 10 and up
- Skills: Eye–hand coordination Engineering physics Game theory

Knock Down Barns is a game of physical and mental skill created by Greg Burhop and marketed by Emerald Den Games.

During the game, players take turns flicking a small foam marshmallow at a wooden structure (a "barn") erected by their opponent. The game is won by knocking the pieces of an opponent's barn off the board before the same can be done to one's own structure. The physical layout of the game consists of a handcrafted bamboo board, building materials made of reclaimed barn wood, "weapons" made of white foam, and a burlap sack in which the entirety of the game is stored.

== Kickstarter campaign ==
Knock Down Barns used Kickstarter to raise $5,700 for the project, offering the game and other perks as tiered rewards for contributors. This goal was met and exceeded by raising $14,401 from 262 backers. As of February 2015 none of the backers had received their reward without additional funds or arrangements above and beyond the original promises. The debacle resulted in many problems being brought to light such as the non-existence of any proper business title at the time of the game's inception or Kickstarter funding. Additionally there are still backers as of July 2017 who have yet to receive the backer rewards or refunds with the campaign creator starting lack of funds it means despite clearly selling copies of the game as documented on social media and regardless of many trips and additional personal purchases such as a European vacation.

== Gameplay ==
1. Elevate the board by placing an upright foam "weapon" under each corner.
2. Place the divider across the center line of the board.
3. Each player must use 25 wooden blocks to build a single structure (a "barn") that is taller than the center divider.
4. Each player's barn must meet two additional conditions: all of its constituent blocks must be contiguously touching, and all blocks touching the surface of the board must be supporting the weight of a block placed above them.
5. The first player to complete the construction of his/her barn earns the right to shoot first. Once a player has declared his/her barn complete, no renovations can be made to the structure.
6. Both players must complete the construction of their respective barns before play begins.
7. Remove the divider from the center of the board.
8. The players take turns flicking their foam weapons at one another's barns. Flicked weapons must be in contact with the surface of the board at the moment they are flicked and must be flicked from behind the appropriate line on the playing field (see below).
9. Before a player shoots, he/she may remove from play, without penalty, as many blocks that are completely on his/her side of the center line as he/she wishes. Blocks which are on both sides of the center line are considered "bridges," and may be removed by either player unless there is a block atop the bridge.
10. Players may not alter the position of the blocks in their own barn once play has begun, nor may they move any dislodged blocks on their opponent's side of the center line.
11. If a player accidentally or purposefully alters the position of one of his/her own blocks (a block on his/her side of the center line) before shooting, that block is immediately "sacrificed" and must be removed from the field of play.
12. If an opponent accidentally or purposefully moves one of his/her opponent's blocks (a block not on his/her side of the center line) before his/her barn is shot at, that moved block remains in play and the offending player loses a turn.
13. If an opponent's barn has at least one wall and a roof, it is considered "secure" and may only be shot at from behind the far line on one's own side of the board.
14. If an opponent's barn has at least one floor but no roof, it is considered "roofless" and may only be shot at from behind the center line on one's own side of the board.
15. If an opponent's blocks are all touching the board, the barn in question is considered to be "rubble" and may be shot at from anywhere on one's own side of the board.
16. The game's official instructions request that players shake hands after every match.
17. Definitions: "Secure" (a barn that has at least one block that is totally supported off the surface of the board by another block standing either on its long or short edge); "Roofless" (a barn that has at least one block that is totally supported off the surface of the board by another block lying flat on its side); "Rubble" (a barn with zero blocks supported off the surface of the board)

== Reviews ==
In recommending the game as part of its 2013 Holiday Re-Gifting Guide, The A.V. Club called Knock Down Barns "a mix between Battleship, Jenga, and paper football... it's all strategy and hand-eye coordination." The Chicago Reader gave a similar review in late 2013, describing the game's "build-and-destroy objective" as "Jenga meets Battleship meets dodgeball." The game has also been reviewed and recommended by Thrillist and The Dice Tower.

Knock Down Barns was named a "Favorite Game" by the organizers of the 2014 Chicago Toy & Game Fair.
