= Jan Longone =

American food historian (1933–2022)

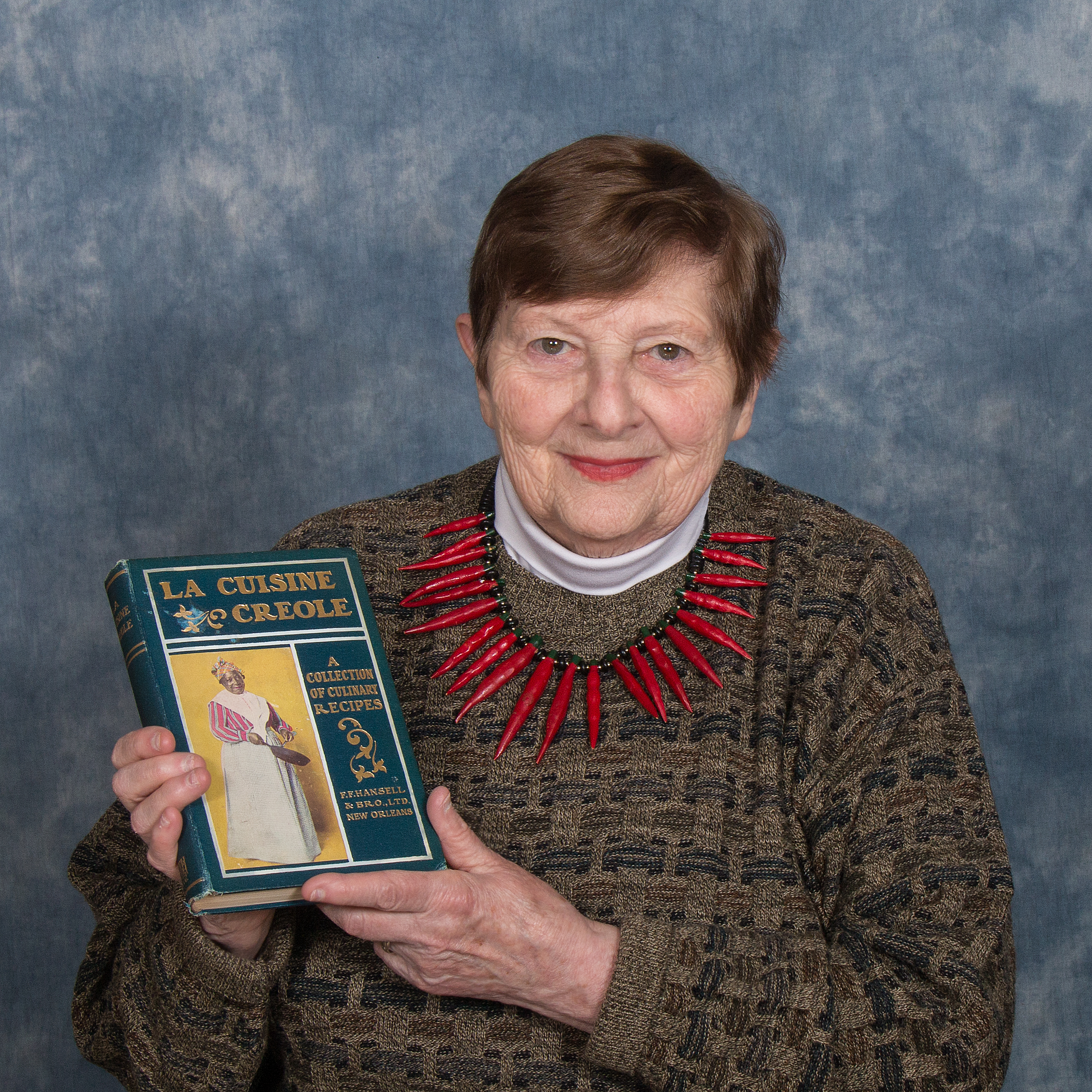
Janice Bluestein Longone: photograph by Conrad Schafer

Janice Longone (née Bluestein; July 31, 1933 – August 3, 2022) was an American food historian, Curator of American Culinary History at Special Collections, Hatcher Library, University of Michigan. Julia Child, James Beard, and New York Times food editor Craig Claiborne were all early fans of Longone's out-of-print cookbook collection. Their enthusiasm prompted her to create The Wine and Food Library in 1972, which offers books by mail order or private appointment and remains one of the most important antiquarian culinary resources in the world.

== Personal life ==
The second of three children, Longone was born to Alexander and Edith Gropman Bluestein, both Eastern European immigrants. She grew up in a six-family tenement house in the Boston neighborhood of Dorchester. Her father was a kitchen equipment salesman, and her mother a homemaker. She recalled lively family dinners when her father would quiz the children over traditional Jewish dishes like gefilte fish and stuffed cabbage rolls.

Longone was the first in her family to attend college, enrolling in Bridgewater State Teacher's College (now Bridgewater State University). She earned a bachelor's degree in history in 1954 and later did graduate work at Cornell University, where she completed coursework toward a Ph.D. in Chinese history.

After graduating from college, Longone married her childhood sweetheart, Daniel T. (Dan) Longone, whom she had met as a teenager during summers spent swimming at Revere Beach near Boston. In 1959 the Longones moved to Ann Arbor, Michigan, where Dan had received an appointment in the University of Michigan's Department of Chemistry. He retired as Professor of Organic Chemistry in 1988.

The couple was active in Democratic Party politics. Jan Longone worked on the congressional campaign of Wes Vivian, one of the so-called “Five Fluke Freshmen” who won congressional seats in the Democratic landslide election of 1964. Longone subsequently became District Representative for Michigan's 2nd congressional district.

== Career ==
When Wes Vivian lost reelection, Longone and her husband began teaching classes on food and wine at the University of Michigan Extension. Their interest in gastronomy had begun soon after they married, when Dan gave Jan a copy of the first Gourmet magazine cookbook. Inside was a coupon for two dollars off a lifetime subscription. As graduate students, the Longones had little money, but they managed to scrape together the forty-eight dollars needed to buy a subscription. Reading Gourmet changed Longone's life. She became passionately interested in recipes and the history and culture behind them. In 2014 Longone revisited the impact Gourmet had on several generations of readers by organizing an exhibition on "The Life and Death of Gourmet—The Magazine of Good Living" at the Hatcher Library at the University of Michigan.

For two years beginning in 1975 Longone hosted a radio show, “Adventures in Gastronomy,” on National Public Radio affiliate WUOM. In 1983 Longone's interest in food history led her to found the Culinary Historians of Ann Arbor, one of the earliest American culinary history groups. She served as its president until 1988 and remained the honorary president. Between 2001 and 2003 she was the major writer and planner of Michigan State University's Feeding America digital cookbook project.

Longone's prodigious research and extraordinary knowledge of American culinary history led to important discoveries, such as Malinda Russell's A Domestic Cookbook, published in 1866 and believed to be the earliest black-authored cookbook in the U.S. Her particular interest in Jewish charity and community cookbooks prompted her to acquire publications from Jewish organizations in every U.S. state.

In 2000 the Longones began donating their extensive culinary archive to the University of Michigan to form the Janice Bluestein Longone Culinary Archive. It consists of more than 30,000 items, including cookbooks, culinary manuscripts, menus, and ephemera, all of which are being cataloged by an army of volunteers. The archive, originally housed at the university's William L. Clements Library, was dedicated in 2005 with a symposium. Since 2013 it has resided in Special Collections at the Harlan Hatcher Graduate Library. Over the years the collection has been the source of numerous exhibitions and symposia, such as "The Iceman Cometh…and Goeth!: The Ice Industry in America" (2004) and "The Second Biennial Symposium: A to Z: An Alphabet of Regional and Ethnic Culinary Traditions" (2007).

Longone was a founding member of the American Institute of Wine & Food (AIWF) and served on its board of directors, as well as on the editorial board of Gastronomica: The Journal of Food and Culture, to which she also contributed a column, “Notes on Vintage Volumes.” She is the author of entries on American cookbook history for The Oxford Companion to Food and was an associate editor for The Oxford Encyclopedia of Food and Drink in America. Longone served as a judge for many cookbook awards, including those sponsored by the AIWF, the International Association of Culinary Professionals (IACP), the James Beard Foundation, and the McIlhenny Company, which for 20 years sponsored the Tabasco Community Cookbook Awards. She was active in organizing a chapter of Les Dames d’Escoffier in Ann Arbor.

== Awards ==
In June 2000 Longone received the Food Arts Silver Spoon Award for her work in uncovering and preserving American culinary history. In 2011 the Culinary Historians of New York honored her with the Amelia Award for lifetime achievement in culinary history.
