= Applewood Books =

Publisher

- Founded: 1976
- Founder: Phil Zuckerman
- Country of origin: United States
- Headquarters location: Carlisle, Massachusetts
- Distribution: Ingram Publisher Services
- Official website: arcadiapublishing.com

Applewood Books is a publishing company which specializes in reissuing original versions of historical books, founded by Phil Zuckerman in 1976.

Its popular reprints include a hardcover edition of the Constitution of the United States; Robert L. May's Rudolph the Red-Nosed Reindeer; What Mrs. Fisher Knows About Old Southern Cooking, a 1881 cookbook by a former African-American slave; and the first three Nancy Drew and Hardy Boys original editions, aimed at adult fans who grew up reading the originals and disliked the modernised versions.

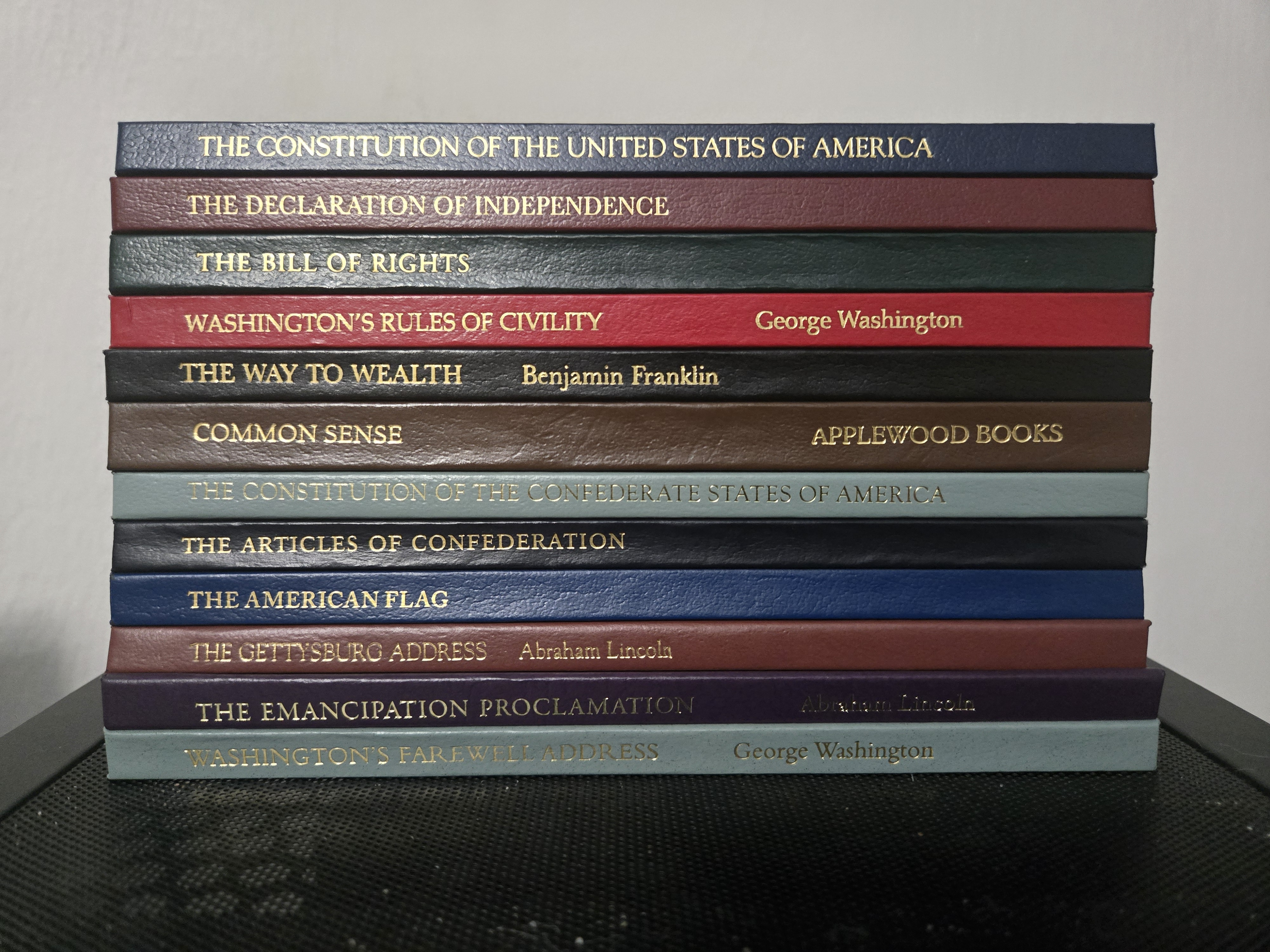
Various books published by Applewood

In November 1998, Applewood began offering yearlong subscriptions to reprinted editions of Harper's Weekly sent in digital or physical format, targeted at "Civil War buffs" and readers interested in following history in the present tense. The subscriptions began with the 1860 presidential election edition, and were planned to continue at least until the 1865 editions.

Around October 2009, Applewood Books began distributing for Commonwealth Editions, another publisher from Massachusetts, which typically published adult and children's non-fiction with historical themes. Applewood acquired the company in August 2010; Zuckerman said Commonwealth would endure as a "separate imprint". Applewood sold Commonwealth Editions to Arcadia Publishing in 2021.

In April 2023, it was announced that Arcadia Publishing had purchased Applewood Books.
