= Savvy & Mandy =

Musical duo

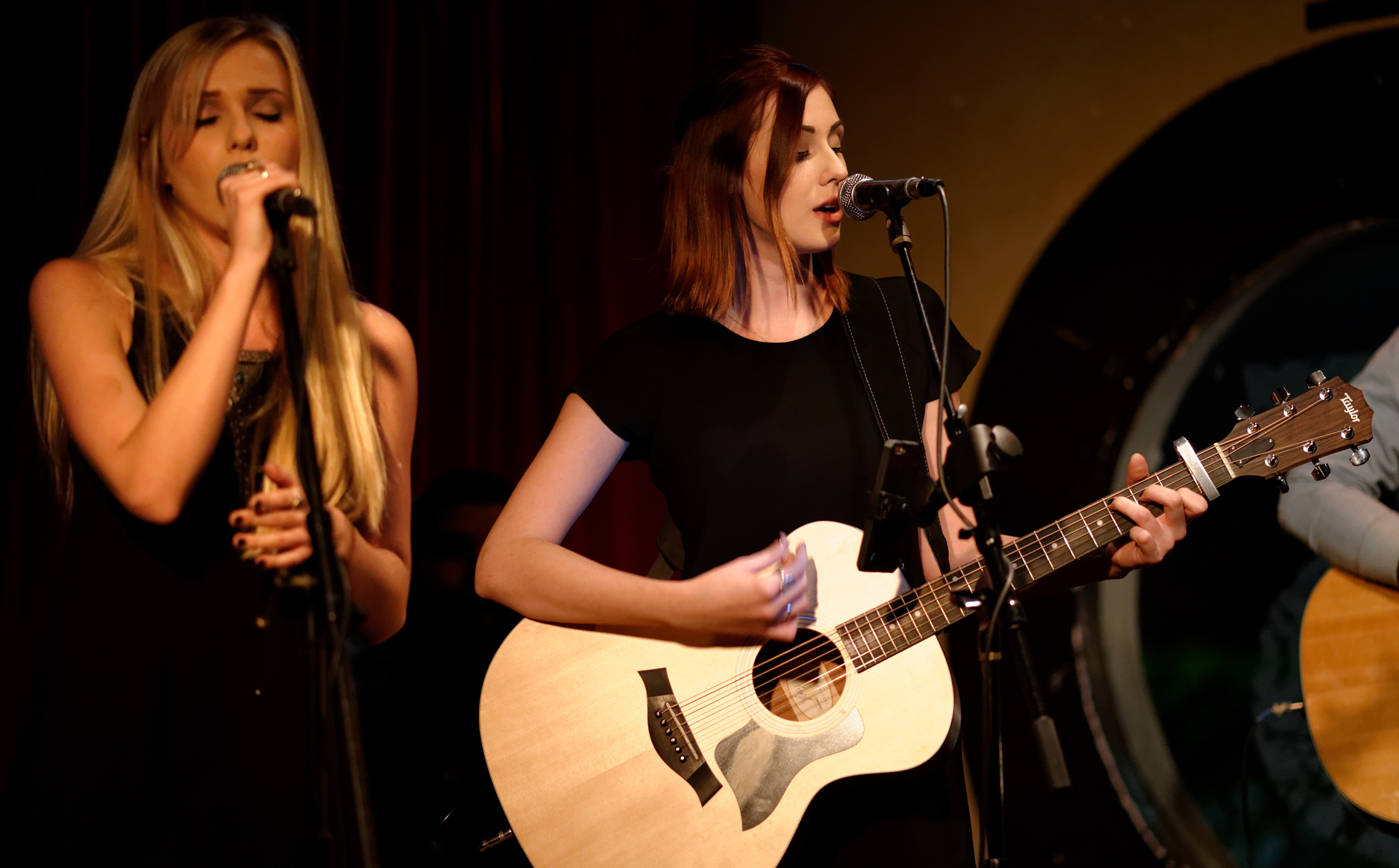

Background information
- Genres: Country pop
- Years active: 2007 - Present
- Labels: Unsigned
- Members: Savannah Burhoe and Amanda Burhoe
- Website: www.savvyandmandy.com

Savvy & Mandy is a country-pop duo from Southern California in the United States. Savvy and Mandy are sisters, Savannah Shay Burhoe (born August 10, 1993) and Amanda Quinn Burhoe (born October 12, 1995). The Burhoe sisters professional career began with acting and modeling at the ages of 9 and 11.

== Background ==
The Burhoe sisters began singing together as children and formed the duo Savvy & Mandy after they both learned to play guitar. They began recording their debut release on the Firm Music label in 2007 with The Collective (T-Squad) and Ken Hauptmann as well as Colleen Fitzpatrick (Vitamin C). In October 2007 they released a digital-only EP entitled Christmas in California which was featured on the ym.com website's What’s Hot This Week on November 6, 2007

"Waiting for the Heartbreak", their debut single, was featured on the MTV series Newport Harbor: The Real Orange County, episode 201, "Are We or Aren't We". It won Radio Disney's Music Mailbag on January 19, 2008, earning them online and regional airplay on Radio Disney stations. The song also received airplay on AOL Radio's Kid station. They performed at the International Family Film festival on March 2, 2008, in Hollywood, Los Angeles, California.

The Burhoes are part of the Milkrocks program to bring music to children in school in the United States through milk cartons.

== Discography ==
=== EP ===
- 2007: Christmas in California
- 2008: Here We Are

=== Singles ===
- 2008: "Waiting For The Heartbreak"
- 2008: "Here I Am"
- 2009: "This Is Me"
- 2010: "Favorite Song"
- 2010: "Words"
- 2010: "Save Me" (Produced by: Manny Streetz of Silent String Entertainment and Eddie Galan & Alex Niceforo of Mach 1 Music)
- 2011: "Rumors"
- 2018: "Do You Lie Awake At Night"

=== Other songs ===
- 2008: "What You See Is What You Get"
- 2009: "Shell Shocked"
- "Heart Broken" duets album
