= Bigsby & Kruthers =

Men's clothier in Chicago, U.S.

- Type: Private
- Industry: Retail
- Founded: 1970
- Founder: Joe Silverberg
- Defunct: 2000
- Headquarters: Chicago, Illinois, U.S.A.
- Key people: Gene Silverberg
- Products: Clothing

Bigsby & Kruthers was a high-profile men's clothier in Chicago for 30 years from 1970 to 2000. The privately held company was founded by Joe Silverberg, joined shortly thereafter by his brother, H. Gene Silverberg, who both got their start as children working on Maxwell Street.

== Locations ==
The chain started as a small jeans and menswear surplus store on Broadway and Briar St., and at its peak there were upscale suit stores in prime locations on the Magnificent Mile, Lincoln Park (1750 N. Clark Street), Water Tower Place, 10 S. LaSalle Street, Oakbrook Center, and Northbrook Court (with a focus on women's wear). Other locations had opened and closed (or moved), including Diversey Pkwy. near Clark St., Woodfield Mall, Brickyard Mall, an outlet store in Gurnee Mills, a Dallas, Texas store that opened in 1986, and a franchise in Madison, Wisconsin.

The image Bigsby & Kruthers portrayed was more European tailored and fashion-forward than more traditional competitors, such as Paul Stuart.

== Recognition ==
In addition to their fashion and service, the chain was recognized for innovative and award-winning store design (including large tie walls), marketing, and celebrity affiliation. Advertising included a widely reported traffic stopping multi-sided mural on their warehouse building along the Kennedy Expressway, a series of "Suit Books" containing Chicago celebrity photo portraits, radio, television, other print and billboards. Bigsby & Kruthers was also known for its Chicago celebrity clients, including major sports figures (notably Michael Jordan, Dennis Rodman, Phil Jackson, Frank Thomas, Sammy Sosa, and Chicago Bears), newscasters, politicians, actors, and CEO's.

B&K received national and international attention and was the subject of numerous articles in publications such as Esquire, The Wall Street Journal, Business Week, Forbes, The New York Times, and GQ. Esquire Magazine named Bigsby and Kruthers one of the top ten specialty retailers in the United States. The Silverbergs appeared on national and local television programs such as NBC's The Today Show. In popular culture, a faux Bigsby & Kruthers storefront is visible in the mall car chase scene in The Blues Brothers.

In 1989 B&K launched Knot Shop (originally "Knot Krazy"), a now defunct national chain of 35 tie stores that also sold scarves and boxer shorts, and that employed Monica Lewinsky before she became a White House intern. The company was also involved in Bigsby's Bar & Grill, Michael Jordan's Restaurant, and various licensing deals.

The closing of the chain was largely attributed to the trend in casual dressing that also forced the closing of many of its competitors, and the fact that B&K had always been highly leveraged.
