= James Beard =

American chef (1903–1985)

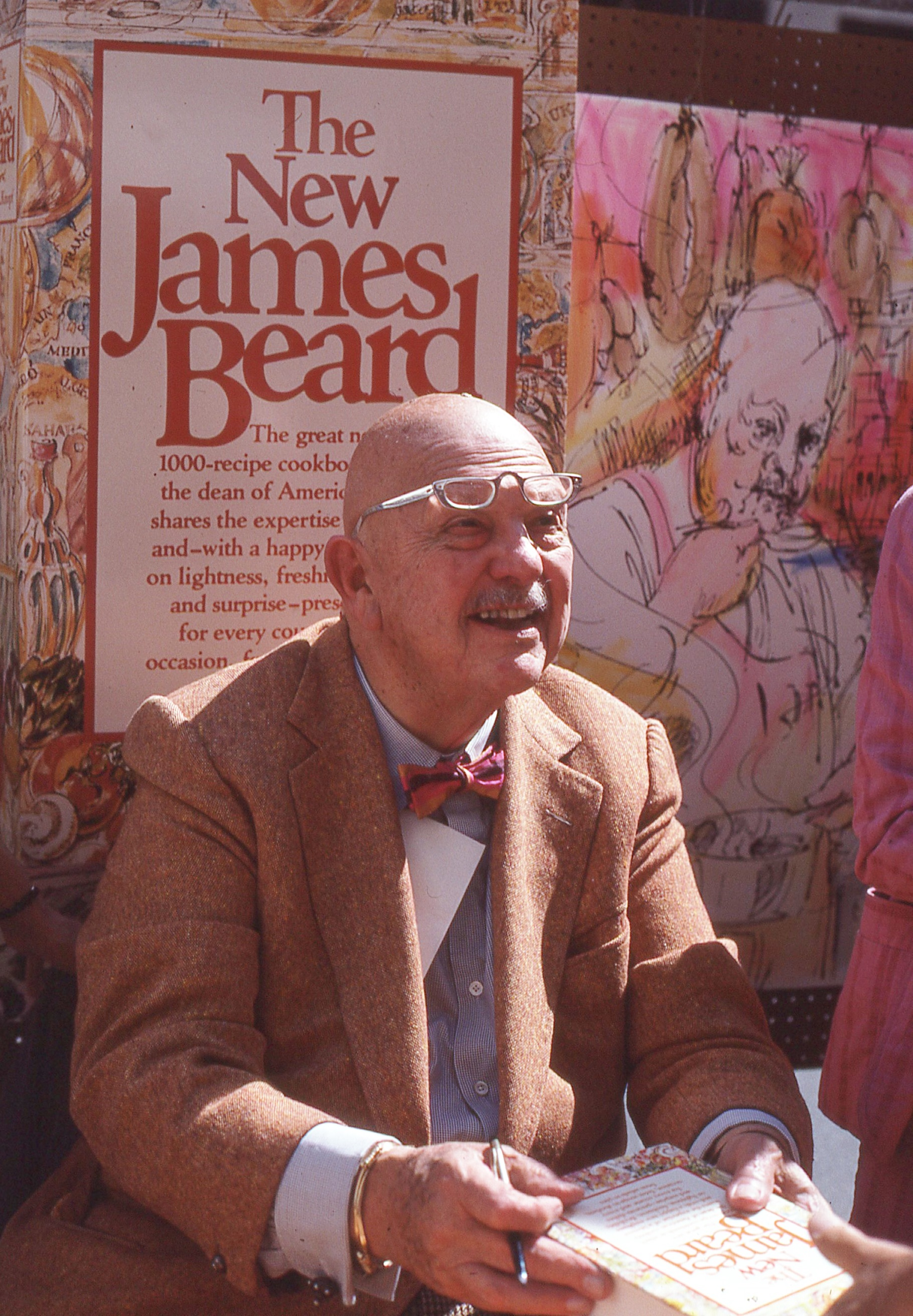
- Beard signing books at a street fair in Manhattan in 1981
- Born: James Andrews Beard; May 5, 1903; Portland, Oregon, US
- Died: January 21, 1985 (aged 81); New York City, US
- Culinary career
- Cooking style: American; French; Chinese
- Website: jamesbeard.org

James Andrews Beard (May 5, 1903 – January 21, 1985) was an American chef, cookbook author, teacher and television personality. He pioneered television cooking shows, taught at The James Beard Cooking School in New York City and Seaside, Oregon, and lectured widely. He emphasized American cooking, prepared with fresh and wholesome American ingredients, to a country just becoming aware of its own culinary heritage. Beard taught and mentored generations of professional chefs and food enthusiasts. He published more than twenty books, and his memory is honored by his foundation's annual James Beard Awards.

== Early life and education ==
=== Family ===
James Andrews Beard was born in Portland, Oregon, on May 5, 1903, to Elizabeth and John Beard. His British-born mother operated the Gladstone Hotel, and his father worked at the city's customs house. The family vacationed on the Pacific coast in Gearhart, Oregon.

Beard's earliest memory of food was at the 1905 Lewis and Clark Exposition, when he was two years old. In his memoir he recalled:

I was taken to the exposition two or three times. The thing that remained in my mind above all others—I think it marked my life—was watching Triscuits and shredded wheat biscuits being made. Isn't that crazy? At two years old that memory was made. It intrigued the hell out of me.

At age three Beard was bedridden with malaria, and the illness gave him time to focus on the food prepared by his mother and Jue-Let, the family's Chinese cook. According to Beard he was raised by Jue-Let and Thema, his Chinese nanny, who instilled in him a passion for Chinese culture. Beard reportedly "[attributed] much of his upbringing to Jue-Let", whom he referred to as his Chinese godfather.

=== Education ===
Beard graduated from Portland's Washington High School in 1920. In the same year, he began study at Reed College in Portland, Oregon. He was expelled in 1922, having had relationships with "one or more male students and a professor." The college granted Beard an honorary degree in 1976. After his death in 1985, James bequeathed the bulk of his estate to Reed, including his private collection of his own cookbooks, and set up the James Beard Scholarship Fund, which supports students who otherwise could not afford tuition.

After leaving Reed, he traveled from Portland to Liverpool aboard a British freighter, spending subsequent years living and traveling in Europe. In 1923, he joined a theatrical troupe and studied voice and theater. He also spent time in Paris, where he experienced French cuisine at its bistros and central market, Les Halles. In France, he also had the opportunity to enjoy sexual freedom, having a short relationship with a young man. From this period and the widespread influence of French food culture, he became a Francophile. In 1927 he returned to the US, spending time in Portland, Hollywood, and New York attempting to start a career in acting, costume and set design, and radio.

== Career ==
Beard moved to New York City in 1937. Unlucky in the theater, he and friend Bill Rhodes capitalized on the cocktail party craze by opening Hors d'Oeuvre, Inc., a catering company. This led to lecturing, teaching, writing, and the realization "that part of his mission [as a food connoisseur] was to defend the pleasure of real cooking and fresh ingredients against the assault of the Jell-O-mold people and the domestic scientists." He published his first cookbook in 1940: Hors D'Oeuvre and Canapés, a compilation of his catering recipes. According to fellow cooking enthusiast Julia Child, this book put him on the culinary map.

World War II rationing ended Beard's catering business. He enlisted in the Army and was trained as a cryptographic specialist. Because he had hoped to serve in the hotel management division of the Army Quartermaster Corps, he sought and obtained release from the Army in 1943 based on a regulation applying to men over age 38.

From August 1946 to May 1947, he hosted I Love to Eat, a live television cooking show on NBC, beginning his ascent as an American food authority.

In 1952, when Helen Evans Brown published her Helen Brown's West Coast Cook Book, Beard wrote her a letter igniting a friendship that lasted until Brown's death. The two, along with her husband Phillip, developed a friendship which was both professional and personal. Beard and Brown became like siblings, admonishing and encouraging each other, as well as collaborating. According to the James Beard Foundation website, "In 1955, he established The James Beard Cooking School. He continued to teach cooking to men and women for the next thirty years, both at his own schools (in New York City and Seaside, Oregon), and around the country at women's clubs, other cooking schools, and civic groups. He was a tireless traveler, bringing his message of good food, honestly prepared with fresh, wholesome, American ingredients, to a country just becoming aware of its own culinary heritage." Beard brought French cooking to the American middle and upper classes during the 1950s, appearing on TV as a cooking personality. David Kamp (who discusses Beard at length in his book, The United States of Arugula) noted that Beard's was the first cooking show on TV. He compares Dione Lucas' cooking show and school with Beard's, noting that their prominence during the 1950s marked the emergence of a sophisticated, New York-based, nationally and internationally known food culture. Kamp wrote, "It was in this decade [the 1950s] that Beard made his name as James Beard, the brand name, the face and belly of American gastronomy." He noted that Beard met Alice B. Toklas on a trip to Paris, indicative of the network of fellow food celebrities who would follow him during his life and carry on his legacy after his death.

Beard made endorsement deals to promote products that he might not have otherwise used or suggested in his own cuisine, including Omaha Steaks, French's Mustard, Green Giant Corn Niblets, Old Crow bourbon, Planters Peanuts, Shasta soft drinks, DuPont chemicals, and Adolph's Meat Tenderizer. According to Kamp, Beard later felt himself a "gastronomic whore" for doing so. Although he felt that mass-produced food that was neither fresh, local nor seasonal was a betrayal of his gastronomic beliefs, he needed the money for his cooking schools. According to Thomas McNamee, "Beard, a man of stupendous appetites—for food, sex, money, you name it—stunned his subtler colleagues." In 1981, Beard and friend Gael Greene founded Citymeals-on-Wheels, which continues to help feed the homebound elderly in New York City.

== Personal life ==
Beard was gay. According to Beard's memoir, "By the time I was seven, I knew that I was gay. I think it's time to talk about that now." Beard came out in 1981, in Delights and Prejudices, a revised version of his memoir. Of Beard's "most significant romantic attachments" was his "lifetime companion" of thirty years, Gino Cofacci, who was given an apartment in Beard's townhouse in the will and died in 1989, and Beard's former cooking school assistant Carl Jerome. John Birdsall, a food writer who won two James Beard Awards, ties Beard's sexuality to his food aesthetics, and said in 2016 it was only recently that people are accepting the connection.

== Death ==
James Beard died of heart failure on January 21, 1985, at his home in New York City at age 81. He was cremated and his ashes scattered over the beach in Gearhart, Oregon, where he spent summers as a child.

In 1995, Love and Kisses and a Halo of Truffles: Letters from Helen Evans Brown was published. It contained excerpts from Beard's bi-weekly correspondence from 1952 to 1964 with friend and fellow chef Helen Evans Brown. The book gave insight to their relationship as well as the way that they developed ideas for recipes, projects and food.

== Foundation ==
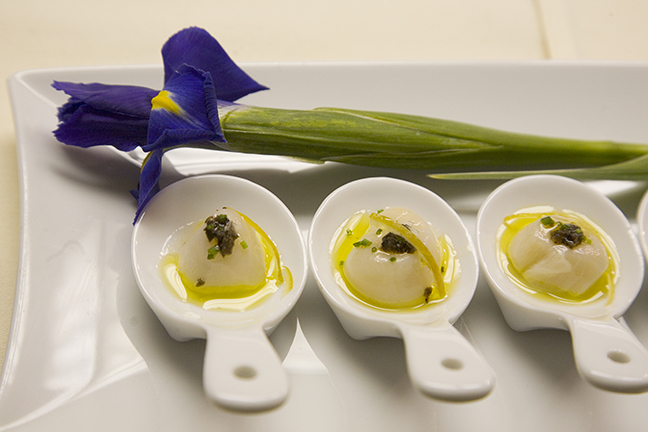
Hors d'oeuvres at the James Beard House, January 2007

After Beard's death in 1985, Julia Child wanted to preserve his home in New York City as the gathering place that it had been during his life. Peter Kump, a former student of Beard's and the founder of the Institute of Culinary Education (formerly Peter Kump's New York Cooking School), spearheaded efforts to purchase the house and create the James Beard Foundation. Beard's renovated brownstone at 167 West 12th Street in Greenwich Village, is North America's only historic culinary center. It is preserved as a gathering place where the press and general public could appreciate the talents of emerging and established chefs.

In 1986, the James Beard Foundation was established in Beard's honor to provide scholarships to aspiring food professionals and champion the American culinary tradition which Beard helped create. "Since its inception in 1991, the James Beard Foundation Scholarship Program has awarded over $4.6 million in financial aid to a variety of students—from recent high school graduates, to working culinary professionals, to career changers. Recipients come from many countries, and enhance their knowledge at schools around the world."

The annual James Beard Foundation Award celebrate fine cuisine around Beard's birthday. Held on the first Monday in May, the awards ceremony honors American chefs, restaurants, journalists, cookbook authors, restaurant designers and electronic-media professionals. It culminates in a reception featuring tastings of signature dishes of more than 30 of the foundation's chefs. A quarterly magazine, Beard House, is a compendium of culinary journalism.

The foundation was affected by scandals; in 2004 its head, Leonard Pickell, resigned and was imprisoned for grand larceny and in 2005 the board of trustees resigned. During this period, chef and writer Anthony Bourdain called the foundation "a kind of benevolent shakedown operation." A new board of trustees instituted an ethics policy and chose a new president, Susan Ungaro, to prevent future problems.

== Works ==
- Hors d'Oeuvre and Canapés (1940) M. Barrows & Co., revised in 1963 and 1985
- Cook It Outdoors (1941) M. Barrows & Co.
- Fowl and Game Cookery (1944) M. Barrows & Co.
- The Fireside Cook Book: A Complete Guide to Fine Cooking for Beginner and Expert (1949) Simon & Schuster, reissued in 1982 as The Fireside Cookbook
- Paris Cuisine (1952) Little, Brown and Company Beard co-wrote Paris Cuisine with British journalist Alexander Watt.
- The Complete Book of Barbecue & Rotisserie Cooking (1954) Maco Magazine Corp., reissued in 1958 as New Barbecue Cookbook and again in 1966 as Jim Beard's Barbecue Cookbook
- Complete Cookbook for Entertaining (1954) Maco Magazine org
- How to Eat Better for Less Money (1954) Simon & Schuster
- James Beard's Fish Cookery (1954) Little, Brown, reissued in 1976 and 1987 in paperback as James Beard's New Fish Cookery
- Casserole Cookbook (1955) Maco Magazine Corp.
- The Complete Book of Outdoor Cookery (1955) Doubleday
- The James Beard Cookbook (1959) Dell Publishing, revised in 1961, 1970, 1987 (paperback) and 1996
- Treasury of Outdoor Cooking (1960) Golden Press
- Delights & Prejudices: A Memoir with Recipes (1964) Atheneum, revised in 1981 and 1990
- James Beard's Menus for Entertaining (1965) Delacorte Press
- How to Eat (and Drink) Your Way through a French (or Italian) Menu (1971) Atheneum
- James Beard's American Cookery (1972) Little, Brown and Company
- Beard on Bread (1973) Alfred A. Knopf, revised in 1995 (paperback)
- James Beard Cooks with Corning (1973)
- Beard on Food (1974) Knopf
- New Recipes for the Cuisinart Food Processor (1976)
- James Beard's Theory & Practice of Good Cooking (1977) Knopf, revised in 1978, 1986, and 1990
- The New James Beard (1981) Knopf, revised in 1989
- Beard on Pasta (1983) Knopf
- The Grand Grand Marnier Cookbook, with John Chang McCurdy (1982) TBWA Advertising, Inc., New York OCLC 25716217
- Benson & Hedges 100's presents 100 of the world's greatest recipes (1976) Philip Morris Inc., New York OCLC 5867311
- The James Beard Cookbook on CuisineVu (1987) A computer diskette with about 125 recipes from The James Beard Cookbook (unpublished)
- James Beard's Simple Foods (1993) Macmillan ISBN 978-0-02508-070-6
- Love and Kisses and a Halo of Truffles (1994) Arcade, edited by John Ferrone ISBN 978-1-55970-264-5
- The James Beard Cookbooks (1997) Thames and Hudson, edited by John Ferrone
- The Armchair James Beard (1999) The Lyons Press, edited by John Ferrone ISBN 978-1-55821-737-9
- The Essential James Beard Cookbook (2012) St. Martin's Press ISBN 978-0-31264-218-1

=== Archival collection ===
The James Beard Papers are housed in the Fales Library at New York University.

== See also ==
- Culinary history of New York City
- LGBTQ culture in New York City
- List of LGBT people from New York City
- List of LGBT people from Portland, Oregon
- NYC Pride March
