= Shrimp and grits =

American dish in the Carolinas and Georgia

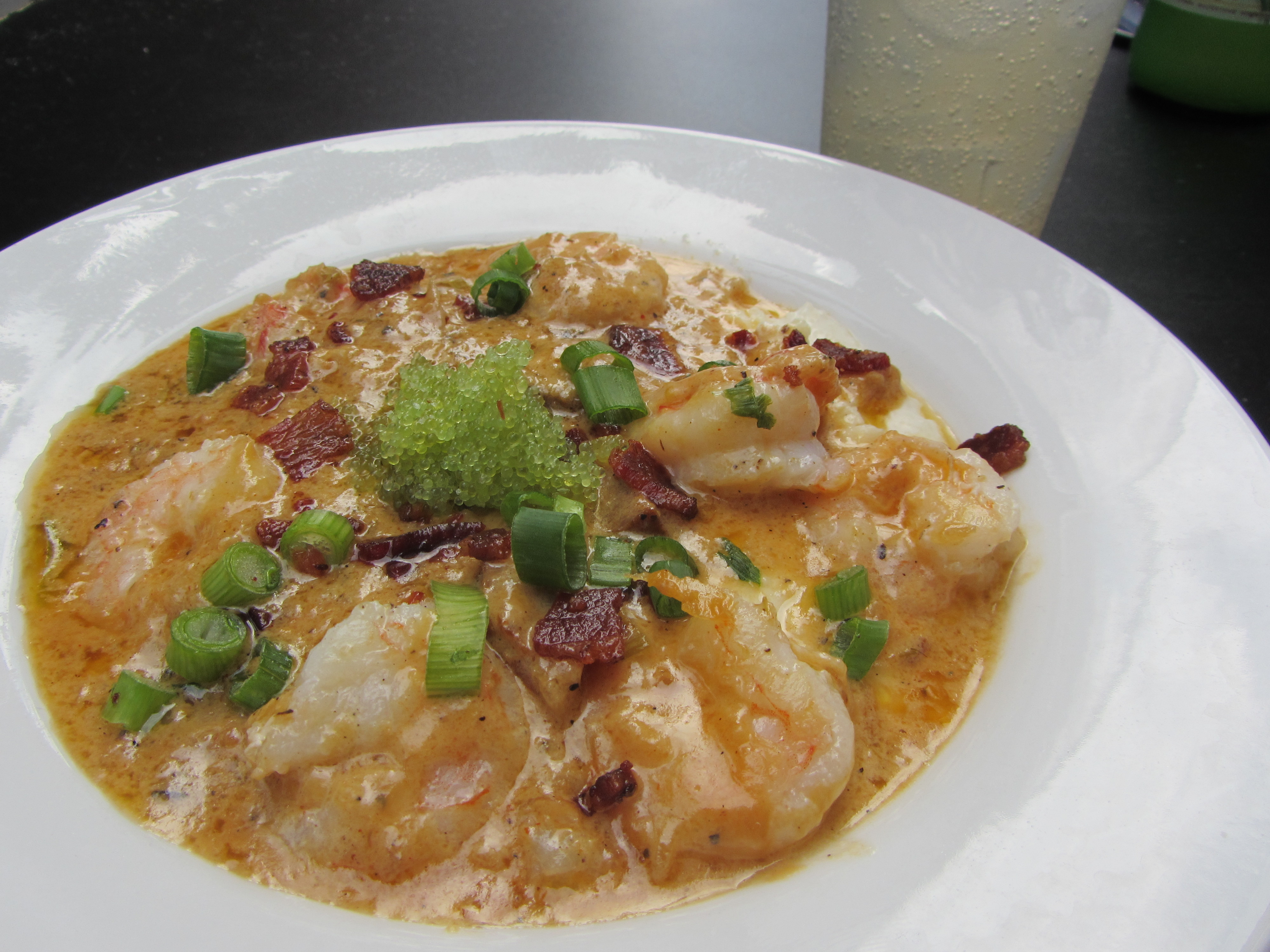
- Shrimp and grits in Charleston, South Carolina
- Course: Breakfast
- Place of origin: United States
- Region or state: Lowcountry
- Main ingredients: Shrimp in grits

Shrimp and grits is a dish that combines sautéed shrimp with grits—a porridge of boiled cornmeal. Shrimp and grits are associated with Lowcountry cuisine, eaten in coastal Georgia and South Carolina—John Martin Taylor says "I know of no dish more typically Lowcountry". Historically in the region, shrimp and grits were often eaten as breakfast during shrimp season, which peaks around November. The shrimp used were invariably small and sourced from creeks. In the southern US, shrimp and grits is today eaten as a comfort food. It resembles shrimp étouffée, a Cajun shrimp stew that is served over rice.

== Preparations ==
Preparations range widely, in their most simple only sautéing the shrimp with butter. Such preparations are typical in Charleston, South Carolina, alongside versions that cook shrimp in rendered bacon fat alongside onion and peppers. Some of the more complicated preparations draw from the cookery of nouvelle cuisine, and involve preparing a sauce from a reduced shrimp-shell stock.

Since the 1990s in the Charleston area, chefs have served modified versions of shrimp and grits, integrating ingredients such as cream and French shallots which had until then not been a part of Lowcountry cuisine. The development was part of a broader trend, as a culture of eating at restaurants and chefs modifying traditional recipes took hold. Such contemporary restaurant iterations of shrimp and grits have not always been met with approval. The Charleston-born author Jack Hitt gives an account of ordering shrimp and grits in a restaurant in the city, and receiving a small and complex appetizer he described as a "congealed puck of fusion gunk". Shrimp and grits, said Hitt, was a means of consuming large quantities of shrimp, making a haute version like "putting a Victoria's Secret teddy on the family dog".

== Name ==
Shrimp and grits have been known under a number of names. At restaurants, "shrimp and grits" is the most common name, while in the Lowcountry, "breakfast shrimps" was most common, with "breakfast shrimp with tomatoes" used among the Louisiana Creole, and "breakfast shrimp with hominy" identified as the dish's name by Arturo Schomburg early in the 20th century. Among the Gullah Geechee, names have included "shrimp gravy" and "smuttered shrimp". In the cookbook 200 Years of Charleston Cooking (1931), a recipe for shrimp and grits is given under the name "shrimp and hominy", with credit for its creation given approvingly to black cooks.

== History ==
An early dish similar to shrimp and grits is identified by Michael W. Twitty in his 2017 book The Cooking Gene. As corn was brought from the Americas to Africa, it was integrated into the diet of some populations that would later be brought to the southern US as part of the Atlantic slave trade. In central and southeastern Africa, this was eaten as a porridge, alongside foods that included shrimp. In America, the development of shrimp and grits is credited by the food writer Rachel Wharton to the Gullah Geechee people, a group of enslaved Africans brought to South Carolina to farm rice. The earliest versions of shrimp and grits, she says, were Gullah Geechee preparations of fried shrimp, coated with flour, salt and pepper that were served with a roux and cereal grains such as rice, millet, or corn.

== See also ==
- List of seafood dishes
- Shrimp and prawn as food

== Sources ==
- Lee, Matt; Lee, Ted (2007). "Restaurants, Charleston". In Wilson, Charles Reagan (ed.). The New Encyclopedia of Southern Culture. Vol. 7: Foodways. Chapel Hill, North Carolina: University of North Carolina Press. ISBN 978-0-8078-3146-5.
- Hitt, Jack (2008). "Lowcountry Lowdown". In Reed, Dale Volberg; Reed, John Shelton (eds.). Cornbread Nation 4: The Best of Southern Food Writing. Athens, Georgia and London: The University of Georgia Press. ISBN 978-0-8203-3089-1.
- Mariani, John (1999) [1983]. The Encyclopedia of American Food and Drink (Revised and updated ed.). New York: Lebhar-Friedman, Inc. ISBN 0-86730-784-6.
- Taylor, John Martin (1992). Hoppin' John's Lowcountry Cooking: Recipes and Ruminations from Charleston & the Carolina Coastal Plain. New York and Toronto, Ontario: Bantam Books. ISBN 0-553-08231-0.
- Thorn, Bret (2013). "Comfort food". In Smith, Andrew F. (ed.). The Oxford Encyclopedia of Food and Drink in America. Vol. 1 (2nd ed.). New York: Oxford University Press. ISBN 978-0-19-973496-2.
- Tipton-Martin, Toni (2015). The Jemima Code: Two Centuries of African American Cookbooks. Austin, Texas: University of Texas Press. ISBN 978-0-292-74548-3.
- Tipton-Martin, Toni (2019). Jubilee: Recipes from Two Centuries of African American Cooking. New York: Clarkson Potter. ISBN 978-1-524-76173-8.
- Twitty, Michael W (2017). The Cooking Gene. New York: HarperCollins Publishers. ISBN 978-0-062-37929-0.
- Wharton, Rachel (2019). American Food: A Not-So-Serious History. New York: Abrams Image. ISBN 978-1-4197-3814-2.
