= The Jemima Code: Two Centuries of African American Cookbooks =

2015 American nonfiction book by Toni Tipton-Martin

The Jemima Code: Two Centuries of African American Cookbooks is a 2015 American nonfiction book by Toni Tipton-Martin. It won the 2016 James Beard Award for Reference and Scholarship.

== Description ==
The volume is the first in a related series of books Tipton-Martin wrote using historical cookbooks by or featuring the recipes of African American chefs dating back to the early 1800s. The book documents little-known cookbooks by African American professional chefs. It discusses stereotypes about African American cooking, including the inaccurate assumption that African American cuisine includes only soul food, Southern rural cuisine, and poverty foods. It explores the influence Black chefs and recipes created by Black chefs had on food culture in the United States. The book argues that Southern cuisine is a fusion cuisine derived from the cuisines of Africa, Europe and the Caribbean that was created by uncredited Black chefs. Tipton-Martin argues that stereotypes of Black cooks such as Aunt Jemima presented Black cooks' skills "as some kind of natural instinct [a]nd not through daily practice and daily refinement of one's craft".

== Development ==
Tipton-Martin has written that Freda DeKnight's 1948 A Date With A Dish: A Cookbook of American Negro Recipes, which recognized that not all African American cooking was rural Southern food or soul food, was an early influence when she was early in her career as a food journalist in the 1980s when she was in her early twenties. At the time, most food writing about African American cooking was about rural Southern cuisine or soul food.

Tipton-Martin began working on the project when she started collecting additional cookbooks by African American chefs and realized the image of Black cooks in American culture, and the perceptions of what constituted "African American cuisine", were inaccurate and didn't reflect the level of expertise among professional Black cooks and Black chefs of the previous 200 years, some of whom were enslaved or emancipated. She collected hundreds of historical cookbooks by Black chefs or featuring the recipes of Black chefs. She used resources such as the David Walker Lupton African American Cookbook Collection, housed at University of Alabama, as her "shopping list". Tipton-Martin took a took a seminar at Radcliffe College that explored the "methodology of interpreting a cookbook author’s words and meanings". She wrote essays about cookbooks written by African American and Black writers. She created an exhibit around the cookbook collection that was mounted in multiple museums.

Tipton-Martin has said The Jemima Code was conceived as a coffee table book “that would contradict the negative, degraded image" of the Mammy stereotype. She self-published the book as a blog after presenting it to an agent who "disappeared with her proposal" and being told there was no market for the book, which Tipton-Martin attributes to it "not [conforming] to the soul food only story". When she attended the 2008 Southern Foodways Symposium in Oxford, Missouri, she handed out stickers of Aunt Jemima's red bandana directing attendees to her blog.

== Selected writers ==
- Aunt Priscilla
- Pearl Bailey
- Cleora Butler
- Tunis Campbell Sr.
- Leah Chase
- Freda De Knight
- George Washington Carver
- Norma Jean Darden
- Rufus Estes
- Sheila Ferguson
- Abby Fisher
- Dick Gregory
- Jessica B. Harris
- Flora Mae Hunter
- Mahalia Jackson
- Inez Yeargan Kaiser
- Austin Leslie
- Edna Lewis
- Mark May
- Alice McGill
- Bea Moten-Foster
- Elijah Muhammad
- Queen Ida
- Lena Richard
- Robert Roberts
- Charlemae Hill Rollins
- Malinda Russell
- Bobby Seale
- Vertamae Smart-Grosvenor
- Lucille Bishop Smith
- Mary Carter Smith
- Sue Bailey Thurman
- Bertha L. Turner
- Charleszetta Waddles

== Selected books ==
- Picayune Creole Cook Book

== Reception ==
The book won the 2016 James Beard Award for Reference and Scholarship.

Tipton-Martin followed up the book, which was a work of scholarship and won the 2016 James Beard Award for Reference and Scholarship, with the cookbooks Jubilee: Recipes from Two Centuries of African American Cooking in 2019 and Juke Joints, Jazz Clubs, and Juice: Cocktails from Two Centuries of African American Cookbooks in 2023.
