= Pork cake =

Cake containing salt pork

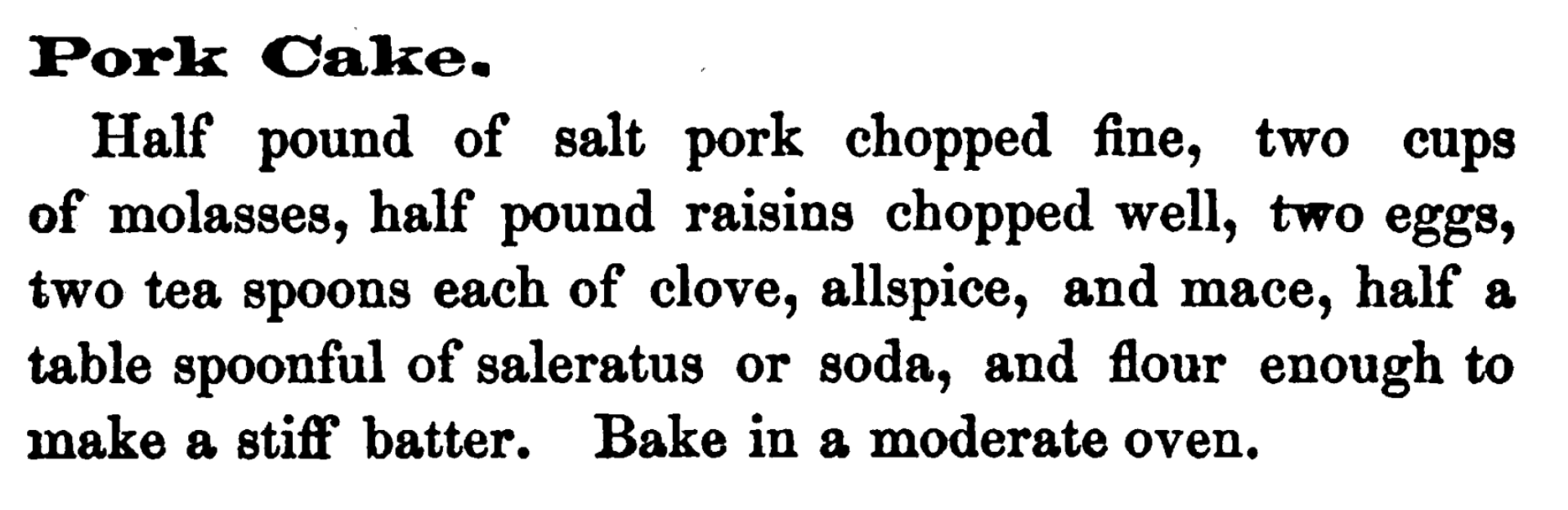
Recipe from an 1865 cookbook

Pork cakes are a class of cakes that use salt pork—salt-cured pork—in place of other shortenings. For this ingredient, they are sometimes called salt pork cakes.

Pork cakes were eaten in the United States during the 19th and 20th centuries. Like mince pies, they combined meat and fruit, but here, the mixture was not allowed to ferment. One type of pork cake in the 19th century was the temperance cake, a type of plum cake which omitted wine. Another was the molasses (or 'lasses) cake, a common dish among African-American cooks living on plantations. This cake combined a basic pork cake with ingredients such as molasses and granulated sugar, raisins, and spices including allspice, nutmeg, and cloves. Pork cakes continued to be eaten into the 20th century, as seen in a 1914 pamphlet The Farmer Jones Cook Book, which included a recipe for a spiced pork cake with dried fruit but no eggs or dairy. In 1963, the librarian Charlemae Hill Rollins included a recipe in a Christmas anthology of African-American texts. Writing on the inclusion, culinary historian Toni Tipton-Martin proposes the recipe was chosen as Rollins considered it "easy to make and share."

The use of salt pork as a shortener was often informed by price, but could also be informed by what was on-hand; in a reflection on her childhood in Illinois during the early 20th century, the writer Helen Walker Linsenmeyer commented that with salt pork on hand, "notice of the imminent arrival of the traveling "preacher" for dinner, or a group of relatives from afar seldom caught Grandmother unprepared." Pork meat was also used in some preparations; by combining it with flour and shortening and baking it into a cake, cooks could make their cooked pork last longer.

The amount of salt pork that could be used was at times not insubstantial. One recipe, published by Mrs S. G. Knight in her 1864 cookbook Tit-Bits; Or, How to Prepare a Nice Dish at a Moderate Expense required half a pound of the ingredient (around a quarter of a kilogram), producing a cake that would have tasted strongly of salt.

== See also ==
- List of cakes

== Sources ==
- McWilliams, Jacqueline B (1996). The Way We Ate: Pacific Northwest Cooking, 1843-1900. Pullman, Washington: Washington State University Press. ISBN 0-87422-137-4.
- Stavely, Keith; Fitzgerald, Kathleen (2004). America's Founding Food: The Story of New England Cooking. Chapel Hill, North Carolina & London: The University of North Carolina Press. ISBN 0-8078-2894-7.
- Stavely, Keith; Fitzgerald, Kathleen (2011). Northern Hospitality: Cooking by the Book in New England. Amherst & Boston: University of Massachusetts Press. ISBN 978-1-55849-861-7.
- Tipton-Martin, Toni (2015). The Jemima Code: Two Centuries of African American Cookbooks. Austin, Texas: University of Texas Press. ISBN 978-0-292-74548-3.
- Tipton-Martin, Toni (2019). Jubilee: Recipes from Two Centuries of African American Cooking. New York: Clarkson Potter. ISBN 978-1-524-76173-8.
- Veit, Helen Zoe, ed. (2014). Food in the Civil War Era: The North. American Food in History. East Lansing: Michigan State University Press. ISBN 978-1-61186-122-8.
- Walker Linsenmeyer, Helen (2011) [1976]. Cooking Plain, Illinois Country Style. Carbondale and Edwardsville, Illinois: Southern Illinois University Press. ISBN 978-0-8093-0782-1.
