= Linda Goss =

American storyteller and performer

- Born: Linda Yvonne McNear; 1947 (age 78–79); Alcoa, Tennessee, U.S.
- Other name: Mama Linda
- Education: Howard University (B.A.); Antioch University (M.Ed.)
- Occupations: Storyteller, author
- Spouse: Clay Goss
- Children: 3
- Writing career
- Years active: 1973–present
- Genres: Children's literature, storytelling
- Notable awards: National Heritage Fellowship (2019)

Linda Yvonne Goss (née McNear, born 1947), sometimes known professionally as Mama Linda, is an American storyteller and performer in the African diasporic oral tradition. She is a co-founder of the National Association of Black Storytellers, which works to preserve folk traditions.

== Early life and education ==
Linda Yvonne McNear was born in Alcoa, Tennessee to Willie and Junior McNear. Her mother was a teacher and her father worked at the Aluminum Company of America (Alcoa). She grew up in a large storytelling family, and often cites tales heard from her Granddaddy Murphy and Uncle Buster as her earliest influences. Her mother was a frequent public speaker at Blount County churches and civic events, and Goss learned speaking techniques from her mother's example. From her father, she learned a love of music, particularly jazz, and an appreciation for the way stories can be told through music. In grade school, her teachers wrote on her report cards that she "talks too much".

Goss's interest in the oral tradition began when she was in high school, working on an assignment to interview the oldest person she knew. After interviewing her grandfather, she realized that old stories like the folklore and personal history he shared with her would be lost if they weren't passed on and collected.

She graduated from Charles M. Hall High School in 1965, and went on to study drama at Howard University, earning her bachelor's degree in 1969. While at Howard, she acted in a play opposite Ruby Dee and Ossie Davis, and participated in the experimental Theater Black troupe, performing the works of Leroi Jones and Norman Jordan. For her senior project, she told stories that had been derived from her childhood in Alcoa. She imbued her performances with elements from folk storytelling and oral tradition, in a collision of styles that was considered unusual at a time when vernacular traditions were kept separate from "fine" arts. She later earned a master's degree in education from Antioch University. She is a member of Zeta Phi Beta sorority.

== Career ==
Goss was a leader in the resurgence of American storytelling traditions that began in the 1970s. Her first professional stage performance was in Washington, D.C. in 1973. She was a featured storyteller at the 1975 Smithsonian Festival of American Folklife. It was at this festival that she developed her signature style of beginning a storytelling performance by crying out "Well, Oh Well, Oh Well. It’s Storytelling Time!" while ringing bells to gather the crowd and focus its attention. Goss would later trace the lineage of this calling to her grandfather, who had once been responsible for playing a bugle call to wake workers on a plantation in Alabama. She calls it "waking up the people", in honor of and in conversation with this legacy.

Goss's storytelling is influenced by folk tales, poetry, history, and musical forms including jazz, gospel, and country. She sees storytelling as a "tool for social change": a responsive and flexible art form that can be adapted and transformed to fit the immediate context of the teller and the audience.

One of her mentors was the folklorist and art historian Gladys-Marie Fry, a professor at the University of Maryland. Other storytellers, artists, and scholars of folklore were sources of encouragement and community, including Brother Blue, Stephen Henderson, Sonia Sanchez, Ella Jenkins, Jackie Torrence, and Mary Carter Smith.

She worked in Philadelphia for over 30 years, and was named by the mayor as that city's official storyteller in 1984.

On February 1, 1984, Goss appeared on the NPR radio show Horizons in an episode titled "Storytelling in the Tradition". She demonstrated the African tradition of storytelling, with examples of tales, chants, and games, as well as describing the technique of her craft. She also appeared on The Today Show and was profiled in several major newspapers including The New York Times, The Washington Post, The Philadelphia Inquirer, as well as in Essence magazine.

She has performed at numerous storytelling festivals and events, including the National Storytelling Festival in Jonesborough, Tennessee and has taught classes in the art of storytelling at East Tennessee State University.

She is the author or editor of six books, has recorded several albums, and her stories have been collected in several anthologies and children's reading textbooks.

=== National Association of Black Storytellers ===
After attending a 1982 national storytelling conference at which she was one of only two Black participants, Goss realized there was a need for spaces focused specifically on Black storytelling and folk traditions. She and Mary Carter Smith co-founded the "In The Tradition..." Annual National Black Storytelling Festival and Conference in 1982, followed in 1984 by the creation of the National Association of Black Storytellers. Goss served as the Association's first president, from 1984–1991. At the time of the Association's founding, there were only five African American storytellers invited to national storytelling festivals. Through these organizations, they worked to organize storytellers and provide a platform to increase their visibility, as well as to preserve the oral tradition and ensure stories and folkways were not lost.

Goss is a co-founder of Keepers of the Culture, a Philadelphia storytelling organization affiliated with the National Association of Black Storytellers, and a founding member of Patchwork, a storytelling group in Delaware.

== Personal life ==
Goss lives in Baltimore, Maryland with her husband Clay, a journalist and playwright, with whom she has co-authored several books. They were married in 1969 and have three children: Aisha, Uhuru, and Jamal.

== Works ==
=== Books ===
- The Baby Leopard: A "How" and "Why" Story by Linda Goss and Clay Goss (1989)
- Talk That Talk: an Anthology of African-American Storytelling edited by Linda Goss and Marian E. Barnes (1989)
- Jump Up and Say! A Collection of Black Storytelling edited by Linda Goss and Clay Goss (1995)
- It's Kwanzaa Time! by Linda Goss and Clay Goss (1995)
- The Frog Who Wanted to Be a Singer by Linda Goss (1995)
- Sayin' Somethin': Stories from the National Association of Black Storytellers edited by Linda Goss, Dylan Pritchett and Caroliese Frink Reed (2006)

==== Anthologies ====
- "The Traveling Storyteller" is featured in On the Horizon (1989), a third-grade reader.
- Her most well-known story, "The Frog Who Wanted to Be a Singer" appears in Elements of Literature (1989), an eighth grade reader.
- Her adaptation of "The Ghost Hunt" is included in The Ghost & I: Scary Stories for Participatory Telling (1992).
- Her "Storytelling Rap" is included in the audio anthology A Storytelling Treasury (1993).
- Her story "The Tree of Love" is included in I Hear a Symphony: African Americans Celebrate Love (1994).
- "Rabbit at the Waterhole" is included in Joining In: An Anthology of Audience Participation Stories & How to Tell Them (1995).

=== Sound recordings ===
- Afro-American Folktales and Playsongs by Linda Goss (1980), (re-released 2003)
- It's Story Telling Time by Linda Goss (1983), (re-released 2001)
- The Baby Leopard by Linda Goss and Clay Goss (1989)
- African Tales and Games by Linda Goss (1993)

== Awards and honors ==
- Goss is a recipient of a 2019 National Heritage Fellowship awarded by the National Endowment for the Arts, which is the United States government's highest honor in the folk and traditional arts. She is the first African-American fellow honored for storytelling.
- In October 2019, the American Folklore Society hosted a forum in Baltimore titled Black Storytelling and Cultural Preservation: The Legacy of Mama Linda Goss.
- In 2018, Goss received the Legacy of Excellence Award from the Alcoa City Schools Foundation.
- In 2017, Goss became the storyteller-in-residence at the Peale Center in Baltimore, Maryland. She is also the storyteller-ambassador for the National Great Blacks in Wax Museum, and has been a storyteller-in-residence at the Rosenbach Museum and Library in Philadelphia.
- In 2016, Goss was one of several honorees for the American Women's Heritage Society "Movers and Shakers" award.
- In 2013, she received the Kathryn Morgan Award for Folk Arts & Social Justice from the Philadelphia Folklore Project. Morgan was a mentor to Goss.
- In 2006, she was honored with the Benjamin A. Botkin Scholar Lecturer Award from the American Folklife Center at the Library of Congress.
- She received the 2006 Leeway Transformation Award for women artists.
- She earned the 2005 Fellowship in Folk and Traditional Art from the Pennsylvania Council on the Arts.
- In 2003, Goss received the National Storytelling Network's Oracle lifetime achievement award.
- In 1995, her book Jump Up and Say! was named as a Literary Guild selection.
- In 1990, her book Talk That Talk was named as a Book-of-the-Month Club Quality Paperback selection.
- She became the official storyteller for the city of Philadelphia in 1984, and her image is featured on a mural in that city as "The Traveling Storyteller".
- Both Alcoa, Tennessee and Washington, D.C. have celebrated "Linda Goss Day" (dates unknown).
