= Sallie Blair =

- Blair on a 1960 cover of Sepia magazine

Background information
- Also known as: Sally Blair
- Born: Sarah Bolling Mason Hutchins; April 27, 1934; Baltimore, Maryland, U.S.
- Died: February 17, 1992 (age 57) Baltimore, Maryland, U.S.
- Genres: Vocal jazz, swing
- Occupation: Vocalist
- Labels: Bethlehem; MGM; Top Rank; Scepter; Bell
- Formerly of: Duke Ellington; Johnny Otis; Cab Calloway

Sallie Blair (April 27, 1934 – February 17, 1992) was an American jazz singer. She began her career performing as a band act with Johnny Otis and Duke Ellington before joining Cab Calloway's Cotton Club Revue. Blair recorded for Bethlehem, MGM, Scepter, and Bell Records, but she was best known for her live performances. Because of her voluptuous figure and blonde hair, Miles Davis called her the "brown Marilyn Monroe."

== Life and career ==
Blair was born Sarah Bolling Mason Hutchins in Baltimore, Maryland on April 27, 1934. She was the daughter of Sarah (Pat) Mason and pro golfer Carlos Hutchins. She attended Douglass High School and began performing at 16 in 1950. Accompanied by her mother, she used the stage name Sally Blair (also spelled Sallie), while performing at local clubs such as Gamby's, the Casino, and Eddie Leonard's Spa. She performed in clubs in Chicago and Los Angeles before replacing an ailing act at New York's Waldorf-Astoria. After graduation, she toured with Duke Ellington and Johnny Otis. In 1953, tired of one-nighters, she left the band business in Los Angeles to pursue a solo career.

In 1956, Blair won the talent competition Chance of a Lifetime on ABC-TV hosted by Dennis James. She sang "Cry Me A River" and "It's Alright With Me," winning the top prize of $1,000 and a one-week engagement at the Versailles nightclub Miami. During her gig, Blair's electrifying performances captivated her audiences especially during her closing number of "That Old Black Magic" when she would kick off her shoes. Celebrities who attended her shows included syndicated columnist Walter Winchell and jazz bandleader Cab Calloway. Calloway hired her to become the featured female vocalist in his Miami Beach Cotton Club Revue. Blair received rave reviews, but despite offers of a raise, she left the revue while they were in Las Vegas because she "found the treatment of colored artists too objectionable to stay."

Blair sang the role of Serena in the jazz version of George Gershwin's opera Porgy and Bess, released by Bethlehem Records in 1956. In October 1956, she headlined at the Boulevard nightclub in Queens, New York before relocating to California. In Hollywood, she made her debut at the Mocambo in November 1956. Blair gained some acclaim, performing in South America, the Middle East, and Europe. She appeared in various publications, including Life magazine, Esquire, Ebony and Jet. She also appeared on The Ed Sullivan Show and Johnny Carson.

Blair released her debut album Squeeze Me on Bethlehem in 1957. In 1958, Blair headlined Donn Arden's production at New York's Latin Quarter. That summer, Ed Sullivan signed her to appear on his variety show televised from the Desert Inn in Las Vegas from Jul 1 to 28. Blair's second album, Hello, Tiger!, arranged and conducted by Neal Hefti, was released on MGM Records later in 1958. The album was chosen as one of Billboard's spotlight winners of the week (November 3, 1958): "A striking cover (featuring the sultry thrush on a tiger-skin rug) gives this package sock display value; while the canary's sexy, intimate vocalizing makes the LP's sure-fire Jockey programming. Gal shines on a group of standards and show tunes, including the infectious 'Daddy,' 'Fever' and 'Witchcraft.'"

Blair didn't achieve success on the charts with her records, but she gained a following for her sensual barefoot performances. While performing at the London Palladium, Blair kicked of her shoes in front of the royal family. She became more known for her voluptuous figure and her sexy stage appearance than her music. Her natural hair color was auburn, but she dyed it different colors such as platinum blonde, silver, red, green, black, and white. Early in Blair's career, the press referred to her as the "blonde bombshell," but by 1963, when she appeared at her nightclub gig at New York's Living Room, she was sporting dark brown hair and her stage persona became more sophisticated.

Blair performed with Larry Steele's Smart Affairs of 1960. As her popularity waned, Blair continued to appear on TV Shows throughout the 1960s, including The Danny Kaye Show, Away We Go, and The Rosey Grier Show.

After suffering from an illness and undergoing corrective surgery, Blair returned to Baltimore to be with her mother in 1990. Blair spent three weeks in the intensive care unit shortly before returning to her mother's apartment where she died at the age of 57 on February 17, 1992.

== Personal life ==
In 1963, Blair married pianist and arranger René DeKnight, widower of Freda DeKnight and formerly of The Delta Rhythm Boys, in Honolulu where DeKnight was heading his own trio. She was romantically linked to actor Warren Beatty in the late 1970s.

== Discography ==
=== Studio albums ===
- 1957: Squeeze Me (Bethlehem Records)
- 1958: Hello, Tiger! (MGM Records)

=== Compilations ===
- 2015: Sallie Blair: Complete Albums And Singles 1957-1962

=== Album appearances ===
- 1956: George Gershwin's Porgy & Bess (Bethlehem Records)
- 1958: Meet The Girls (AAMCO Records)
- 1976: Bethlehem's Finest Volume 10 (Bethlehem Records)
- 2000: Jazz Vocal On Bethlehem (Bethlehem Records)
- 2013: Love Me Or Leave Me: The Bethlehem Records Story (One Day Music)

=== Singles ===
- 1957: "Ain't She Sweet" / "How Long Has This Been Going On" (Bethlehem 6009)
- 1958: "Whatever Lola Wants" / "Daddy" (MGM 1000)
- 1958: "Don'cha Go 'Way Mad" / "When The Sun Comes Out" (MGM 2673)
- 1958: "She Serves A Nice Cup Of Tea" / "Daddy" (MGM 2725)
- 1960: "More Than Anything" / "That Remains To Be Seen" (Top Rank International 2029)
- 1960: "It's A Sin To Tell A Lie" / "A Kiss A Day" (Top Rank International 2045)
- 1961: "Keep An Eye On Your Man" / "In The Still Of The Night" (Scepter 1216)
- 1962: "Come By Sunday" / "Then I'll Be Tired Of You" (Bethlehem 3010)
- 1971: "Let Me Come In" / "Walk, Proudly Walk" (Bell 967)
