= René DeKnight =

- Born: Edgadito De Knight; December 5, 1913; New York, Nork, U.S.
- Died: January 24, 2004 (aged 90) Cameron Park, California, U.S.
- Formerly of: The Delta Rhythm Boys; The 5th Dimension

René DeKnight (December 5, 1913 – January 24, 2004) was an American pianist, composer and arranger. He was a member of The Delta Rhythm Boys. He arranged and played on many of their influential work, including "Dry Bones" and "Take The A Train". DeKnight also played with Ella Fitzgerald and later became the arranger and composer for The 5th Dimension. He is the older brother of American visual artist Avel de Knight.

== Biography ==
DeKnight was born in New York City on December 5, 1913.

He was a member of the vocal group The Delta Rhythm Boys as a pianist and arranger. They appeared in numerous films, including So's Your Uncle (1943), Crazy House (1943), Hi, Good Lookin'! (1944), Follow the Boys (1944), and Easy to Look At (1945). In 1945, the group appeared in the Broadway musical Memphis Bound!. DeKnight also wrote songs for the group and backed Ella Fitzgerald on piano.

In 1940, DeKnight married Freda Alexander who became Ebony magazine's first food editor in 1944, and later as the fashion editor she staged the first Ebony Fashion Fair in 1957. In 1962, René took and 8-week leave from The Delta Rhythm Boys to travel to Hawaii and Japan where Freda selected fashions for the 1962 production of the Ebony Fashion Fair. She died in 1963 from cancer. Later in 1963, DeKnight married jazz singer Sallie Blair in Honolulu where he was heading his own trio. He was later married to a woman named Marie.

DeKnight became the music arranger and conductor for The 5th Dimension in 1966. He played a major part in shaping the groups sound by adding jazz elements to their music.

DeKnight died at the age of 90 in Cameron Park, California on January 24, 2004.
