= Chicken bog =

Lowcountry chicken pilaf

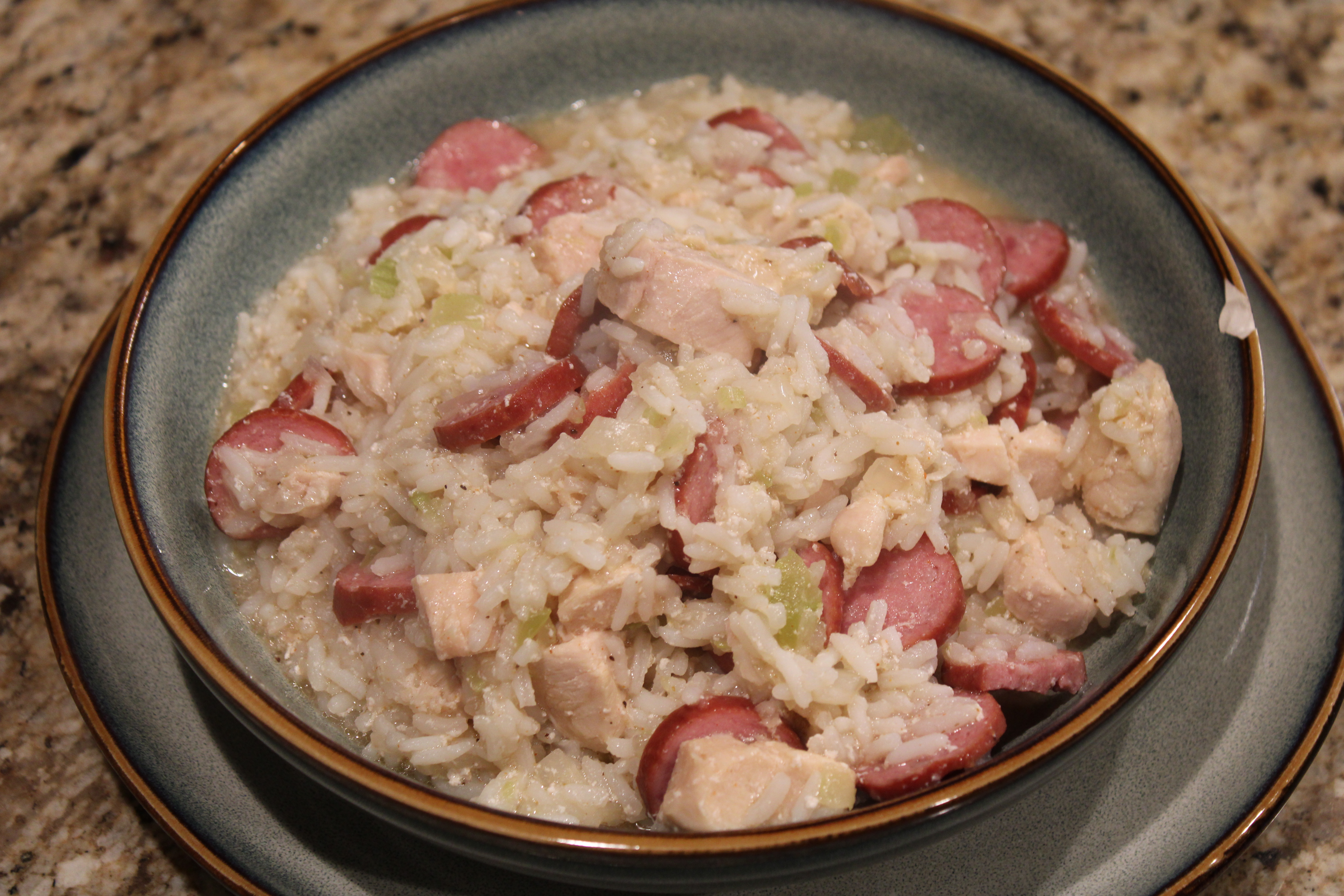
A bowl of homemade Chicken Bog

Chicken bog is a pilaf dish from Lowcountry cuisine, made of rice and chicken, sausage, onion, and spices. Chicken bog is most popular in Horry County - the home of Myrtle Beach and Conway, South Carolina - and west to Florence, South Carolina. Chicken bog is prepared by boiling a whole chicken until tender (with the sausage, onion, and spices, if included), then the rice is added and cooked until it absorbs all the liquid. Cooks often pick the bones and other inedible parts out of the pot and discard them before adding the rice to the meat and other ingredients. There are some recipes out there that include green peppers and other vegetables, but the purists insist that the only ingredients should be chicken, smoked sausage, rice, salt and pepper and perhaps onion.

Loris, South Carolina is the chicken bog capital of the world where they salute this favorite dish at the "Loris Bog-Off". Chicken bog is made different ways in different places, but is most common in the Pee Dee and Lowcountry regions of South Carolina.

== Origin of name ==
The name "bog" most likely comes from the wetness of the dish, but it has been speculated that the names came from the bogginess of the area in which it is popular. It is closely related to chicken pilaf, except that it is more "boggy". It is more moist than chicken pilaf, which is more common in Georgetown County, just to the South of Horry County.

== See also ==
- List of chicken dishes
- List of sausage dishes
- Lowcountry cuisine
