= Toni Tipton-Martin =

American culinary historian, journalist, author (born c. 1958)

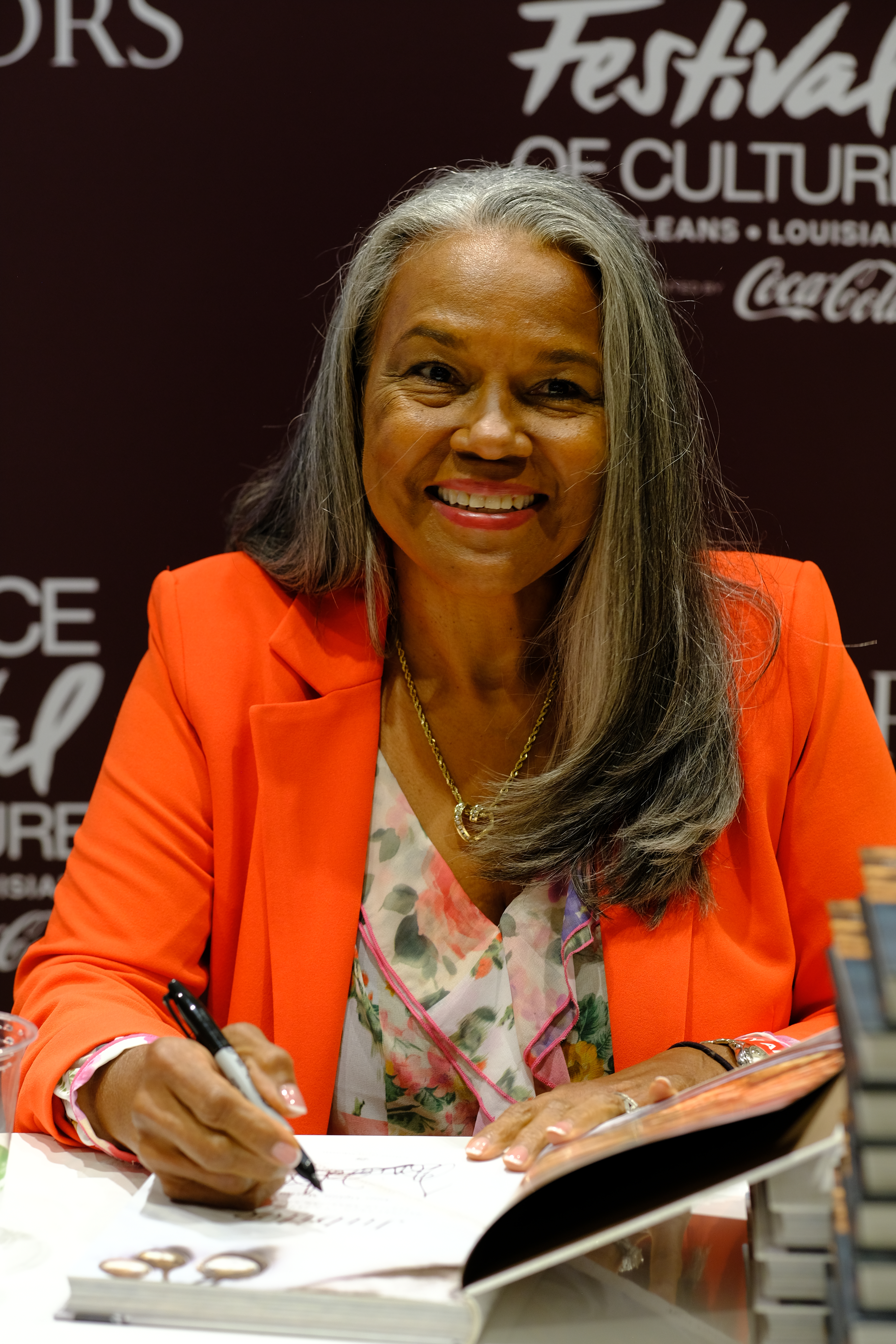
- Toni Tipton-Martin at Essence Festival 2025
- Born: 1958 or 1959 (age 67–68); Los Angeles, California, U.S.
- Education: University of Southern California (BA)
- Occupations: Food journalist, culinary historian, editor, author
- Spouse: Bruce Martin
- Awards: Julia Child Award, James Beard Foundation Award
- Website: https://tonitiptonmartin.com/

Toni Tipton-Martin (born c. 1958) is an American food journalist, culinary historian, editor, and author of several books. She is a three-time James Beard award winner and a Julia Child Award winner.

Her books include The Jemima Code: Two Centuries of African American Cookbooks, Jubilee: Recipes from Two Centuries of African American Cooking, and Juke Joints, Jazz Clubs, and Juice: Cocktails from Two Centuries of African American Cookbooks.

She has received the Julia Child Award and three James Beard awards, one for Jemima Code for Research and Scholarship, one for Jubilee for Best American Cookbook, and a Lifetime Achievement award.

She serves as editor-in-chief for Cook's Country.

== Early life and education ==
Tipton-Martin grew up in Southern California. Her father was Charles Hamilton; he died in 1995. She and her parents lived with her grandmother in South Los Angeles before moving to the Windsor Hills neighborhood.

She graduated in 1981 with a bachelor's degree in journalism from the University of Southern California. She worked part time in the recipe section at a community newspaper, The Wave.

== Career ==
Tipton-Martin started at the Los Angeles Times as a nutrition reporter in 1983. She has written that Freda DeKnight's 1948 A Date With A Dish: A Cookbook of American Negro Recipes, which recognized that not all African American cooking was rural Southern food or soul food, was an early influence during this period.

Ruth Reichl became food editor at the Times in 1990 and encouraged Tipton-Martin to expand into food journalism. She moved to the Cleveland Plain Dealer as food editor in 1991, where she was the first Black person to serve as editor of a food section for a major U.S. newspaper. She was at the Plain Dealer for five years.

Tipton-Martin took a two-decade long hiatus from full-time work in the industry to raise her children, but did freelance writing and editing.

Chef Joe Randall with Tipton-Martin authored, A Taste of Heritage: The New African American Cuisine (1998).

When she re-entered full time work, she took a took a seminar at Radcliffe College that explored the "methodology of interpreting a cookbook author’s words and meanings". She wrote essays about cookbooks written by African American and Black writers.

She was named editor in chief for Cook's Country in 2020, replacing former editor Tucker Shaw. She does a segment on each episode on the history of the episode's featured dish from the parlor of her Baltimore home.

Tipton-Martin's books focus on African American culinary history, and as part of the work involved in writing them, Tipton-Martin researched various historical cookbooks by Black Americans. As of 2022 she had collected around 450 cookbooks written by African Americans. One of her first acquisitions was Eliza's Cook Book (1936). The oldest book in her collection is The House Servant's Directory (1827).

Her 2015 The Jemima Code: Two Centuries of African American Cookbooks explored the expertise of 19th and 20th century African American professional chefs and cookbook writers, some of whom were enslaved or emancipated. She self-published The Jemima Code as a blog after presenting it to an agent who "disappeared with her proposal" and being told there was no market for the book, which Tipton-Martin attributes to it "not [conforming] to the soul food only story". The book won the 2016 James Beard Award for Research and Scholarship.

Her 2019 Jubilee: Recipes from Two Centuries of African American Cooking continued the exploration of the historical cookbooks, this time focusing on the recipes, which she created modern interpretations of and presented side-by-side, and the chefs who created them. Serious Eats said it 'reverses the idea that all Black American foodways are "Southern" or "soul food" ' or that all African American cooking was the food of poverty. The book won the 2020 James Beard Award for Best American Cookbook.

Her 2023 Juke Joints, Jazz Clubs, and Juice: Cocktails from Two Centuries of African American Cookbooks focuses on how African American mixologists influenced American cocktail culture and discusses the history of juke joints. Jessica B. Harris said that what Tipton-Martin had done with the book "is essentially create a mixologist’s parallel to what she did in ‘Jubilee' ". VinePair said it continued Jubilee's "journey through the lens of drinks and the Black bartenders who have helped pave the nation’s cocktail culture".

She appeared in an episode of High on the Hog: How African American Cuisine Transformed America in which she discussed how the food marketing industry has used images of Black people.

== Reception ==
The New York Times said The Jemima Code and Jubilee had "redefined the story of Black cooks in America". NPR said the books had "cast a spotlight on the unsung stories of Black cooks in America". The Baltimore Sun called her "one of the leading authorities in the history of Black food". The Wall Street Journal called her "a leading authority on African American foodways". Harris said Jubilee and Juke Joints, Jazz Clubs, and Juice together form "a diptych of the food of African Americans, as revealed through their cookbooks".

== Board work ==
Tipton-Martin is a founding member and former president of Southern Foodways Alliance.

== Books ==
- The Jemima Code: Two Centuries of African American Cookbooks (University of Texas Press, 2015)
- Jubilee: Recipes from Two Centuries of African-American Cooking (Clarkson Potter, 2019)
- Juke Joints, Jazz Clubs, and Juice: Cocktails from Two Centuries of African American Cookbooks (2023)

== Awards and honors ==
Tipton-Martin is the winner of three James Beard awards. In 2016, she won the Reference and Scholarship award for The Jemima Code, and Jubilee was awarded Best American Cookbook in 2020. In 2025 she received a Lifetime Achievement award.

She was the 2021 recipient of the Julia Child Award from the Julia Child Foundation for Gastronomy and the Culinary Arts. Tipton-Martin is the recipient of the International Association of Culinary Professionals (IACP) Trailblazer Award (2020) and its Book of the Year Award in 2020 for Jubilee.

== Personal life ==
Tipton-Martin is married to Bruce Martin. The couple moved to Baltimore in 2018; as of 2022 they live in the Charles Village neighborhood in a 120-year-old rowhouse. The couple have four children. She is fluent in French.
