= The Arena Players =

Coordinates: 39°17′56″N 76°37′22″W

- Formation: 1953
- Type: Theatre group
- Location: 801 McCulloh Street, Baltimore, MD
- Artistic director: Donald Owens

Arena Players Incorporated (or Arena Playhouse) is the oldest continually performing and historically African-American community theatre in the United States, located in Baltimore, Maryland.

The theater runs several productions throughout the year as well as jazz and comedy shows, which take place every other month. It also offers programs for both children and adults who wish to perform: the Youtheatre program is for children between 4–18 years old and offers performing arts classes such as drama, music and dance as well as theater production; Studio 801 Program is a training and community outreach program for adults who want to perform.

== History ==
The Arena Players was established in September 1953 by Samuel H. Wilson, Irvin Turner. Jimmie Bell, Mary Carter Smith, Bernard Byrd, Doris Dilver, Arthur Thurgood, Joe Wilson, and Julius Wilson, on the campus of Coppin State University. The group initially met in the loft of a building on campus of Coppin that the students called “The House.” The group's first production was William Saroyan’s Hello Out There. The formation of Arena Players pre-dated the Black theatre movement, which was a part of the larger Black Arts Movement. Poet-playwright Imamu Amiri Baraka described Black theatre as “theater that actually functions to liberate Black people. It is a theater that will commit Black people to their own liberation and instruct them about what they should do and what they should be doing.”

The group was nomadic for its first ten years as it performed in a variety of locations around Baltimore: Coppin State University, the Druid Hill Avenue Branch of the YMCA, the Great Hall Theater of St. Mary's Church in the Walbrook neighborhood, and the Carl J. Murphy Auditorium at Morgan State University. In 1960, the Arena Players moved into a three-story building at 406 Orchard Street, that served multiple purposes history which they were able to purchase in 1969. As the group grew, the organization began to seek government funds in 1970s in order to expand their 200-seat home.

After a remodeling plan was developed with an estimate of $755,000, the Arena Players set about acquiring the funds to finance the project that they dubbed, “Our Possible Dream.” The three-phase redevelopment plan was financed through public donations and government funds: a $3,000 grant from the Maryland Arts Council and $321,000 federal grant made available through the city's Department of Housing and Community Development. The pro bono services of an architect were obtained through Neighborhood Design Center. Leon Bridges, the first registered African American architect in the state of Maryland, was assigned to the job. The ceremony occurred in August 1975 and the project was completed in October 1976.

The debut of the remodeled theatre was greeted with acclaim by the Baltimore press and was the subject of at least five articles in The Baltimore Sun in a three-week time span. Architect Leon Bridges published an opinion piece commending the Sun for their coverage and recommended that the newspaper continue their support through notices of coming attractions and featured articles. The new 300-seat structure was commemorated on October 22, 1976, with a performance of Langston Hughes’ Little Ham. According to Baltimore Sun journalist Earl Arnett, additional plans called for the renovation of the second and third floors of the building for office space and the group's long-standing plan to open a school. The Arena Players received a grant in 1981 from the State of Maryland for the renovations of the second and third floors of the building, which were completed the following year.
