= Recipes from the American South =

2025 book

- Author: Michael W. Twitty
- Genre: Cookbook
- Publisher: Phaidon Press
- Publication date: 2025

Recipes from the American South is a cookbook by food historian Michael W. Twitty, published by Phaidon Press in 2025.

== Background ==
Twitty was originally asked to find another author who could complete the book, but eventually decided to write it himself. It took five years to complete.

== Synopsis ==
The book is a compendium of the cuisine of the Southern United States, containing recipes and information about the regional development of each dish. Twitty wrote the book to more accurately reflect the scope and diversity of Southern food.

== Reception ==
The book was named one of the ten best books about food of 2025 by Smithsonian. The book received positive reviews for its recipes and historical research. Writing for The Wall Street Journal, Andrew Coe described the book as "an essential addition to the shelf of Southern cookbooks".

The book received a starred review in Library Journal and Foreword Reviews. Sarah Tansley of Library Journal wrote that "Twitty’s South is inclusive, recognizing Indigenous cultures and encompassing foodways from the mid-Atlantic to Oklahoma, with many stops in between. The smooth narrative balances personal stories, culinary details, and history. Recipes represent the South’s variety of cultures, ingredients, and influences". Rachel Jagareski of Foreword Reviews wrote that "The Southern sweet tooth and hospitality culture is evident in the bounteous dessert and beverage sections, full of sweet iced drinks, fruit and custard pies, and cakes piled high with icing. Photographs, a helpful glossary, and an impressive bibliography round out this defining culinary history."
