= Rufus Estes =

African-American chef and former slave

- Portrait of Rufus Estes from his cookbook, Good Things to Eat
- Born: c. April 1857; Maury County, Tennessee, US
- Died: 25 September 1939; Los Angeles, California, US
- Spouse: Laura Demoss (m. 1878)

Rufus Estes (c. 1857–1939) was an American chef and author. He was born into slavery and as an adult worked as a chef aboard luxury railway cars operated by the Pullman Company in the 19th century. His Good Things to Eat, published in 1911, is among the first cookbooks written by an African-American.

== Biography ==
Rufus Estes was born in Maury County, Tennessee, one of nine children. Two of his brothers died during the American Civil War (William Kennedy Estes died at the Battle of Chickamauga in 1863 as a First Sgt. in CSA 48th Regiment, Tennessee Infantry (Nixon's), Company E; George W. Estes died on 22 Jan 1865 in Tennessee, a Private in the 80th United States Colored Infantry Regiment). In 1867, the family moved to Nashville, Tennessee, where Estes' grandmother lived. He attended school for one term where he learned to read and write.

Estes first known job was as a cook's assistant at Hemphill's Restaurant, a fine dining establishment in Nashville, but it is believed that he started working when he was very young, around five years of age, as a slave in the fields. Estes worked in Nashville between the ages of 16 and 21. Estes moved to Chicago in 1881 where he continued to work in restaurants.

Estes began to work for the Pullman Company in 1883. Throughout the course of his career he managed private Pullman cars for Benjamin Harrison, Grover Cleveland, the Princess Infanta Eulalia of Spain, Sir Henry Morton Stanley, Ignace Jan Paderewski and others. These private cars, also known as "Palace Cars", were elaborately decorated in the style of the Gilded Age with chandeliers, air conditions and beds, where gourmet meals were served by former slaves.

Between 1894 and 1897, probably related to the Pullman strike of 1894, Estes took another job aboard the RMS Empress of China, sailing from Vancouver to Tokyo. He made the decision to leave Pullman, ending his employment with the company in 1897, and taking a new job managing a luxury private railway car for Arthur Stillwell. In 1907 he took employment with the Chicago subsidiaries of the United States Steel Corporation.

His recipe book Good Things to Eat, as Suggested by Rufus: A Collection Of Practical Recipes For Preparing Meats, Game, Fowl, Fish, Puddings, Pastries, Etc. of over 600 recipes was published in 1911. Estes wanted to be recognized both as an accomplished professional chef and a former slave. It's among the first cookbooks written by an African-American chef (Robert Roberts, Malinda Russell and Abby Fisher wrote earlier cookbooks).
