= Joe Randall =

American chef (1946–2026)

- Born: Joseph Monroe Glascoe; July 23, 1946; McKeesport, Pennsylvania, U.S.
- Died: February 14, 2026 (aged 79); Savannah, Georgia, U.S.
- Occupations: Chef, educator, cookbook author
- Children: 3
- Awards: 2023 James Beard Foundation Cookbook Hall of Fame
- Website: https://chefjoerandall.com/

Joe Randall (July 23, 1946 – February 14, 2026) was an American chef, educator, and cookbook author, who specialized in African American cuisine.

== Early life ==
Joe Randall was born Joseph Monroe Glascoe on July 23, 1946, in McKeesport, Pennsylvania. When he was a child, he was adopted by his aunt and uncle. His adoptive uncle Joseph A. Randall was a doctor. Randall was raised in Harrisburg, Pennsylvania where he attended William Penn High School. In the summertime, he worked at a restaurant owned by his uncle Richard Ross in the Pittsburgh area. After high school, he joined the United States Air Force. He worked as a cook at a base outside of Albany, Georgia where he was first directly exposed to Southern cuisine.

== Career ==
In 1964, Randall returned to Pennsylvania. He worked in restaurants in the Harrisburg area. While working at the Harrisburger Hotel, Robert W. Lee, an African American executive chef and transplant from Atlanta, Georgia, became Randall’s mentor. Chef Frank E. Castelli also graciously gave Randall a shot at an apprenticeship at the Penn Harris Hotel in later years.

Randall later received restaurant management certificates from the University of California, Berkeley, and the University of California, Davis.

Randall cooked in over a dozen establishments across the country, including The Cloister in Buffalo, New York, The Fishmarket in Baltimore, Maryland and Georgia in Los Angeles, California.

He also taught at several institutions, including the Fremont School for Adults, American River College, Baltimore Culinary College, Cheyney University and California State Polytechnic University, Pomona.

In 1989, Randall opened the Restaurant at Kellogg Ranch, a training restaurant at California State Polytechnic University, Pomona, as part of its Collins College of Hospitality Management.

In 1994, Randall founded the Taste of Heritage Foundation, to widen the audience for African American cuisine.

In 1998, Randall authored A Taste of Heritage: The New African American Cuisine, with Toni Tipton-Martin. In 2023, the cookbook was inducted into the James Beard Foundation's Cookbook Hall of Fame. The book went beyond the limits of African and soul food, and introduced non-traditional pairings of ingredients and other cuisines (including French, Caribbean, and Latin).

In 1999, when Randall was visiting Savannah, Georgia, the president of the Savannah College of Art and Design asked him to cook dinner for her. She was so impressed with his cooking, that she hired him to run the food services of the college.

Later, Randall began offering recreational cooking classes at a kitchen appliance store in Savannah, something that he long dreamed of. The school was so successful that in 2000, he settled on a new location which became “Chef Joe Randall’s Cooking School.”

In 2012, he founded the Edna Lewis Foundation and in 2016, Randall’s contributions to African American culinary history were recognized nationally. Artifacts and materials related to his work were included in the Smithsonian Institution's National Museum of African American History and Culture in Washington, D.C., cementing his role in shaping the narrative of Black foodways, alongside chefs Edna Lewis, Patrick Clark (chef), Leah Chase and Hercules Posey.

In 2021, he was honored with the Chef Darryl Evans Milestone Award, recognizing his leadership, mentorship and lasting impact on the culinary profession.

Randall died of natural causes on February 14, 2026, at his home in Savannah, Georgia. He is survived by his wife, their three children and a grandson.
