= Daddy (Sammy Kaye song) =

"Daddy (Papito)"

Single by Sammy Kaye
- A-side: "Daddy"
- B-side: "Two Hearts That Pass in the Night"
- Released: April 25, 1941
- Recorded: March 31, 1941
- Genre: Big band, swing, jazz
- Length: 2:57
- Label: RCA Victor
- Songwriter: Bobby Troup

"Daddy (Papito)" is a popular 1941 song composed by songwriter Bobby Troup. It was first recorded and released by Sammy Kaye, using the band name "Swing and Sway with Sammy Kaye", with vocals by The Kaye Choir. The single hit number one in the Billboard on June 21, 1941, and held that spot for a total of eight weeks.

== Background ==
The song was composed by Bobby Troup, a member of the Mask and Wig Club at the University of Pennsylvania, and was originally written for one of the Club's shows.

The lyrics are on the theme of a woman named Daisy who entreats her lover or husband to buy her fashionable luxury goods.

Sammy Kaye recorded the song on March 31, 1941 and released it as an A side 78 single in 1941 on RCA Victor Records as 27391-A. The B side was "Two Hearts That Pass in the Night". Glenn Miller and his Orchestra also performed the song for radio broadcast the same year. Harry James also recorded a version in 1941 on Columbia 36171.

== Album appearances ==
The song appears on the following album collections: Various Artists: The Best of the Big Bands Sampler, Columbia, 1990, America Swings: The Great Sammy Kaye, Hindsight, 1993, Various Artists: Swing Years, Vol. 1-2, Sony Music Distribution, 1994, Songs that Won the War, Vol. 8: Swing Again, Yes Indeed, Delta Distribution, 1995, Best of Big Band 1941, BMG Special Products, 1997, and Number 1 Greatest Hits, RCA Victor, 1995.

== Other recordings ==
Connie Russell sung the song in the short film Red Hot Riding Hood. Bobby Troup released his recording of the song in 1957. Troup's wife Julie London also recorded the song in 1958 for her album Julie. Other recordings of the song were by Joan Merrill, Frankie Masters and His Orchestra, Sallie Blair in 1958, Dori Anne Gray, Nicolette Larson in 1979, Joanie Sommers with The Bobby Troup Sextet, Mary Stahl, Danielle Westphal, Julie Anne August, and Deborah Shulman and The Ted Howe Trio.
