= Juke Joints, Jazz Clubs, and Juice: Cocktails from Two Centuries of African American Cookbooks =

Juke Joints, Jazz Clubs, and Juice: Cocktails from Two Centuries of African American Cookbooks is a 2023 cookbook by Toni Tipton-Martin. It is a followup volume to her Jubilee: Recipes from Two Centuries of African American Cooking, which won the 2020 James Beard Award for Best American Cookbook, and The Jemima Code: Two Centuries of African American Cookbooks, which won the 2016 Beard Award for Reference and Scholarship.

== Development ==
The book was researched from Tipton-Martin's collection of approximately 300 cookbooks written by African-Americans, some dating to the early 1800s, which she also used to research two previous books including Jubilee, which won the 2020 James Beard Award for Best American Cookbook, and The Jemima Code: Two Centuries of African American Cookbooks, which won the 2016 Beard Award for Reference and Scholarship. Cookbooks she used for her research included Atholene Peyton's 1906 Peytonia Cook Book, Tom Bullock's 1917 The Ideal Bartender, and Julian Anderson's 1919 Julian's Recipes.

== Description ==
The book focuses on how African American mixologists influenced American cocktail culture and discusses the history of juke joints. It discusses how various cocktails evolved over time.

Tipton-Martin noted that there are few cookbooks by African Americans that focus on cocktails, wine, beer, and liquor because there was a social stigma attached to alcohol consumption by Black people. Tipton told KQED that "when Black people are portrayed in relation to spirits, they’re associated with debauchery — violent Black men, wild Black women, people wasting their money"; as a result, Black cookbook writers tended to avoid focusing on alcoholic beverages in order to maintain their reputation for competence and expertise.

The book discusses juke joints in particular as having been seen and commonly portrayed as places where drunken Black people got into fights and lost their week's wages gambling. According to Korsha Wilson, writing for Bon Appetit, these portrayals extended to those by Black writers, including Alice Walker's The Color Purple, which includes a scene in which the juke joint is seen as a "hot and sweaty space"; the scene ends with a fight. Juke Joints, Jazz Clubs, and Juice explores the juke joint as a cultural lifeline for American Black people, the juke joint's evolution into nightclubs, and the stereotypes that accompanied their establishment and development.

== Reception ==
Jessica B. Harris said that what Tipton-Martin had done with the book "is essentially create a mixologist’s parallel to what she did in ‘Jubilee' ", Tipton-Martin's 2019 cookbook exploring the history of African American professional cooking. According to Harris, Jubilee and Juke Joints, Jazz Clubs, and Juice together form "a diptych of the food of African Americans, as revealed through their cookbooks". VinePair said it continued Jubilee's "journey through the lens of drinks and the Black bartenders who have helped pave the nation’s cocktail culture". Publishers Weekly called it "enlightening and appealing volume".
