= John Martin Taylor =

American food writer and historian

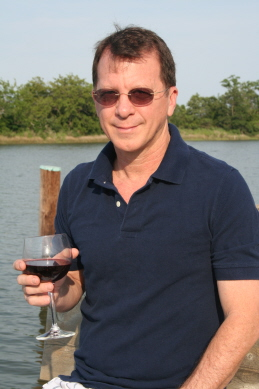
- Born: Louisiana, U.S.
- Occupations: Food writer, historian
- Notable work: Hoppin' John's Lowcountry Cooking, The New Southern Cook, The Fearless Frying Cookbook

John Martin Taylor, also known as Hoppin' John, is an American food writer and culinary historian, known for his writing on the cooking of the American South, and, in particular, the foods of the lowcountry, the coastal plain of South Carolina and Georgia. He has played a role in reintroducing many traditional southern dishes, and has advocated the return to stone-ground, whole-grain, heirloom grits and cornmeal production.

== Early years ==
Taylor was born in Louisiana, moving to the South Carolina Lowcountry when he was 3. The son of scientists, he spent much of his youth aboard the family's boats. His mother was an adventurous cook and cookbook collector and his father was a wine lover. He received a B.A. in journalism from the University of Georgia (UGA) in 1971. In 1977 he earned a Master of Arts in Film, also from UGA.

From the late 1970s to the early 1980s, Taylor lived in the Caribbean, Paris, and Genoa. In 1983 he joined the staff of the new French-language magazine, Ici New York, as their American liaison and food editor. He has written for such publications as The New York Times, Gourmet, Bon Appétit, Food & Wine and The Washington Post.

== Bookstore ==
In 1986, Taylor opened his culinary bookstore, Hoppin' John's, in downtown Charleston, South Carolina. He had begun researching the culinary history of the area after interviewing the scholar Karen Hess on the history of Thanksgiving. In 1989, Hurricane Hugo hit Charleston. Taylor wrote his first book during the year that his business was closed for repairs. He was involved in forming the downtown farmers’ market in Charleston, where he sold stone-ground grits and cornmeal. When he reopened the store, he expanded it to include a cooking school. He closed the storefront in 1999, but continued to sell his corn products online at his eponymous website, HoppinJohns.com. In 2019, he sold the business to his niece, Sarah Taylor Ferrell, of Durham, North Carolina.

== Cookbooks ==
Hoppin' John's Lowcountry Cooking (1992), Taylor's first book, was included in a roundup of "intellectual" food books by The New York Times in 1992. Southern Living Magazine called the cookbook "scholarly". It was included in a roundup of "intellectual" food books by The New York Times in 1992.

His second book, The New Southern Cook, was included in a roundup of Southern classics by The New York Times in 1995.

The New York Times Magazine called The Fearless Frying Cookbook "extremely user-friendly" and that it would "eventually become the bible on the topic". He was a founding member of the Southern Foodways Alliance.

Other books he has written include Hoppin’ John’s Charleston, Beaufort & Savannah (1997), which featured Taylor's photography as well as his history and recipes.

Gourmet Magazine has featured Taylor since the 1980s. Taylor writes about food and travel on his blog,. He is a consultant to the food industry and a speaker at U.S. museums and symposia. In 2010, he spoke at the Historic New Orleans Foundation, Monticello, and the Smithsonian. He was the keynote speaker at the International Corporate Chefs Association and grand marshal of the Pig Island Celebration in New York.

In 2012, the University of North Carolina Press published the 20th Anniversary Edition of Hoppin’ John's Lowcountry Cooking, with a new preface by Taylor. The book has remained in print since its initial publication.

in 2018, in preparation to move overseas again, Taylor donated his culinary library to the International Culinary Institute of Myrtle Beach and his papers to the College of Charleston. He was also awarded the Amelia Award by the Culinary Historians of New York for expertise "in culinary history, with deep knowledge in the field. And ... for a having "demonstrated generosity and extraordinary support to others in the field, helping to shape and elevate culinary history into the academically-respected discipline that it is today."

In 2022, Taylor wrote the Foreword to a new edition of Karen Hess's The Carolina Rice Kitchen: The African Connection, and the University of South Carolina Press published an anthology of 35 years of his writing.

== Personal life ==
In 2010, he married his longtime partner, Mikel Lane Herrington, in Washington, DC. In 2011, the couple moved to Sofia, Bulgaria, where Herrington was the Peace Corps Country Director. In 2013, Taylor and Herrington moved to Chengdu, China, where Herrington was Peace Corps Country Director. From 2015 to 2019, they split their time between Savannah, Georgia, and Washington.

In 2019, Taylor moved to Phnom Penh, Cambodia, where Herrington was the Peace Corps Country Director. In 2023, they moved to Hanoi, Vietnam, where Herrington was the Peace Corps Country Director of the new mission there. Herrington retired in December 2024 and the couple moved to Athens, Georgia, where Taylor attended both undergraduate and graduate school. https://hoppinjohns.net/?p=246

== Works ==
- Charleston to Phnom Penh: A Cook's Journal (2022, ISBN 9781643363509)
- Foreword to The Carolina Rice Kitchen: The African Connection, Second Edition (2022, ISBN 9781643363400)
- Hoppin' John's Lowcountry Cooking: Recipes and Ruminations from Charleston & the Carolina Coastal Plain (1992, ISBN 0553082310)
- The New Southern Cook: 200 Recipes from the South's Best Chefs and Home Cooks (1995, ISBN 9780553378061)
- Hoppin' John's Charleston, Beaufort & Savannah (1997, ISBN 9780517703878)
- Hoppin' John's Lowcountry Cooking: Recipes and Ruminations from Charleston & the Carolina Coastal Plain (20th Anniversary edition) (2012, ISBN 9780807837573)
- The Fearless Frying Cookbook (2013, ISBN 9780761172000)
- Deep-Fried Goodness (2013, ISBN 9780761179733)
