= Michael W. Twitty =

American historian

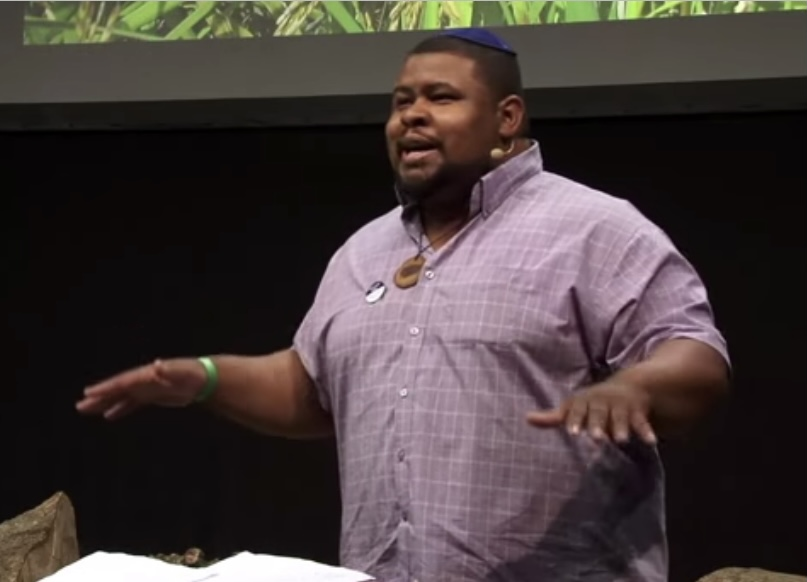
- Michael Twitty speaking in 2013
- Born: 1977 (age 48–49); Washington, D.C., U.S.
- Occupations: Author, culinary historian, historical interpreter
- Notable work: The Cooking Gene

Michael W. Twitty (born 1977) is an African-American Jewish writer, culinary historian, and educator. He is the author of The Cooking Gene, published by HarperCollins/Amistad, which won the 2018 James Beard Foundation Book Award for Book of the Year as well as the category for writing.

== Early life and education ==
Michael Twitty: "Southern Discomfort – Confronting Culinary Injustice" at MAD, August 2013.

Twitty was born in Washington, D.C., in 1977 to William Lee Twitty and Patricia Anita Townsend. He is of Mende, Akan and Irish descent. His Irish ancestors were enslavers; Twitty wrote an article for the Guardian explaining how he discovered his Irish ancestry through a combination of genetic testing and historical records. Twitty's great-great-grandfather, Elijah Mitchell, was on a nearby street when Robert E. Lee surrendered to Ulysses S. Grant at the Appomattox Court House, ending the American Civil War.

Twitty first became interested in traditional cooking as a child when he went on a trip to Colonial Williamsburg. He majored in African-American studies and anthropology at Howard University, but did not finish due to financial constraints. Twitty went on a birthright trip to Israel in 2004.

== Career ==
In 2010, Twitty launched Afroculinaria, a culinary history blog that covers African and African-American foodways. In 2010, Twitty worked with the D. Landreth Seed Company to compile the African American Heritage Collection of heirloom seeds for the company's 225th anniversary. The collection features roughly 30 plants, including the long-handled dipper gourd and the fish pepper, showcasing how instrumental they were to African-American survival and independence. In 2011, he began his "Cooking Gene" project, which would form the basis for his 2017 book The Cooking Gene. His second book, Koshersoul, was published in 2022.

Twitty founded and oversees the Southern Discomfort Tour, a journey through the American South designed to raise awareness about the impact racism had on Southern cuisine. As part of this project, Twitty recreates the experiences of his enslaved ancestors, picking cotton, chopping wood, working in fields, and cooking in plantation kitchens.

In 2013, Twitty gained greater media attention when he published an open letter to Paula Deen after she was fired from the Food Network. That same year he spoke at the MAD symposium in Copenhagen after being invited by Rene Redzepi, owner of NOMA. In 2016, he traveled to Vancouver to give a TED talk entitled "Gastronomy and the social justice reality of food". In 2016, Twitty received the inaugural Culinary Pioneer Award from Tastetalks and won both readers choice and editors choice for his letter to chef Sean Brock on Afroculinaria from Saveur. In January 2017, Colonial Williamsburg named Twitty its first Revolutionary in Residence.

In January 2023 airing of The African Americans: Many Rivers to Cross, Twitty is interviewed by the creator of the series, Henry Louis Gates.

In 2025, his cookbook Recipes From the American South, was published by Phaidon Press.

== Personal life ==
Twitty is openly gay. He was raised nominally Christian and converted to Judaism at age 25.
