= Lowcountry cuisine =

Ethnic culinary tradition in coastal Georgia and South Carolina

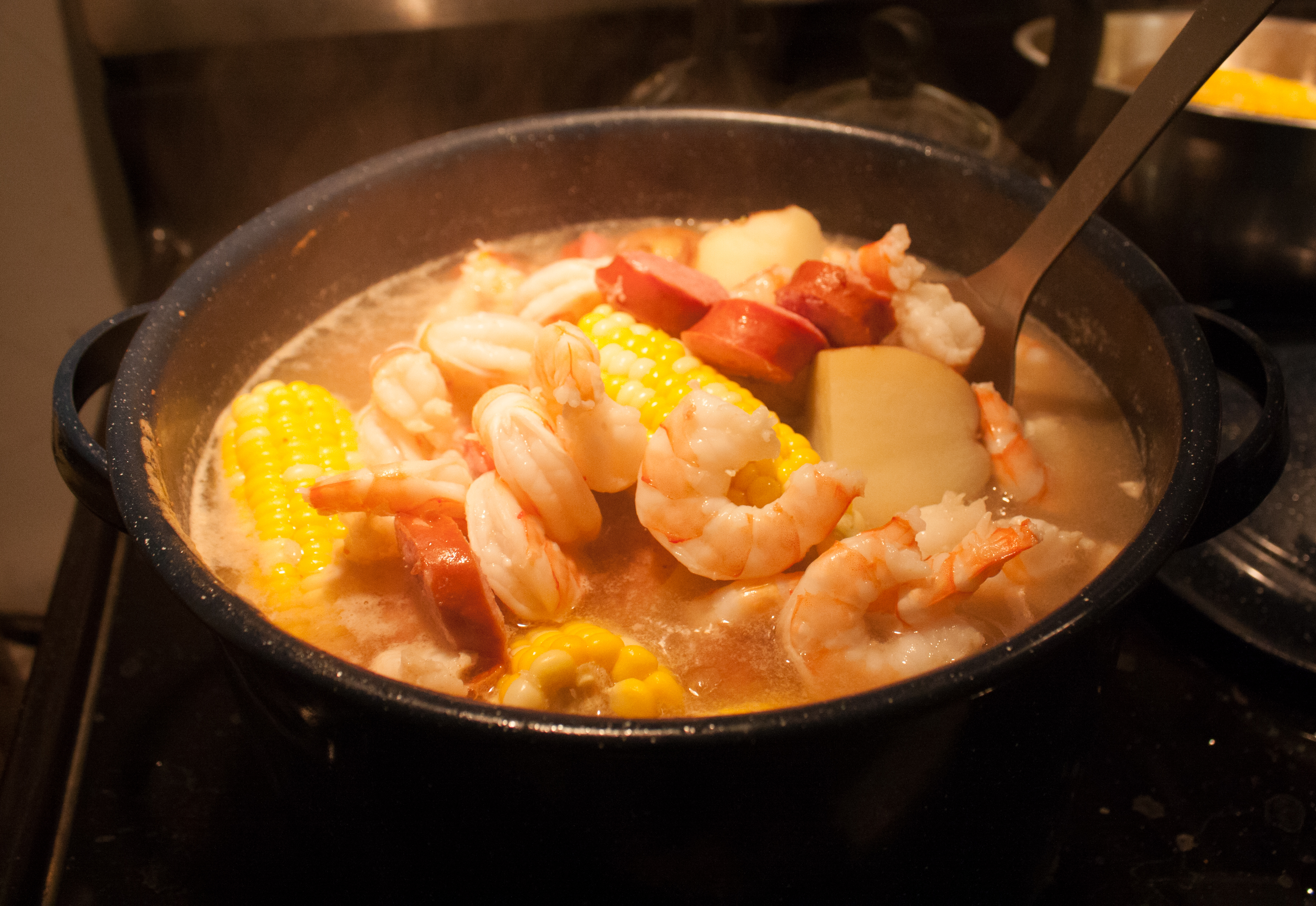
Frogmore Stew

Lowcountry cuisine is the cooking traditionally associated with the South Carolina Lowcountry and the Georgian coast. While it shares features with Southern cooking, its geography, economics, demographics, and culture pushed its culinary identity in a different direction from regions above the Fall Line.

== Description ==
With its diversity of seafood from the coastal estuaries, its concentration of wealth in Charleston and Savannah, and a vibrant African cuisine influence, Lowcountry cooking has strong parallels with New Orleans and Cajun cuisine.

The lowcountry includes the coastal regions of South Carolina and Georgia. There is a difference of opinion as to what exactly the South Carolina Lowcountry encompasses. The term is most frequently used to describe the coastal area of South Carolina that stretches from Pawleys Island, South Carolina to the confluence of the Savannah River at the Georgia state line. More generous accounts argue that the region extends further north and west, including all of the Atlantic coastal plain of South Carolina and Georgia. The geography is a critical factor in distinguishing the region's culinary identity from interior areas of the South.

The rich estuary system provides an abundance of shrimp, fish, crabs, and oysters that were not available to non-coastal regions prior to refrigeration. The marshlands of South Carolina also proved conducive to growing rice, and grain became a major part of the everyday diet.

== Foods that are traditionally part of Lowcountry cuisine ==
=== Appetizers, soups, and salads ===
- Cooter soup (Turtle soup)
- She-crab soup
- Sweet potato and crab soup
- Gumbo
- Brunswick stew

=== Meat and seafood ===
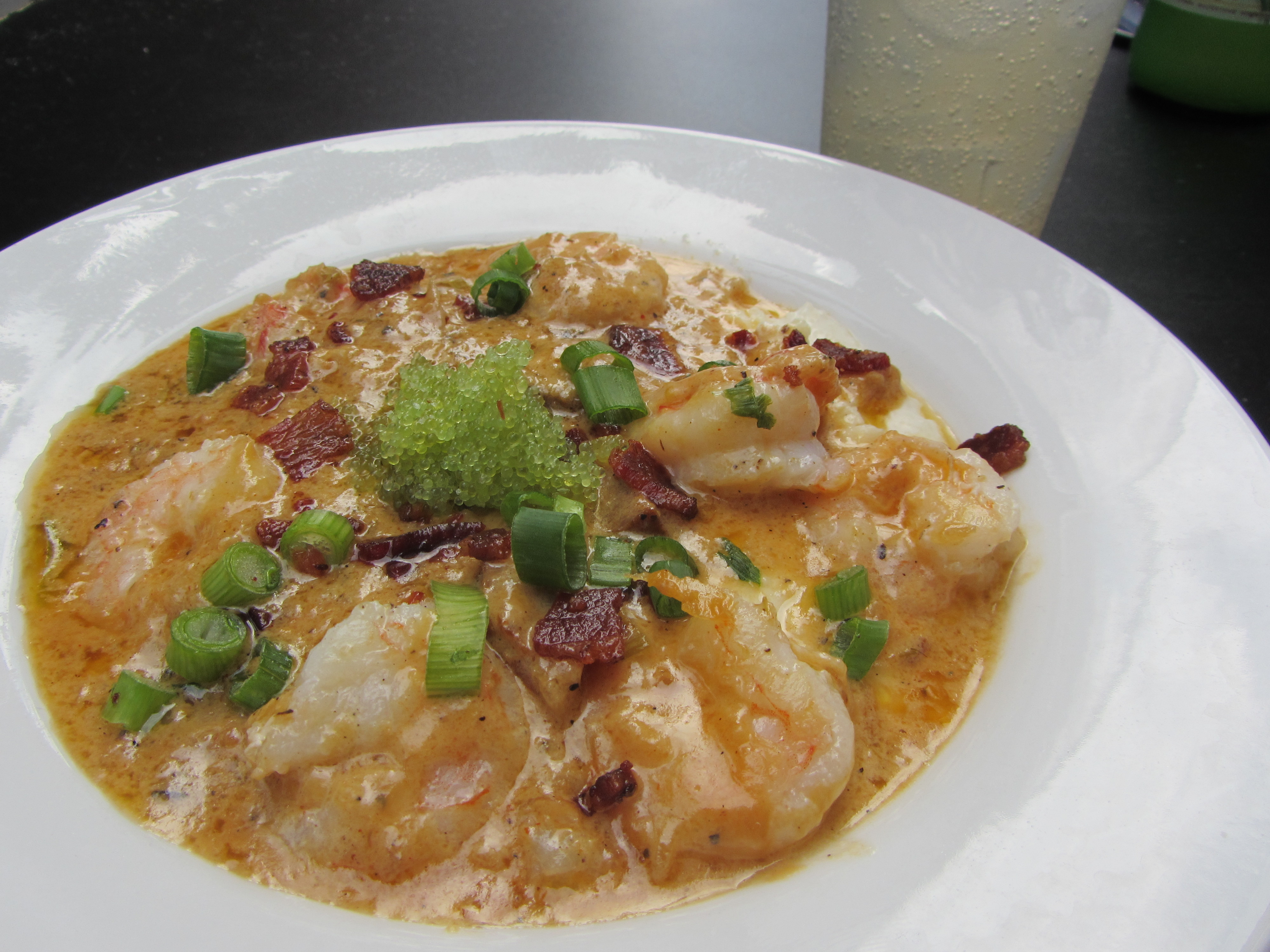
Shrimp and grits at a Charleston restaurant

- Catfish stew
- Lowcountry boil (known as "Frogmore stew" in South Carolina)
- Country captain
- Shrimp and grits
- Shrimp kedgeree
- Oyster roast
- Crab cake

=== Rice ===
- Charleston red rice
- Perlau or chicken bog

=== Sides ===
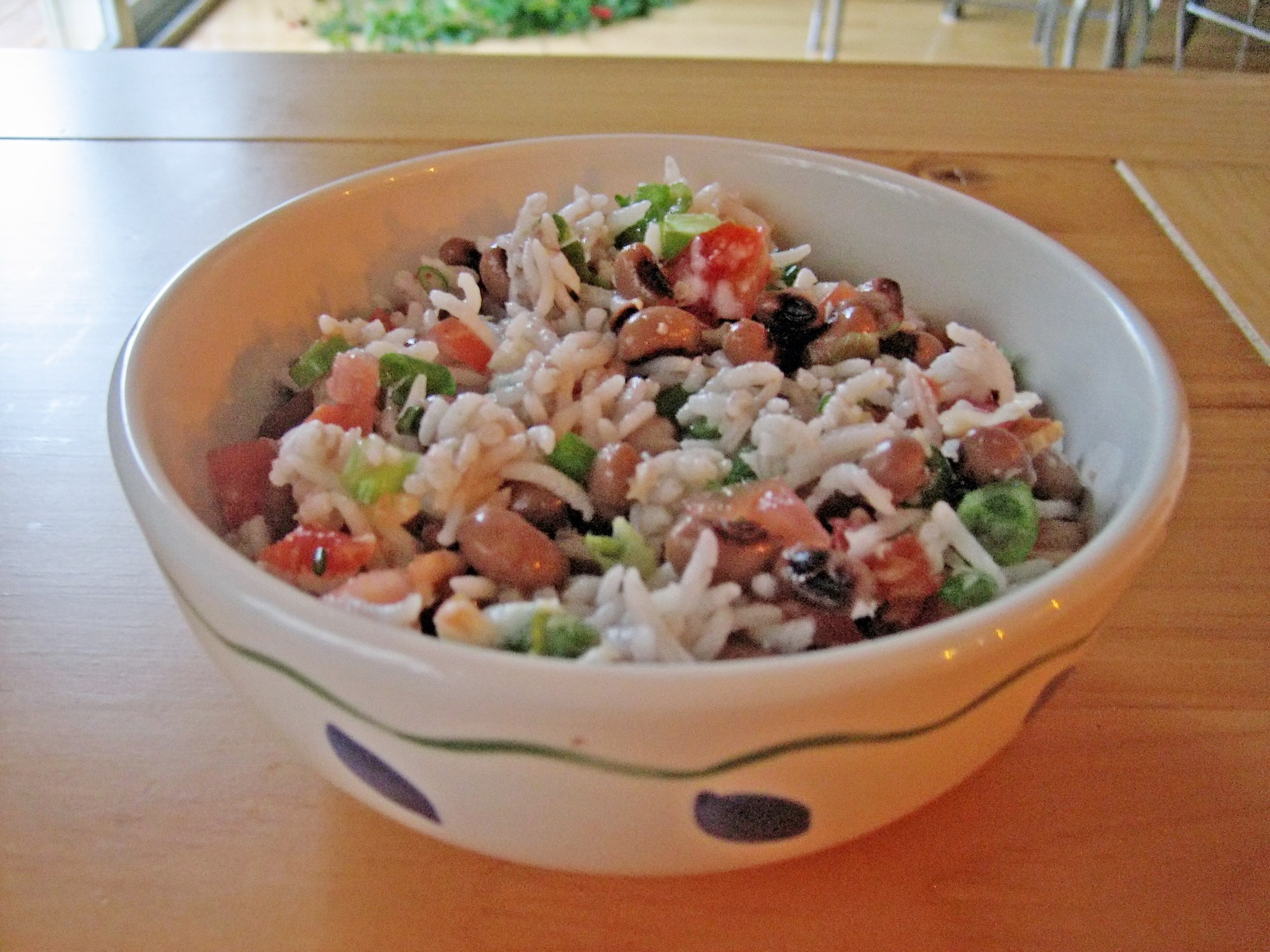
Hoppin' John

- Hoppin' John
- Fried cabbage
- Baked macaroni and cheese

== See also ==
- Cuisine of the Southern United States
- Vertamae Grosvenor
- Marsh Hen Mill, in South Carolina, selling grits from heirloom grains and other local products
