= Picayune Creole Cookbook =

Black Louisiana Creole cookbook

Picayune's Creole Cookbook
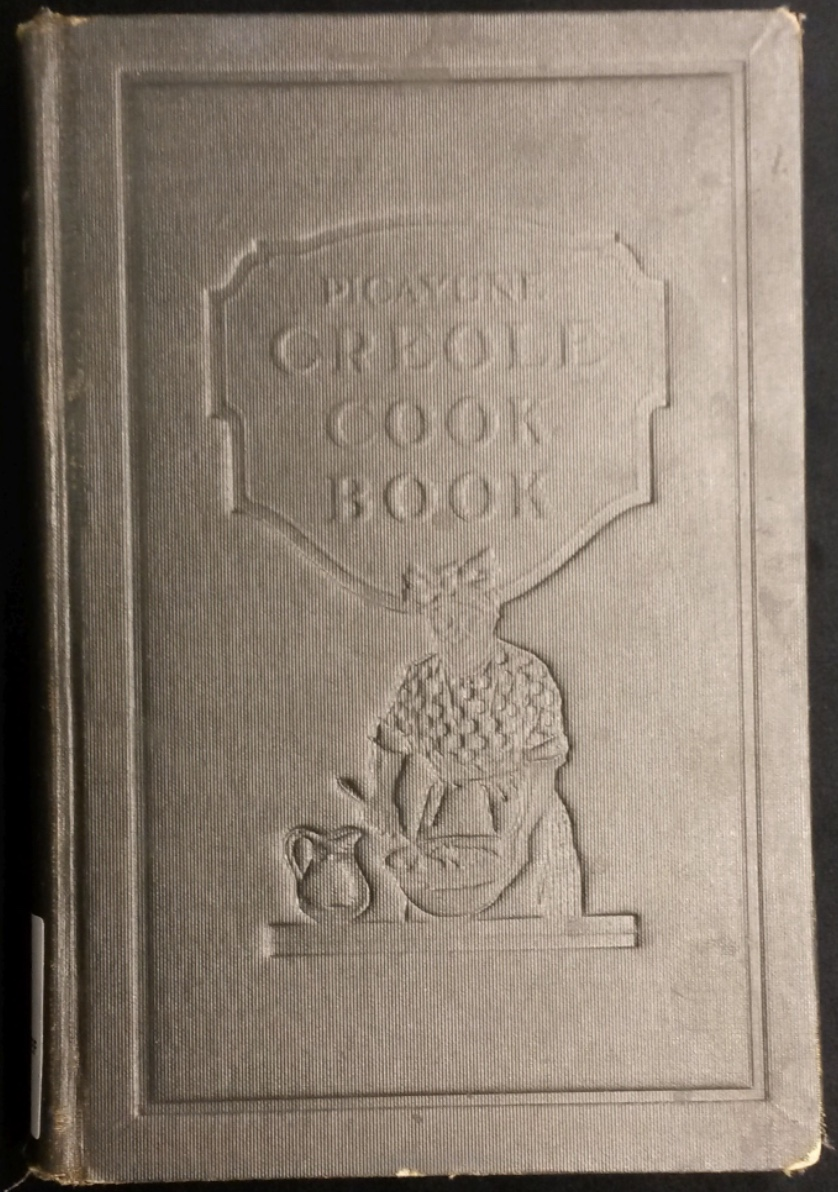
- The embossed cover of the Picayune's Creole Cookbook.
- Language: English
- Subject: Creole and soul food
- Genre: Cookbook
- Publisher: The Times-Picayune
- Publication date: 1900; 126 years ago
- Publication place: United States
- Media type: Print
- Pages: 277

Picayune's Creole Cookbook (also known as the Times-Picayune Creole Cookbook) was a cookbook first published in 1900 by the Picayune newspaper in New Orleans. The book contains recipes contributed by white women who had collected them from Black cooks who had created or learned the recipes while enslaved. Recipes represented were developed from the late 18th through the early 20th centuries.

The introduction to the original edition explains that the recipes were collected from Tantes (aunts), or older Black Creole women, and that the book was needed because white New Orleans society had lost access to the recipes when slavery ended.

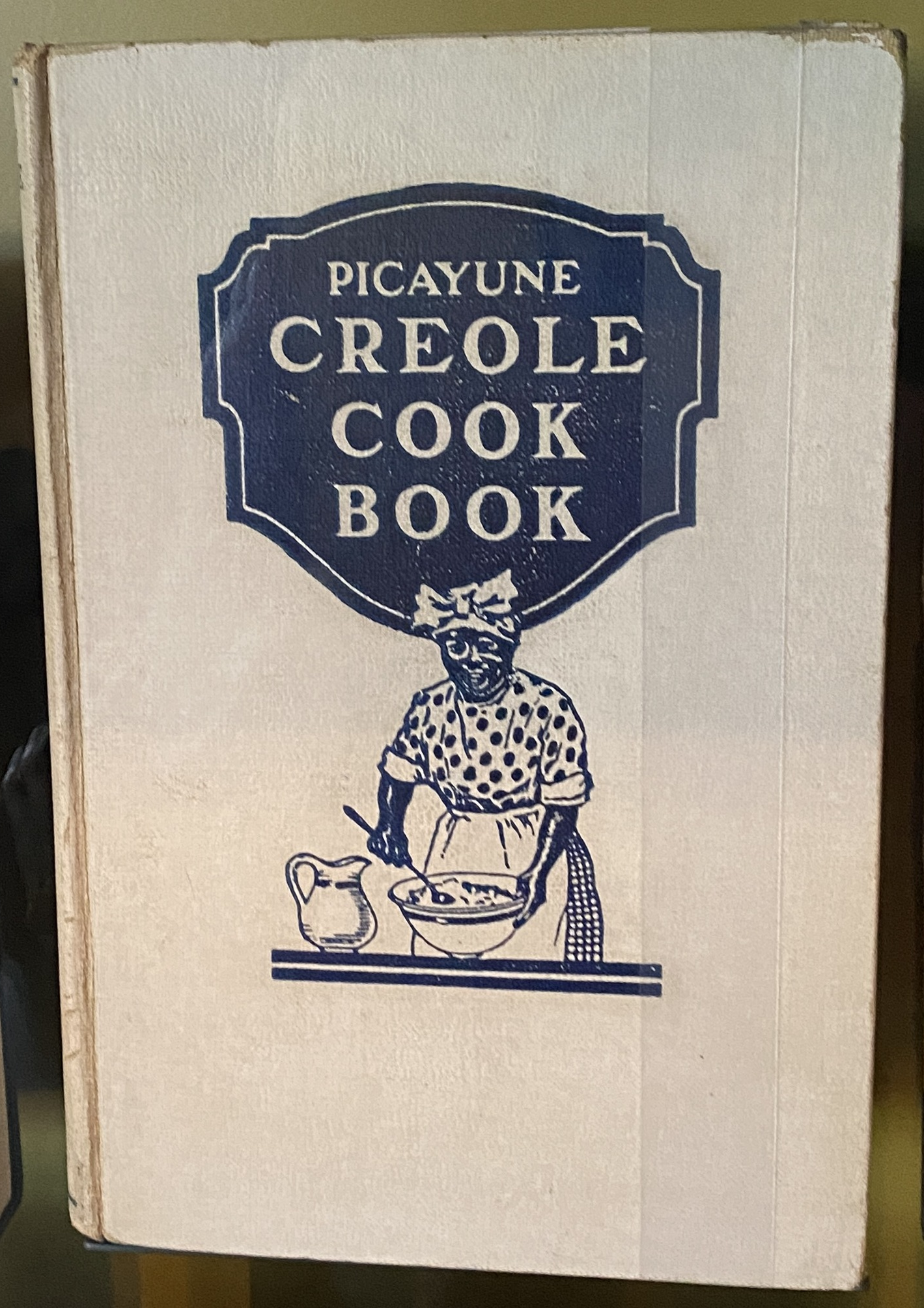
Cookbook in the collection of the National Museum of African American History and Culture

Time was when the question of a Creole Cook Book would have been, as far as New Orleans is concerned, as useless an addition to our local literature as it is now a necessity, for the Creole negro cooks of nearly two hundred years ago, carefully instructed and directed by their white Creole mistresses, who received their inheritance of gastronomic lore from France, where the art of good cooking first had birth, faithfully transmitted their knowledge to their progeny...But the civil war, with its vast upheavals of social conditions, wrought great changes in the household economy of New Orleans, as it did throughout the South; here, as everywhere, she who had ruled as the mistress of yesterday became her own cook of to-day...the ‘bandana and tignon’ are fast disappearing from our kitchens. Soon will the last of the olden negro cooks of ante-bellum days have passed away and their places will not be supplied.

According to Michigan State University, along with Lafcadio Hearn's La Cuisine Creole, the book is considered among the best sources of authentic Creole recipes.

== Publication history ==
The original cookbook was published in 1900, with subsequent editions released in 1901, 1906, 1916, 1922, 1928, 1936, 1938, 1942, 1945, 1947, 1954, 1966 and 1971. In 1987 a revised edition with photography by Wendi Schneider was released in celebration of the newspaper's sesquicentennial.
