= Alice McGill =

American writer

Alice McGill is an American children's writer and professional storyteller. Many of her books have African American protagonists or deal with African American issues. Molly Bannaky, the story of a young British girl in 17th century America who became the grandmother of Benjamin Banneker, the first black man to publish an almanac, was an ALA Notable Book and winner of the 2000 IRA Picture Book Award and the 2000 Jane Addams Award.

== Biography ==
McGill was born in the small rural town of Scotland Neck, North Carolina, where she attended a four-room school. She was strongly influenced by her parents, both of whom were readers and storytellers. She was awarded a four-year scholarship to Elizabeth City State Teacher's College, where she earned a degree in elementary education. She taught school for many years before becoming a full-time, traveling storyteller.

Her storytelling research has taken her to 41 states and Canada, as well as the West Indies and Africa, and she brings her repertoire of American, African, and African American folklore and folk traditions to libraries, classrooms and other venues around the country. One of her most well-known performances re-creates the life of Sojourner Truth; the story is based on Truth’s own writings on abolition, women’s rights, motherhood and other topics.

McGill, along with Mary Carter Smith and Elmira M. Washington, wrote 1985 The Griots' Cookbook.

McGill is married and lives in Columbia, Maryland.

== Selected works ==
- The Griots' Cookbook (1985)
- Molly Bannaky
- Miles' Song
- "Sure As Sunrise: Stories of Bruh Rabbit and his Walkin' Talkin' Friends"
- In the Hollow of Your Hand: Slave Lullabies
- Here We Go Round
