= The Cooking Gene =

Non-fiction book written by Michael W. Twitty

The Cooking Gene: A Journey through African American Culinary History in the Old South
- Author: Michael W. Twitty
- Language: English
- Genre: Memoir
- Published: 2017 (HarperCollins Publishers)
- Publication place: New York
- ISBN: 9780062379290

The Cooking Gene: A Journey Through African American Culinary History in the Old South is an American non-fiction book written by Michael W. Twitty. It was published in 2017 and is a food memoir. The author combines intensive genealogical and historical research as well as personal accounts to support the argument that the origin of southern cuisine is heavily based in the continent of Africa. The book was the recipient of the 2018 James Beard Foundation Book Award for Writing and Book of the Year.

== Background ==
Michael W. Twitty is Jewish and notes within The Cooking Gene that the documentation and history found within Jewish cuisine inspired him to write it. The book takes a look at the social ecology surrounding the cuisine traditionally done by African Americans in the southern US. In the book, topics such as genealogy, chattel slavery, sexuality, gender, and spirituality are discussed in addition to foodways. Twitty adds discussions surrounding Soul Food, African American foodways, and Southern Cuisine.

== Summary ==
The Cooking Gene is about the influence that the enslavement of Africans by European settlers has had on foodways and history of the Old South. The Cooking Gene includes personal narratives, history, recipes, and folk songs. The recipes have African, Native American, and European roots as the author integrates his Jewish faith into African-American cooking. Twitty emphasizes the African flair that has been added to European and Native American ingredients by African American cooks. Additionally, he discusses plants used in cooking that are native to Africa such as sesame, okra, and sorghum.

The author discusses how he did not enjoy traditional soul food recipes during his youth but began to accept his African American heritage as he learned to cook. Twitty's experiences growing up led to him to develop an interest in culinary arts. In The Cooking Gene, the author describes the methods that African Americans used to cook on plantations and travels to the south on what the author called the "Southern Discomfort Tour" to learn more about his family's history and to authentically reproduce meal preparation experiences that former enslaved Africans may have had. Twitty argues that techniques used in African American cooking food have an innate nature and this can be attributed to the supplies Africans and their descendants had available to them during meal preparation. This exploration of the culinary history seeks to raise awareness of diversity of ingredients that African Americans traditionally ate in the South.

The Cooking Gene also compares and contrasts Jewish and Black foodways, and discusses followers of Judaism in the south. Jewish and Black culinary traditions and items have mingled with each other both in the south and in northern cities. Twitty talks about his conversion to Judaism and expresses his fondness for Jewish cuisine.

== Reception ==
The Cooking Gene has received positive reception as it has received praise for both its prose as well as what reviewers saw as unique elements that Twitty ties into the book. The Chicago Tribune commented on the work, calling it "honest" and "lyrical." It has been named as one of NPR’s Best Books of 2017 and one of Smithsonian Magazine's Ten Best Books About Food in 2017.
