= Mary Carter Smith =

American educator and storyteller

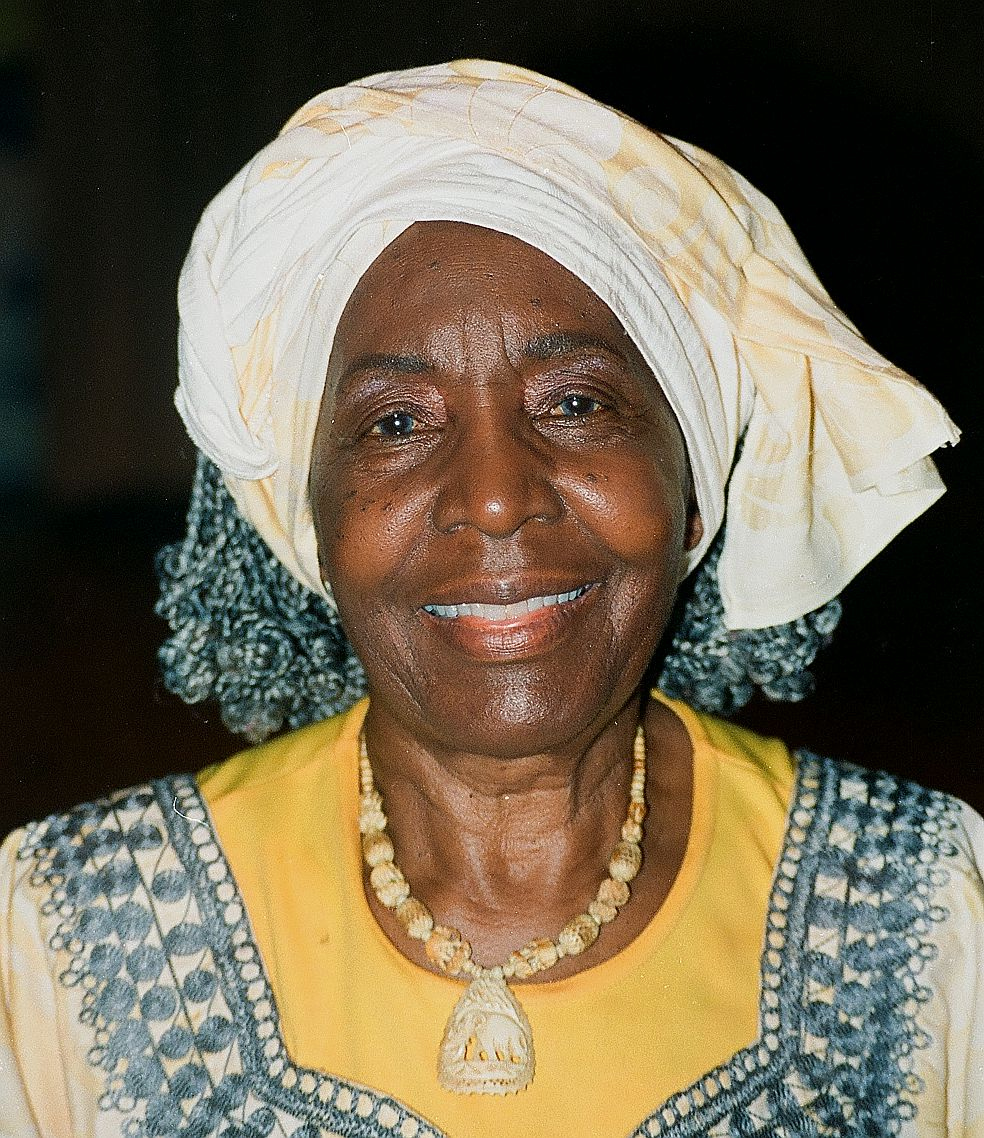
Mary Carter Smith in 1997

Mary Carter Smith (1919 – April 24, 2007) was a noted American educator who helped revive storytelling as an educational tool. She graduated from Coppin State University and was a teacher in the Baltimore City Public School system for thirty-one years. Additionally, she was a co-founder of Big Brothers-Big Sisters of Maryland, founding member of Big Brothers-Big Sisters of America, the Arena Players theatre company and the Griots' Circle of Maryland.

She hosted a Saturday morning radio program, "Griot for the Young and the Young at Heart" and, in 1983, Mary Smith was named the official Griot of Baltimore City and, in 1991, the official Griot of Maryland.

Smith, along with Alice McGill and Elmira M. Washington, wrote 1985 The Griots' Cookbook.

== Awards and notable achievements ==
- 1982: co-founded The National Association of Black Storytellers
- 1985: awarded the Zora Neale Hurston Award
- 1996: Lifetime Achievement Award and The Circle of Excellence Award from the National Storytelling Association
- Her image is featured at the National Great Blacks In Wax Museum in Baltimore, Maryland
