= Jubilee: Recipes from Two Centuries of African American Cooking =

2019 American cookbook

Jubilee
- First edition
- Author: Toni Tipton-Martin
- Language: English
- Publisher: Clarkson Potter
- Publication date: 2019
- Media type: Print (Hardback)
- ISBN: 978-1-524-76173-8

Jubilee: Recipes from Two Centuries of African American Cooking is a 2019 American cookbook by Toni Tipton-Martin. It won the 2020 James Beard Award for Best American Cookbook.

== Development ==
The book was researched from Tipton-Martin's collection of approximately 300 cookbooks written by African-Americans, some dating to the early 1800s. Recipes were selected from a list of nearly 400 African American dishes considered seminal by Afro-Puerto-Rican historian Arturo Schomburg. Tipton-Martin often used several iterations of a dish as it evolved through time in order to develop her modern interpretation. Tipton-Martin told Saveur, "if I could determine that a dish persisted into the 21st century, that became a way for me to evaluate its staying power as part of the canon". In some cases she used modern recipes that had already been developed by others to represent the modern interpretation of a historical recipe; one instance is the recipe for Caribbean Pork Roast, which was developed by Kelis.

== Description ==
The book is a compilation of approximately 100 modern interpretations of historical recipes, with discussion of the history of the recipes. Recipes include a side-by-side comparison of the historical recipes alongside Tipton-Martin's modern interpretation of those recipes. It was photographed by Jerrelle Guy, author of Black Girl Baking and the blog Chocolate for Basil. Kathleen Purvis, writing for Garden & Gun, described it as "lushly photographed and richly researched".

== Reception ==
Jesse Sparks, writing for Bon Appétit, describes the book as at first glance appearing "so rigid, so cold...so quiet" but that her first glance missed "what a wild party Jubilee actually is" in the connections it makes between historical recipes and modern Black lifestyles. Dalia Colon, writing for NPR, said the book's " goal is to break down stereotypes and give black chefs past and present", including enslaved chefs heading plantation kitchens and emancipated people running restaurants, appropriate recognition for their work. Latifah Miles, writing for New York Magazine, said "the most delightful part of Jubilee is the interwoven history. From the origin stories of specific African and Caribbean dishes handed down through centuries to excerpts of recipes dating as far back as 1881, Tipton-Martin’s work is as much a cookbook as it is an exhibition of the prismatic heritage of Black culture".

The book received the James Beard Award for American Cooking in 2020. It was Tipton-Martin's second James Beard Award for one of her books after 2016's The Jemima Code. Jubilee also won the International Association of Culinary Professionals American Cookbook of the Year.

== See also ==
- Juke Joints, Jazz Clubs, and Juice: Cocktails from Two Centuries of African American Cookbooks
