= Robert Roberts (butler) =

Robert Roberts (c. 1780 in Charleston, South Carolina–1860) was the author of The House Servant's Directory: A Monitor for Private Families. Published in 1827, the book was the first commercially published book written by an African American in the United States. His intent in writing this was to teach the "general rules and directions for servants to go by as shall give satisfaction to their employers, and gain a good reputation for themselves." The book was sufficiently popular that two later editions were printed.

Roberts married Dorothy Hall in 1805. They had no children, and Dorothy died of tuberculosis in 1813. Later in 1813 he married Sarah Easton. They had twelve children.

He was a butler or manservant for Nathan Appleton and it is likely that Roberts traveled abroad with Appleton from 1810 to 1812. In 1825 he became the butler for Christopher Gore, Governor and Senator from Massachusetts, and remained in the position until Gore's death in 1827.

Later in life he was known in Boston as an abolitionist and for his efforts to secure equal school rights.
