= Freda DeKnight =

Editor and author

- Born: Freda Alexander; December 20, 1909 near Topeka, Kansas, United States
- Died: January 30, 1963; New York City, United States
- Occupations: Editor, author

Freda DeKnight (1909–1963) was the first food editor of Ebony magazine and the author of A Date With A Dish: A Cookbook of American Negro Recipes, considered the first major cookbook written by an African-American for an African-American audience. She was a pioneer for the working class, who was able to articulate an unmatched love of food. DeKnight's legacy lives on through the continued use of her cookbook.

== Early life ==
Freda Alexander was born in December 1909 while her mother, Elenore Alexander, a nurse from Boston, was traveling near Topeka, Kansas. Two years later her father, who was a steward on the Santa Fe Railroad, died, so her mother, a traveling nurse, sent Freda and her sister to live with a South Dakota farming family. The Scotts not only raised livestock and crops, but they also ran the most successful catering business in the area. Freda soon developed a passionate interest in cooking, which was nurtured by her adoptive family. DeKnight later recalled that the Scotts “were the inspiration for my early cooking aspirations, which gave me every opportunity to absorb all their fine recipes and rudiments of cooking, preparing food, and catering. Although Mama Scott’s education was limited, she could measure and estimate to perfection without any modern aids.” Later on, DeKnight would turn her love for cooking into a living. After she studied home economics at Dakota Wesleyan University, she moved to New York on a whim and began her tenure at Ebony in 1944.

== Career ==
After college, Freda DeKnight traveled to New York, where she attended classes at Columbia University and New York University. She also worked teaching sewing and as a guidance counselor to vocational training schools in Manhattan including Yorkville High School, where she met René DeKnight, the arranger and pianist for The Delta Rhythm Boys who would become her husband in 1940. In 1946, DeKnight took a position as food editor for Ebony magazine, making her the first African-American food editor in the United States. The story goes that DeKnight prepared a meal at which publisher John H. Johnson was present, and she impressed him by sending the menu he requested after greatly enjoying the meal to him in a creative, narrative style that made it seem fun to cook. She continued to use this creativity in her column, with formats such as cooking directions appearing as photo captions. DeKnight published a regular column in the magazine called “A Date with a Dish.” Her husband, noted jazz pianist Rene DeKnight came up with the column's title. As the first food editor for Ebony magazine, DeKnight wrote a photo-driven monthly column that offered her home economist's tips, as well as regional recipes from the “Negro community” of home cooks, professional chefs, caterers, restaurateurs and celebrities

In 1948, DeKnight published her only cookbook, A Date with A Dish: A Cookbook of American Negro Recipes. It is considered the first major cookbook written by an African-American for an African-American audience. Through Ebony, DeKnight reminded readers of the multinational roots of Southern cooking and the ingenuity so often displayed in the cuisine, an ingenuity that transcended the poverty from which traditional Southern cooking had emerged.

According to Charlotte Lyons, an Ebony food editor, “Freda DeKnight was a pioneer in translating the Ebony message of middle-class education, intelligence and dignity to the recipes she shared in her columns and cookbook”.

DeKnight didn't limit her celebration of African-American culture to the culinary world. She rose to the position of home service director at Johnson Publishing, home of Ebony. And in 1957, she staged the first Ebony Fashion Fair, "stirring Negro culture" into international haute couture. She would oftentimes appear on television, demonstrating recipes like violet-petal cake, and scouted the country for models for the pages of Ebony.

In 1962, DeKnight's husband took her on a vacation-business trip to Hawaii and Japan where she selected fashions for the 1962 production of the Ebony Fashion Fair "The fashion Fair With An Oriental Flair."

== Date with a Dish: A Cookbook of American Negro Recipes ==
First edition of A Date With A Dish, Heritage Press, 1948

In 1948, DeKnight published her only cookbook, titled A Date with a Dish. Subsequent editions were branded as The Ebony Cookbook, but in 2014 the book was reissued with its original title.

This cookbook went beyond simply collecting DeKnight's columns and recipes. She traveled all over the country to conduct interviews and collect recipes, including celebrities like Duke Ellington and Louis Armstrong alongside respected African-American chefs and home cooks. Her efforts resulted in a 400-page “non-regional cookbook that contains recipes, menus, and cooking hints for and by Negroes all over America.”

DeKnight used a model that had long proven a favorite among home cooks; she presented an organized selection of explicit recipes, along with plenty of household hints. She suggested vegetable plates for spring and holiday menus. She gave directions for the humane preparation of lobster. And she wove vignettes into technical instructions. DeKnight shared notable moments from interviews with celebrities, as well as their favorite recipes, such as Louis Armstrong's beloved ham hocks and red beans.

“No need to make folks think I like fancy foods like quail on toast, chicken and hot biscuits, or steak smothered in mushrooms. Of course they taste good and I can eat them, but have you ever tried ham hocks and red beans?” -Louis Armstrong, as quoted in A Date with a Dish

Ultimately, DeKnight set her sights not on writing a great cookbook (though she did, and it became a bestseller). She strove to overturn stereotypes about African-American cooks and Southern cooking. She states in the preface of A Date with a Dish, “It is a fallacy, long disproved, that Negro cooks, chefs, caterers and homemakers can adapt themselves only to the standard Southern dishes….Like other Americans living in various sections of the country, they have naturally shown a desire to become versatile in the preparation of any dish.”

== Legacy ==
The Paris Review state that "DeKnight presented a more nuanced and often glamorous image of African-American cooking and culture—not just to African-American readers, but to the broader world.” DeKnight's efforts helped people across the country to see Southern cooking as phenomenon of cultural assimilation, and to see food as a potential means for climbing out of poverty. "This is probably my favorite book out of the entire collection. I feel that I have a professional relationship with De Knight because she represents the journalists who used their columns in magazines and newspapers to keep home cooks up on the latest food trends. Like De Knight, I had a middle class upbringing, and I also became the first African American woman to be the food editor of a major daily newspaper—The Cleveland Plain Dealer. I love De Knight because she gave us permission to celebrate the wide diversity of what African Americans cooked and ate. Prior to her work, people would not accept that African Americans enjoyed preparing Chinese, French, Italian and other ethnic dishes. Their thinking was 'You don't really own that because that's white food.'

Without De Knight's work, we'd still be operating under the status quo argument that African American cuisine is represented by a narrow spectrum of food. Though her language can be somewhat encoded, "De Knight is essentially saying 'I've talked to middle class black people, and y'all don't really know what middle class black people eat!' Now, I no longer want to have a conversation about what black people should cook. We've been cooking everything from day one."

== Death ==
In 1960, Freda DeKnight underwent surgery for cancer. Still, she continued to travel with the fashion fair until 1962, when advancing illness left her increasingly weakened. She died in 1963 at age 53.

DeKnight's obituary appeared in the August 1963 issue of Negro Digest. It was titled "Tribute To A Lady Titan." Noting her role in revamping the image of African-Americans in the public sphere, the writer called DeKnight "a familiar figure at professional food and fashion gatherings where Negroes had been seen before only as servants." She opened the door to career choices for future generations.
