= Journey into Fear =

Journey into Fear may refer to:

- Journey into Fear (novel), a 1940 British spy novel by Eric Ambler
- Journey into Fear (1943 film), a 1943 American film based on the novel
- Journey into Fear (1975 film), a 1975 Canadian film based on the novel
- Journey Into Fear, a 1966 television show based on the novel. It only aired 1 episode.
