= Ruritanian romance =

Literary genre of fictional royalty

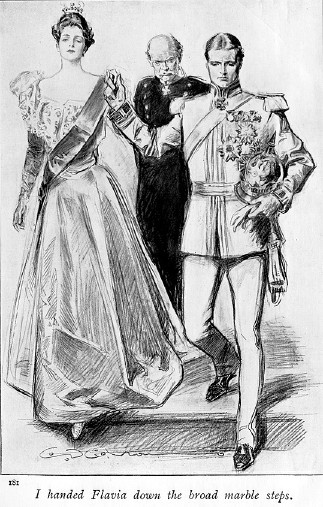
Frontispiece to The Prisoner of Zenda by Anthony Hope.

Ruritanian romance is a genre of literature, film and theatre comprising novels, stories, plays and films set in a fictional country, usually in Central or Eastern Europe, such as the "Ruritania" that gave the genre its name.

Such stories are typically swashbuckling adventure novels, tales of high romance and intrigue, centered on the ruling classes, almost always aristocracy and royalty, although (for instance) Winston Churchill's novel Savrola, in every other way a typical example of the genre, concerns a revolution to restore rightful parliamentary government in the republican country of Laurania. The themes of honor, loyalty and love predominate, and the works frequently feature the restoration of legitimate government after a period of usurpation or dictatorship.

== History of the genre ==
Romantic stories about the royalty of a fictional kingdom were common, for instance Robert Louis Stevenson's Prince Otto (1885). But it was the great popularity of Anthony Hope's The Prisoner of Zenda (1894) which set the type, with its handsome political decoy restoring the rightful king to the throne, and resulted in a burst of similar popular fiction, such as George Barr McCutcheon's Graustark novels (1901–27) and Frances Hodgson Burnett's The Lost Prince (1915), Edgar Rice Burrough's The Mad King (1914), and other homages. In children's literature, the 1938–39 Adventures of Tintin comic King Ottokar's Sceptre is an adventure about foiling a plot to depose the king of Syldavia. Literary critic John Sutherland says Eric Ambler brought the Ruritanian romance to "its highest pitch" with his 1939 novel The Mask of Dimitrios. An earlier venture into Ruritanian themes was Ambler's very first novel, The Dark Frontier (1936), set in the fictional Balkan country of Ixania. George MacDonald Fraser's 1970 novel Royal Flash and the 1975 film Royal Flash based on it are set in the fictional Duchy of Strackenz, and its plot freely borrows many elements of Anthony Hope's book; indeed, Fraser's protagonist Harry Flashman audaciously claims that Hope had plagiarised his own exploits.

The genre was widely spoofed and mocked. George Bernard Shaw's Arms and the Man (1894) parodied many elements. Dorothy Sayers's Have His Carcase (1932) featured as the murder victim a man deceived by his murderers because of his foolish belief in his royal ancestry, fed by endless reading of Ruritanian romances. The Marx Brothers film Duck Soup (1933) is set in a bankrupt Freedonia. Antal Szerb's Oliver VII (1943) features a monarch of a fictional Central European state who plots a coup against himself and then flees to Venice in order to experience the life of an ordinary person. Similarly, Charlie Chaplin's A King in New York (1957) starts with King Igor Shahdov being overthrown by a revolution in his Eastern European country Estrovia and coming to live in exile in New York. In the satire The Mouse That Roared (1955), the Duchy of Grand Fenwick attempts to avoid bankruptcy by declaring war on the United States as a ploy for gaining American aid. In Vladimir Nabokov's Pale Fire (1962), the main narrator has the delusion of being the incognito king of a "distant northern land" who romantically escaped a Soviet-backed revolution. In the comic film The Great Race (1965), rally driver Professor Fate (played by Jack Lemmon) is the double of the Crown Prince of the tiny kingdom of Carpania.

The popularity of the genre declined after the first part of the twentieth century. Aside from the change in literary taste, the royalist elements of Ruritanian romances became less plausible as many European monarchies receded even from memory, and their restorations grew less likely.

Many elements of the genre have been transplanted into fantasy worlds, particularly those of fantasy of manners and alternate history. The science fiction writer Andre Norton first reached success with a 1934 Ruritanian novel, The Prince Commands. Although "Ruritania" originally referred to a contemporary country, the idea has been adapted for use in historical fiction. A subgenre of this is historical romance, such as Jennifer Blake's Royal Seduction and its sequel Royal Passion; both are set in the nineteenth century and feature Prince Rolfe (later King) and his son Prince Roderic respectively, of the fictional Balkan country of Ruthenia. (Ruthenia is a genuine geographic name, identifying an area of eastern Europe somewhat to the north of the Balkan Peninsula, in the Carpathian Mountains, but is not an independent country.)

== Other Ruritanian settings in fiction ==
Marvel Comics created the character Victor Von Doom, absolute monarch of Latveria in the Balkans, who combines recognizable elements of a Ruritanian monarch with being a formidable comics supervillain.

The Grand Budapest Hotel, a 2014 comedy film written and directed by Wes Anderson, is set in the fictional nation of Zubrowka, a central European alpine state teetering on the outbreak of war.

The Peacher Series by Michael Arram is 16 novels published online which occur largely in modern-day Ruritania, renamed Ruthenia. The Crown of Tassilo is a second series of five more novels which occur in the period between Anthony Hope's novels (late 1880s) and modern day. The linked novels cover a wide range of genres but cover topics including the restoration of the Ruthenian monarchy, aristocratic intrigue, commoners, love, Christianity, history of the fictional country, the Ruthenian language, and gay eroticism.

Avram Davidson's Doctor Eszterhazy stories are set in a fictitious ramshackle Balkan empire resembling Austria-Hungary, but with Ruritanian characteristics.

Ursula K. Le Guin set a number of short stories and a novel in the fictitious Eastern European land of "Orsinia", which has been identified as being simultaneously Ruritanian and naturalistic.

Hayao Miyazaki's animated film The Castle of Cagliostro is set in the fictional country of Cagliostro, inspired by Riviera and Monaco.

The Student Prince, an operetta by Sigmund Romberg and Dorothy Donnelly, also adapted several times to film, has as its protagonist the heir apparent to the fictitious kingdom of Karlsberg who is sent away to the University of Heidelberg where he falls in love with a barmaid. The affair is doomed by his royal responsibilities when he is recalled to attend his dying grandfather, the king. Subsequent to his succession he is forced by duty to marry a well-dowered princess.

The Tin Princess is a 1994 children's novel by Philip Pullman set in the fictional Central European country of Razkavia.

== See also ==
- List of fictional European countries
- Alternate history
- Koenigsmark (novel)
