= Dirty Story (novel) =

1967 novel by Eric Ambler

- First edition (publ. The Bodley Head)
- Author: Eric Ambler
- Language: English
- Publisher: The Bodley Head
- Publication date: 1967
- Publication place: United Kingdom
- Media type: Print
- OCLC: 1264477400
- Preceded by: A Kind of Anger
- Followed by: The Intercom Conspiracy

Dirty Story: A Further Account of the Life and Adventures of Arthur Abdel Simpson is a 1967 novel by Eric Ambler. It was also published as This Gun for Hire.

The book continues the life of Ambler's anti-hero, petty criminal Arthur Abdel Simpson, a man whose English father and Egyptian mother have given him uncertain citizenship. Simpson took part in a daring Istanbul robbery in Ambler's earlier novel The Light of Day.

In Dirty Story Simpson faces the prospect of becoming a penniless exile, a non-citizen of any country. He is forced to become a mercenary for a cynical Central African mining company seeking to secure control of land rich in rare earth ores. He is a misfit with little military experience and is unsuited for the role of mercenary; however, he manages to outwit his ruthless adversaries who are seasoned professionals.

This is one of several novels by Ambler in which statelessness or the danger of becoming stateless (an exile, not a citizen of any country and unwelcome in all countries) features prominently in the plot.

It was nominated for the 1967 Gold Dagger award.

== Plot ==
Arthur Abdel Simpson, who previously appeared in The Light of Day, is refused a replacement British passport. He orders a fake passport on credit, but his employer won't lend him the money to pay for it. To pay off his debt, he is forced to work for a pornographic film company on location in Athens. He recruits actresses from Madame Irma's brothel. When Monsieur Goutard, one of the film producers, attempts to convince the girls to defect to a new brothel, Madame Irma denounces the film production, and Simpson and Goutard are forced to flee by ship.

Simpson pretends to Goutard that he has military experience. After their ship gets stuck in Djibouti, Goutard gets them both hired as mercenaries by Major Kinck of SMMAC, a mining corporation working in the Republic of Mahindi, Central Africa. They fly to Mahindi, where Kinck explains the mission. The Republic of Mahindi and its neighbour, the Republic of Ugazi, have been negotiating to redraw their borders to match the natural boundary of the Nyoka River. However, Ugazi had broken off negotiations after UMAD, a mining corporation working in Ugazi, had discovered a large deposit of rare earths. SMMAC have decided to capture the territory containing the rare earths, making the border negotiations a fait accompli.

Simpson is put in charge of the radio for his unit. Major Willens, one of the mercenaries, reveals to Simpson that he is a double agent working for UMAD. He needs Simpson to transmit a message on the radio, and promises him a hefty payoff. Simpson doubts the promise is worth much, so decides to send the message late, as insurance in case their mission is defeated, but not too early as to jeopardise SMMAC's chances.

The offensive begins the next morning, and Simpson transmits the message. The attack is successful, and in the fog of war, Simpson is able to steal a bundle of passports belonging to UMAD employees. In the evening, the UMAD radio operator recognises Simpson's voice, and reveals he had been in radio contact with Simpson. Simpson and Willens escape across the river to Ugazi.

By threatening to sink SMMAC's ships, UMAD is able to force SMMAC to agree to a joint venture. Simpson flies to Tangier where he is able to sell the passports. He resolves to start a business issuing fake passports in the name of a non-existent country.
