= The Purple Plain (novel) =

1947 novel

- American first edition
- Author: H. E. Bates
- Language: English
- Genre: War
- Publisher: Michael Joseph; Little, Brown (US)
- Publication date: 1947
- Publication place: United Kingdom
- Media type: Print

The Purple Plain is a 1947 war novel by the British writer H. E. Bates. It is set during the Burma Campaign of the Second World War.

== Synopsis ==
The novel's prose is straight-forwardly direct and presents a vivid and harrowing account of human determination to survive in the face of a merciless natural world.

== Film adaptation ==
In 1954, it was adapted into a British film The Purple Plain directed by Robert Parrish and starring Gregory Peck, Win Min Than and Bernard Lee.

== Bibliography ==
- Goble, Alan. The Complete Index to Literary Sources in Film. Walter de Gruyter, 1999.
