= Topkapı Dagger =

Ottoman emerald-studded curved dagger

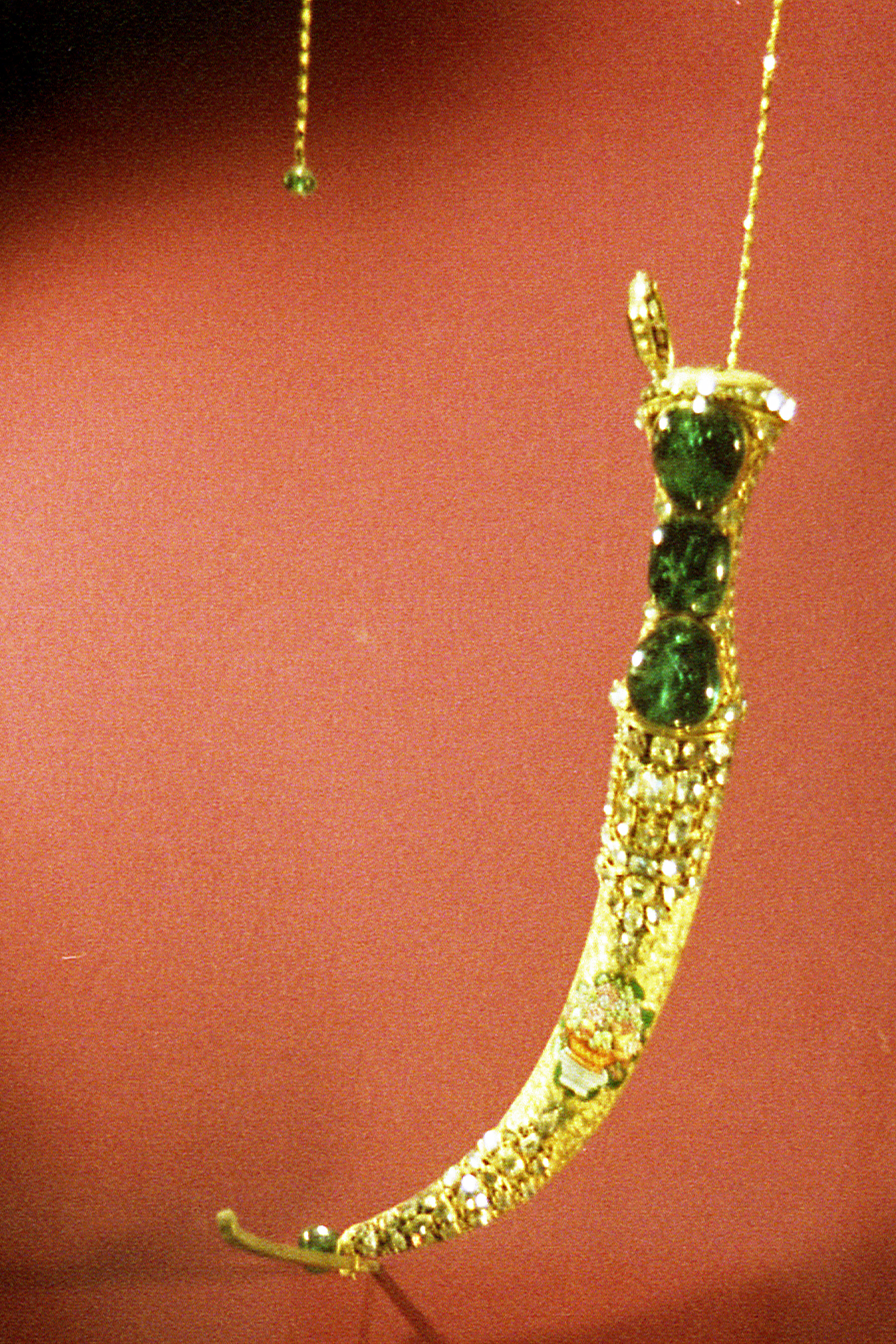
The Topkapı Dagger, with a 35 cm (14 in) long scabbard, largely made of gold, set with jewels. A clock is built into the pommel of the dagger. There are three large emeralds on the handle. Located in the Imperial Treasury of the Topkapı Palace in Istanbul, Türkiye.

The Topkapı Dagger is an emerald-studded curved dagger, known as a jambiya, created in 1746 by Ottoman craftsmen to be given as a gift to the Shah of Persia.

== Commission and provenance ==
The dagger was commissioned by the Ottoman Sultan Mahmud I (r. 1730–54) as a peace offering to the Shah of Iran, Nadir Shah (r. 1736-47). It was among several valuable gifts that was carried by Ahmad Pasha Kesrieli, accompanied by 1,000 retainers. As the embassy traveled en route to the border of Persia, the Ottoman ambassadors learned of the assassination of the Shah (20 June 1747) and returned to Istanbul with the dagger. It is interesting to note that on the eve of his death, Nadir Shah dispatched an assemblage of splendid gifts for Mahmud I, the Ottoman sultan, including pearls from the Persian Gulf, a Mughal throne bedecked with jewels, and two dancing Mughal elephants. Since the Ottoman embassy returned to Istanbul with the gift, Nadir Shah's gift-exchange was only one-sided.

The dagger is housed in the Imperial Treasury, located in the Third Court of the Topkapı Palace in Istanbul, Türkiye.

== Description and significance ==
The sheath of the dagger is adorned with many smaller-sized diamonds that are rose-cut, as well as a polychrome enameled section that is decorated with baskets filled with fruit. Three large Colombian emeralds are set into the gold hilt. The pommel of the dagger has an English watch embedded that is covered by another large emerald.

In Ottoman culture, daggers and swords, along with horses, played an important role in both the military and religious spheres, reinforcing one's legitimization, authority, and leadership. This symbolic role of daggers was not limited to men, as women of high rank carried them too.

For Islam, the color green is traditionally considered the color of the Prophet Mohammed and the concept of paradise. Thus, the inclusion of emeralds on gifts to/from Islamic rulers had added significance, since the stone was imbued with a sacredness. Moreover, gifts with emeralds often indicated the wealth, power, and magnificence of the giver. Large emeralds, such as those found on the Topkapı dagger, were mined in the far away lands of the New Kingdom of Granada (now Colombia, near the town Muzo), further adding notions of otherworldliness and novelty. These large and deeply-colored green emeralds had been discovered by the Europeans after Spanish conquistador Gonzalo Jiménez de Quesada's expedition and subsequent conquest of the region in the 1530s. The emeralds in the Topkapı dagger exuded exoticism and the opulence of court life in Islamic empires such as Ottomans, Safavids, and Mughals.

== Cultural depictions ==
The Topkapı Dagger is one of the most famous objects in the collection of the Topkapı Palace Treasury. The dagger was the main theme of Jules Dassin's 1964 comedic heist film Topkapi, in which it became the desired object of the main character, played by Melina Mercouri. She, along with a group of "world-class" jewelry thieves, plot to steal the dagger from the Topkapı Palace.
