= The Mask of Dimitrios =

1944 film by Jean Negulesco

- Theatrical release poster
- Directed by: Jean Negulesco
- Screenplay by: Frank Gruber
- Based on: The Mask of Dimitrios; 1939 novel by Eric Ambler
- Produced by: Henry Blanke
- Starring: Sydney Greenstreet; Zachary Scott; Faye Emerson; Peter Lorre
- Cinematography: Arthur Edeson
- Edited by: Frederick Richards
- Music by: Adolph Deutsch
- Production company: Warner Bros. Pictures
- Distributed by: Warner Bros. Pictures
- Release date: June 23, 1944
- Running time: 95 minutes
- Country: United States
- Language: English

The Mask of Dimitrios is a 1944 American film noir starring Sydney Greenstreet, Zachary Scott, Faye Emerson, Peter Lorre, and Victor Francen. Directed by Jean Negulesco, it was written by Frank Gruber, based on the 1939 novel of the same title written by Eric Ambler. Scott played the title role, of Dimitrios Makropoulos, in his film debut.

== Plot ==
In 1938, the Dutch mystery writer Cornelius Leyden is visiting Istanbul. At an evening soiree, a fan, Colonel Haki of the Turkish police, believes he would be interested in the story of international intriguer and master criminal Dimitrios Makropoulos, whose body was just washed up on a local beach. Leyden is immediately captivated by what he learns about the Salonika-born one-time fig packer's tale.

The two go to a mortuary to view the body, straining the timid writer's stomach.

Haki then takes Leyden to meet a former lover of Dimitrios, now the madame at a local brothel, igniting a quest that will zig-zag him across Europe. Irana Preveza stoically relates her seduction, Dimitrios' sordid dealings, a high life together that came crashing down when he turned paid assassin. Recalling his flight, footsteps ahead of police, clutching borrowed francs left unpaid, leaves her doubled over in bitter tears.

Leyden leaves for Sofia, sharing an overnight train cabin with a congenial obese Englishman traveling on. Later, he catches the man ransacking his hotel room. Calling himself "Peters", the intruder rants over betrayal by Dimitrios in a smuggling deal that sent him to prison. Suspicious of the report of Dimitrios‘ Istanbul death, Peters plans to blackmail him, now a respected Parisian banker, with the truth of his real identity. Dangling a half share of a million French franc payoff, he seeks to inveigle Leyden in his scheme, but the Dutchman declines to become ensnared. Content to research his book, he follows a clue given him by Peters to Geneva.

There he meets the suave and aristocratic Wladislaw Grodek, a viper who had once hired Dimitrios to obtain some Yugoslavian military secrets for Italy. Dimitrios masterfully manipulated a meek minor government official, Karol Bulic, into a gambling debt so great he handed over a strategic minefield chart to clear it. Caught, Bulic confessed and committed suicide; Dimitrios, playing both sides, double-crossed Grodek and sold the chart to a rival government.

Eventually, Peters sends Leyden to Paris, where he intends to spring his trap on Dimitrios. He does, and collects his one million francs in return for his silence about Dimitrios' true identity and nefarious acts; but the pair is tracked by Dimitrios to a familiar lair. There Dimitrios coldly shoots Peters twice. Leyden, more angry than afraid, launches upon the assailant, sending his revolver flying. As they struggle Peters crawls to the gun, then holds Dimitrios at bay. He sends Leyden away, who hardly reaches the stairs before three shots are heard.

Police immediately arrive, and take the garrulous Peters into custody. Over his shoulder he bids farewell to Leyden, urging him to send on a copy of his book to him in prison.

== Cast ==
- Sydney Greenstreet as Mr. Peters
- Zachary Scott as Dimitrios Makropoulos
- Faye Emerson as Irana Preveza
- Peter Lorre as Cornelius Leyden
- Victor Francen as Wladislaw Grodek
- Steven Geray as Karol Bulic
- Florence Bates as Madame Elise Chavez
- Eduardo Ciannelli as Marukakis
- Kurt Katch as Colonel Haki
- Marjorie Hoshelle as Anna Bulic
- Georges Metaxa as Hans Werner
- John Abbott as Mr. Pappas
- Monte Blue as Abdul Dhris
- David Hoffman as Konrad
- Carmen D'Antonio as Nightclub Dancer
- Felix Basch as Vazoff
- Fred Essler as Bostoff
- John Mylong as Druhar
- Stuart Holmes as Casino Patron
- Hella Petri as Bulgarian hostess

== Production ==
The novel The Mask of Dimitrios was published in 1939. The character Dimitrios Makropoulos in Ambler's book drew upon the early career of notorious munitions kingpin and "merchant of death" Sir Basil Zaharoff, whose life, wealth, and villainy were also portrayed in the titular character of the Orsen Welles mystery thriller Mr. Arkadin.

The assassination attempt involving Dimitrios was based on a 1923 plot against the agrarian reform prime minister of Bulgaria, Aleksandar Stamboliyski, who survived the February 2, 1923, shooting but was murdered by right-wing secret police on June 14 following a successful coup d'état.

Film rights were bought by Warner Bros. Pictures. The screenplay was assigned to A.I. Bezzerides with Henry Blanke to produce and Nancy Coleman and Helmut Dantine to star. Coleman did not like her role and Faye Emerson replaced her. Dantine was assigned to another film and replaced by Zachary Scott in his film debut, who had just impressed on Broadway in Those Endearing Young Charms.

== Reception ==
=== Critical response ===
New York Times film critic Bosley Crowther gave the film a mixed review in June 1944: "In telling the picaresque story of a mystery writer on the trail of a Levantine bum whose career of crime in the Balkans has stimulated the writer's awe, the film wallows deeply in discourse and tediously trite flashbacks...To be sure, the Warner schemists have poured some scabby atmosphere into this film and have been very liberal with the scenery in picturing international haunts and Balkan dives...This sort of worldly melodrama calls for refinement in cinematic style, but the writing and direction of this picture betray a rather clumsy, conventional approach."

An undated UK Channel 4 review asserts that "the film promises more action than it delivers, but there are opportunities for fine performances by Lorre and, especially, Greenstreet as the master crook. Atmospheric cinematography and an intriguing script turn this into a fine example of film noir with an immensely entertaining cast."

TV Guide called the movie "One of the great film noir classics to come out of the 1940s, The Mask of Dimitrios boasts no superstars, just uniformly fine talents, a terrific script full of subtle intrigue and surprises, and Negulesco's exciting direction. It's an edge-of-the-seater all the way."

== Adaptation ==
The Mask of Dimitrios was adapted as a radio play aired on the April 16, 1945, broadcast of The Screen Guild Theater, with Greenstreet and Lorre reprising their roles.
