= The Dark Frontier =

1936 novel by Eric Ambler

- First edition
- Author: Eric Ambler
- Language: English
- Publisher: Hodder & Stoughton
- Publication date: 1936
- Publication place: United Kingdom
- Media type: Print
- OCLC: 809179463
- Followed by: Uncommon Danger

The Dark Frontier (1936) is Eric Ambler's first novel. Based on the development of weaponry in the year 1936, The Dark Frontier anticipates the invention of a nuclear bomb and its consequences.

== Background ==
Ambler wrote about the novel's genesis thus:

... Became press agent for film star, but soon after joined big London advertising agency as copywriter and 'ideas man'. During next few years wrote incessantly on variety of subjects ranging from baby food to non-ferrous alloys. Have travelled in most countries of Europe, been stranded in Marseille and nearly drowned in the Bay of Naples. Decided, on a rainy day in Paris, to write a thriller. Result was The Dark Frontier.

== Plot ==
The novel is set in 1934 or 1935 in Ixania, a small fictional country somewhere in a mountainous region of the Balkans bordering Romania. Throughout modern history Ixania, a "God-forsaken country", has preserved its political independence because of its lack of natural resources and its comparative irrelevance in economic matters. The country is a dictatorship controlled by Countess Schverzinski. Jacob Kassen, a nuclear scientist, has invented a formula to build an tactical nuclear weapon (the "Kassen secret"), with which the Countess intends to conquer Ixania's neighbours and threaten Europe.

Simon Groom, an unscrupulous British armaments manufacturer, is sent to Ixania to get hold of the Kassen secret by hook or by crook. He attempts to enlist the services of Professor Henry Barstow, an English physicist, to travel with him to determine whether the secret papers, whose theft he plans to commission, are authentic and worth the money. The idealistic Barstow refuses.

Barstow reads a few pages of a "Conway Carruthers" novel, about a Doc Savage-style adventurer. He then has a car accident and suffers concussion. The previously timid Barstow begins to believe he is Carruthers, and miraculously gains Carruthers' superhuman skills of decisiveness, strategy and fighting ability. He realises the Kassen secret poses "a serious menace to world peace", and makes it his mission to rid the world of the danger by destroying all copies of Kassen's papers.

As "Carruthers", Barstow travels to Ixania. He pretends to accept Groom's job offer, and encounters the femme fatale Countess on the train. Carruthers' charismatic authority attracts the attention of William L. Casey, an American journalist stationed in Zovgorod, the capital of Ixania. Originally only interested in a good story, Casey becomes Carruthers's quasi-assistant, a change Casey himself describes as his "transition from newspaper man to desperado".

They reconnoitre Kassen's laboratory and the Countess's mansion, where the only two copies of the papers are stored. They are captured by the Countess, and Carruthers is ordered to leave the country. Instead, Carruthers goes into hiding with a party of peasant revolutionaries, and revises their plans for a coup d'état. With the revolutionaries, Carruthers and Casey destroy Kassen's laboratory while the revolution takes place back in the capital. Kassen is killed.

The revolution is successful and unbloody, however the Countess escapes with her copy of the secret. Carruthers and Casey pursue her Mercedes at breakneck speed along a dark and narrow mountain road, with Carruthers showing brilliant driving ability. As they catch up with her vehicle, she has an accident, is catapulted out of her car, and dies. The wreck of her Mercedes catches fire, and Carruthers casts the last copy of the Kassen secret into the flames.

Casey takes a sabbatical from his newspaper to act as press officer for the new government, to help it gain recognition and financing from other states. Ixania disbands its army, to the dismay of international arms companies and the newspapers they control.

Carruthers returns to England, but is attacked on the train by Groom, who believes he has a copy of the Kassen secret. He is hit on the head again, and transforms back into Professor Barstow.

== Reception ==
The novel was one of the first six of Ambler's books which made his name. Ambler wrote in his autobiography, "As I saw it, the thriller had nowhere to go but up".

The Dark Frontier parodies the conventions of the contemporary British thriller, particularly E. Phillips Oppenheim and John Buchan, but improves upon them.

== See also ==
- History of nuclear weapons
