= The Care of Time =

1981 novel by Eric Ambler

- First edition (publ. Farrar Straus Giroux)
- Author: Eric Ambler
- Language: English
- Publisher: Farrar, Straus and Giroux
- Publication date: 1981
- Publication place: United Kingdom
- Media type: Print
- OCLC: 952979775
- Preceded by: Send No More Roses

The Care of Time (1981) is the last novel by British spy fiction writer Eric Ambler.

== Plot ==
Robert Halliday is an American ghostwriter and former journalist and television interviewer. He receives a bomb warning from Karlis Zander, followed by the bomb. Zander is a notorious terrorist and now an advisor to a Gulf monarch. Halliday calls the bomb disposal squad, who alert the FBI.

At the same time, Halliday receives an unusually well-remunerated job offer to edit the memoirs of Sergei Nechayev, a nineteenth century Russian revolutionary terrorist. These are to be published with a commentary by "Dr Luccio", an advisor to a Gulf monarch. The publishing company is a subsidiary of Syncom-Sentinel, a conglomerate with oil interests which is funding the project as a favour to a Gulf client. The publishing company executives are threatened into approving the project. Halliday realises that "Luccio" and "Zander" are both words for "pike", and that "Dr Luccio" and Karlis Zander are the same person.

Intrigued, Halliday travels to Milan to meet Luccio. He is abducted from his hotel room and taken to Luccio/Zander's safe house. Zander is on the run from Rasmuk, a gang of international terrorists who have been offered an unusually high fee to kill him.

On returning to his hotel, Halliday is met by his former CIA handler, as well as Dieter Schelm, a West German intelligence agent on secondment to NATO. Halliday previously spent some time in an Iraqi jail as a CIA agent. Their attention has been drawn by the bomb threat. They reveal the Nechayev memoirs are a forgery, which contained a message to them in Esperanto shorthand, an anachronism invented after Nechayev's death. The whole memoirs project is a front, and Halliday was actually chosen by Zander because he can put Zander in touch with the CIA.

Zander's employer is the Emir of one of the emirates of the United Arab Emirates, referred to only as "The Ruler". The Ruler wishes to make an offer to NATO to build a military base on his territory. However, he does not want his fellow Emirs to know in advance that he has approached the Western Bloc, so Zander has contrived a cover story where it can appear as if the West have approached the Ruler. Halliday is to make a television interview with the Ruler at his house in Austria. At the same time, NATO representatives will meet with the Ruler.

Zander realises that the contract on his head has been paid for by the Ruler. Zander is the only independent witness who knows that the Ruler approached the West, so the Ruler wants him eliminated after the meeting.

The Ruler has purchased a house in Austria above an abandoned silver mine. With a cover story that he is converting it into a health clinic, he has constructed a fallout shelter to protect himself from biological weapons.

As Halliday and Zander travel to the Ruler's Austrian estate, their television van attracts attention from other media outlets. They decide to make a real television interview.

Halliday's questioning exposes the Ruler as a deranged psychopath, obsessed with biological weapons. Dieter Schelm and his NATO negotiating colleague are informed that in exchange for allowing a military base to be constructed, the Ruler wants permission to test biological weapons on humans. The Ruler's assistants attempt to confiscate the interview film, but Halliday switches it and escapes with Zander.

Pursued by Rasmuk, they pull off the road and there is a shoot-out. They survive, and Halliday is able to publish the film. The Ruler is deposed by his fellow Emirs, and committed to a maximum-security mental hospital.

== Reception ==
Kirkus Reviews wrote that the book is "elaborately farfetched" and "doesn't quite triumph by the more conventional criteria for suspense". However, P.D. James wrote "Ambler controls his complicated plot with brilliant expertise".

Writing in 2015, John Gray described the book as "prescient".

== Adaptations ==
The book was adapted for television in 1990, directed by John Davies, with Michael Brandon as Robert Halliday and Christopher Lee as Karlis Zander.
