= Cause for Alarm (novel) =

1938 novel by Eric Ambler

- First US edition cover (Alfred A. Knopf)
- Author: Eric Ambler
- Language: English
- Series: Zaleshoff
- Publisher: Hodder & Stoughton
- Publication date: 1938
- Publication place: United Kingdom
- Media type: Print
- OCLC: 1051064811
- Preceded by: Epitaph for a Spy
- Followed by: The Mask of Dimitrios

Cause for Alarm is a novel by Eric Ambler first published in 1938. Set in Fascist Italy during that year, the book is one of Ambler's classic spy thrillers.

== Plot summary ==
Nicholas Marlow, an English engineer engaged to a young doctor, loses his well-paid job. A replacement is hard to find amid the Great Depression, but his ability to speak some Italian wins him a post with the Spartacus Machine Tool Company in Wolverhampton. This engineering firm manufactures the "Spartacus Type S2 automatic" boring machine, which is used for shell production. Marlow signs on as Spartacus's representative in Italy, secretly deciding that he will quit the job as soon as possible to go back to England and get married.

Upon arrival in Milan, Marlow discovers there is a huge backlog at his office, and that his personal assistant Bellinetti is highly inefficient. A lot of his time is diverted by the Italian authorities, to whom he has to report on a regular basis and who eventually claim that they have misplaced his passport, meaning he is unable to leave the country. There is growing uneasiness on Marlow's part when he notices his private correspondence with his fiancée has been steamed open. He makes friends with Andreas Zaleshoff, a Russian spy whose office is in the same building. Marlow learns his predecessor was murdered, and that Bellinetti is an agent for the OVRA.

Marlow is contacted by a General Vagas, a Yugoslav of German descent, who asks Marlow to spy for him. Zaleshoff informs Marlow that Vagas is actually a German agent, and encourages Marlow to accept the offer and feed Vagas information supplied by Zaleshoff. Zaleshoff's intention is to sow discord in the alliance between Italy and Germany.

Vagas's wife reports him to the Italian authorities, and an arrest warrant is issued for Marlow. Assisted by Zaleshoff and his sister Tamara, Marlow succeeds in escaping from Milan. The two men embark on a several-day-long journey by train and on foot, headed for the Yugoslav border. A mountain snowstorm compels them to spend the night with Beronelli, a former mathematics professor. Driven out of his job because of his indifferent response to the Fascist government, Beronelli has become delusional, believing that he has discovered the secret of perpetual motion; his daughter recognises Zaleshoff and Marlow as fugitives, but spares them in return for their humouring her father. They reach Zagreb, from which Marlow can safely travel home to England.

== Context ==
Like many of Ambler's novels, it features an amateur hero who is out of his depth.

The characters of Zaleshoff and Tamara also play a significant role in Ambler's novel Uncommon Danger.
