= Doctor Frigo =

1974 novel by Eric Ambler

- First edition (UK)
- Author: Eric Ambler
- Language: English
- Publisher: Weidenfeld & Nicolson (UK); Atheneum Books (US)
- Publication date: 1974
- Publication place: United Kingdom
- Media type: Print
- OCLC: 1118315082
- Preceded by: The Levanter
- Followed by: Send No More Roses

Doctor Frigo is a 1974 novel by Eric Ambler.

== Plot ==
Dr. Ernesto Castillo is a young, cynical physician living and practicing on the fictional French-Caribbean Island St. Paul-les-Alizés. His nickname, "Dr. Frigo", means, literally, "Dr. Frozen-Meat"; it refers to his cold, unsympathetic demeanor with patients and colleagues. St. Paul is not his native land; he lives in exile because, some years before, his father, a left-wing revolutionary, led an unsuccessful uprising against the ruling junta in his native land (which the book does not name), and was assassinated. At that time, Castillo was beginning his medical training at a prestigious medical school in another country. He now spends most of his free time with his girlfriend, a beautiful but moody art-dealer descended from a leading member of the Habsburg dynasty and neurotically obsessed with its history.

Very recently, oil has been discovered in Dr. Castillo's native land, and his late father's former comrades are planning a second insurgency. Their leader, who was a close friend of Dr. Castillo's father, comes to St. Paul accompanied by some of his gang of conspirators. He consults Dr. Castillo as a patient, with some puzzling neurological symptoms. At the same time, the conspirators seek to recruit Dr. Castillo to their cause: as the son of the assassinated leader, he would be a useful figurehead to lead the planned rebellion.

Dr. Castillo learns that his new patient has early-stage amyotrophic lateral sclerosis (ALS, the incurable illness which afflicted Stephen Hawking and Lou Gehrig). The patient will soon be completely and permanently incapacitated. The other conspirators perceive the intensifying symptoms and realize that their revolution will not succeed unless Dr. Castillo takes the place of the ailing leader.

At the same time, agents of the local government pressure Dr. Castillo to spy on the conspirators while making house-calls to his patient. Caught between the government's threats and his professional obligation of patient-confidentiality, he reluctantly agrees to work with the revolutionaries. As he gets to know them better, he begins to suspect that his patient, not anyone associated with the junta, may be the one who ordered his father's assassination.

Dr. Castillo, his patient, and the conspirators return to their homeland; the rebellion begins. An insider who was involved in planning the murder of Dr. Castillo's father confirms his suspicion: his patient is the man who ordered his father's murder after the first insurrection failed. Dr. Castillo now has a unique opportunity to avenge his father's death. This would (of course) violate medical ethics and the law. He also knows that even if he passes over the opportunity for vengeance, the patient will still die slowly of his illness, with great suffering.

Before Dr. Castillo can decide what to do about all this, the patient gets betrayed and assassinated by another member of his group. Happily relieved of his dilemma, Dr. Castillo returns home to his medical practice and his fiancée.

== Reception ==
It is regarded as one of Ambler's best works.

Kirkus Reviews described the book as "urbane, amusing, cautionary and threateningly urgent".
