= Uncommon Danger =

Novel by Eric Ambler

- First edition
- Author: Eric Ambler
- Language: English
- Series: Zaleshoff
- Publisher: Hodder & Stoughton
- Publication date: 1937
- Publication place: United Kingdom
- Media type: Print
- OCLC: 312625988
- Preceded by: The Dark Frontier
- Followed by: Epitaph for a Spy

Uncommon Danger is the second novel by British thriller writer Eric Ambler, published in 1937. It was published in the United States as Background To Danger. In his autobiography, Here Lies Eric Ambler, Ambler explains that "Background To Danger" was the original title, but his British publisher disliked the word 'background', so it was published in all English-speaking countries except the US as Uncommon Danger.

== Plot ==
Bessarabia has been a contested area between Russia and Romania since the Great War. It contains important oil fields. A Russian double-agent (Borovansky) has stolen Russian plans for a possible attack on Bessarabia. If these are made public it will whip up anti-Russian feeling in Romania and help the Fascist Iron Guard to power, and help them make an alliance with Nazi Germany. The spy is taking them by train south into Austria.

Russian spies Andreas Zaleshoff and his sister Tamara are tipped off and commission a Spaniard, Ortega, to pursue Borovansky on the train, follow him to his hotel in Austria, and get the plans back.

Mr Balterghen of the British-based Pan-Eurasian Petroleum Company (PEPC) wants the question of the Romanian Concessions, i.e. which external oil companies can exploit Romania's oil, to be re-opened so that PEPC can bribe its way to new concessions. He commissions one 'Colonel Robinson' to do this. Zaleshoff realises that 'Robinson' is the assassin and propagandist-for-hire Stefan Saridza, accompanied by his henchman Captain Mailler.

So, as the story begins, two separate sets of men are on the track of Borovansky and his photos.

The protagonist of the novel is Kenton, a down-at-heel freelance journalist who loses money gambling and takes the train to Vienna to borrow money from a man he knows there, Rosen, a Jew he helped escape Germany after the Nazis came to power. He is befriended on the train by a shifty foreigner, Sachs, who asks him to carry a package through customs on the Austrian border and who seems to be being followed on the train. When they arrive at Linz, Sachs asks Kenton to carry the envelope off the train and bring it to him at a particular hotel later that night. Kenton agrees for a price of 600 Marks.

When he arrives at the run-down hotel to hand over the envelope, Kenton finds Sachs murdered. He goes through Sachs's pockets and takes his wallet, but leaves his fingerprint on the crime scene. One of Saridza's gang comes up the stairs, and Kenton escapes out the back.

The reader realises that Sachs is Borovansky and Kenton is now in possession of photographs of military plans which could alter the course of European history. The police are informed of Sachs's death and Kenton finds himself wanted for murder.

Kenton leaves the photographs at a café, but is captured by Saridza's men. He is tortured at Saridza's house, but is rescued by Zaleshoff. However, Saridza's men retrieve the photographs from the café. Kenton leaves Zaleshoff's safe house and crosses into Czechoslovakia by tunneling under the border fence. Kenton and Zaleshoff attempt to raid another Saridza house to retrieve the photographs, but Saridza is expecting them and they are captured. They are tied up with wire and taken to an electrical cable factory, where they are imprisoned in a vulcanising chamber. They manage to cut through their restraints and escape before the oxygen runs out.

Surmising that Saridza would have a copy made of the photographs at a private photography studio, they bluff their way into a newspaper office known to be linked to Saridza's cause. The editor calls the police, but they destroy the photographic negatives and escape. They pursue Saridza's car, and in a final gun-fight, Mailler is killed and Saridza gives up the photographs. Kenton lets Saridza go free.

== Context ==
Kenton is a typical Ambler protagonist, an amateur hero who is out of his depth. The novel features real details from anti-Fascist refugees Ambler had met in Paris.

The characters of Zaleshoff and his sister Tamara - also a Soviet agent - also play a significant role in Ambler's novel Cause for Alarm.

Ambler's pre-war novels contain numerous passages criticising big business and capitalism. This, combined with the prominent and friendly role played by KGB agents, led to suggestions that he was himself a left-wing sympathiser, claims he was later at pains to play down.

It was difficult, Kenton had found, to spend any length of time in the arena of foreign politics without perceiving that political ideologies had very little to do with the ebb and flow of international relations. It was the power of Business, not the deliberations of statesmen, that shaped the destinies of nations. The Foreign Ministers of the great powers might make the actual declarations of their Governments' policies; but it was the Big Business men, the bankers and their dependents, the arms manufacturers, the oil companies, the big industrialists, who determined what those policies should be. Big Business asked the questions that it wanted to ask when and how it suited it. Big Business also provided the answers. Rome might declare herself sympathetic to a Habsburg restoration; France might oppose it. A few months later the situation might be completely reversed. For those few members of the public who had long memories and were not sick to death of the whole incomprehensible farce there would always be many ingenious explanations of the volte face – many explanations, but not the correct one. For that one might have to inquire into banking transactions in London, Paris and New York with the eye of a chartered accountant, the brain of an economist, the tongue of a prosecuting attorney and the patience of Job. One would have, perhaps, to note an increase in the Hungarian bank rate, an 'ear-marking' of gold in Amsterdam, and a restriction of credit facilities in the Middle-West of America. One would have to grope through the fog of technical mumbo-jumbo with which international business surrounds its operations and examine them in all their ghastly simplicity. Then one would perhaps die of old age. The Big Business man was only one player in the game of international politics, but he was the player who made all the rules.

== Film adaptation ==
The novel was made into a film using the US title, Background to Danger, released in 1943. It was directed by Raoul Walsh and starred George Raft as the protagonist (renamed Joe Barton), Sydney Greenstreet as the antagonist Colonel Robinson, Peter Lorre as Zaleshoff, and Brenda Marshall as Tamara.
