= A Kind of Anger =

1964 novel by Eric Ambler

- First UK edition (publ. The Bodley Head)
- Author: Eric Ambler
- Language: English
- Publisher: The Bodley Head
- Publication date: 1964
- Publication place: United Kingdom
- Media type: Print
- ISBN: 0307950034
- OCLC: 926820525
- Preceded by: The Light of Day
- Followed by: Dirty Story

A Kind of Anger is a novel by British thriller writer Eric Ambler, published in 1964.

== Plot ==
Piet Maas is a Dutch reporter working for the (fictional) news magazine World Reporter. He had previously edited and owned the magazine Ethos, but it had gone bankrupt and Maas had attempted suicide. He is tasked by Mr Cust, owner of World Reporter, with tracking down Lucia Bernardi, girlfriend of Colonel Ahmed Arbil, an Iraqi Kurd living in Zürich who was recently murdered. Lucia escaped and has gone into hiding.

Bernardi had been associated with con-man Patrick Chase, real name Phillip Sanger. Maas locates Sanger and his wife Adèle in the south of France, where they own a string of rental properties, and threatens to reveal Sanger's false identity unless he helps him find Lucia Bernardi. Sanger offers Maas thirty thousand dollars to restart his magazine, in exchange for his silence, but Maas refuses. Adèle reveals Lucia is staying in one of their empty properties, and Lucia agrees to an interview.

Lucia states that Colonel Arbil was assassinated by the Committee for Kurdish independence, and that she has his papers. Maas's editor demands to know how he found Lucia, but mindful of her safety, Maas refuses to say. Instead he warns Sanger and his wife they will be pursued by the magazine.

Maas goes to the public records office in Nice to locate Sanger's other properties so he can find Lucia again. He encounters a Mr Skurleti looking for the same records. Maas realises Lucia wants to sell Arbil's papers. Lucia says the Committee had been infiltrated by the Soviets, and Arbil had infiltrated it in turn, as a spy for the Iraqi government. However, his status as a double agent had been leaked to the committee by someone within the Iraqi government, and the committee had had him murdered, hoping to capture and destroy the documents.

Skurleti is working for an Italian oil consortium with activities in Iraq, who wish to buy the documents. Also bidding is Brigadier Farisi of the Iraqi government. Arbil had made two copies of the documents, so Lucia and Maas decide to sell them twice. Farisi agrees to pay four hundred and ninety thousand francs. Skurleti pays two hundred thousand francs, on the condition that there is only one copy of the documents, and Maas and Lucia do not attempt to contact Farisi, or they will be killed by the committee.

Maas and Lucia telephone the Sangers, asking for the use of their main house as a hideout. On the way, they are pursued by Czech-speaking committee agents. Sanger returns, and suggests Maas and Lucia hand themselves in to the police, to make the committee think they have not been double-crossed. While they do this, he will meet Farisi and exchange the documents for the money. Maas gives the story to his old colleagues at World Reporter.

At the end of the day, Sanger returns but claims Farisi paid only half the agreed amount. Maas and Lucia think Sanger has kept the other half for himself, but there is little they can do about it. They decide to restart Ethos together.

== Context ==
The plot of the novel is rooted in the history of the Kurds. This is explained at some length in the novel, from the post-Great War Treaty of Sèvres onwards. Mention is also made of the 1958 coup which overthrew the Iraqi monarchy to create the republic of Iraq.

== Reception ==
The New York Times wrote that "as anti-heroes go, Piet Maas is a fairly extreme case". Kirkus Reviews wrote that Ambler ensures "a well-meshed, plausible plot and credible characters".
