= The Purple Plain =

1954 film

- Australian film poster
- Directed by: Robert Parrish
- Screenplay by: Eric Ambler
- Based on: The Purple Plain by H. E. Bates
- Produced by: John Bryan
- Starring: Gregory Peck; Win Min Than; Maurice Denham; Lyndon Brook; Bernard Lee
- Cinematography: Geoffrey Unsworth
- Edited by: Clive Donner
- Music by: John Veale
- Production company: Two Cities Films
- Distributed by: General Film Distributors; United Artists (US)
- Release date: 14 September 1954
- Running time: 100 minutes
- Country: United Kingdom
- Language: English
- Box office: $1.3 million (US)

The Purple Plain is a 1954 British war film directed by Robert Parrish, with Gregory Peck playing a Royal Canadian Air Force pilot serving in the Royal Air Force in the Burma campaign in the closing months of the Second World War, who is battling with depression after having lost his wife to German bombing in London. The cast also included Win Min Than, Maurice Denham and Lyndon Brook. The film was shot at Pinewood Studios and on location in Ceylon. The film's sets were designed by the art director Jack Maxsted. It was nominated for two BAFTA awards. The film was based on the 1947 novel of the same name by H. E. Bates.

== Plot ==
Bill Forrester, a RCAF pilot serving in the Royal Air Force in Burma, pilots a de Havilland Mosquito, a two-seat fighter-bomber. Forrester is distraught after losing his new wife in the Blitz in London and has become self-destructive. His reckless conduct concern his commanding officer because it endangers his flight crews, and others become reluctant to fly with Forrester. The commander seeks to have him grounded. However it would require the approval of the base flight surgeon. The doctor agrees reluctantly to examine him, despite the fact that Forrester is highly decorated and the best pilot in the squadron. He convinces Forrester to visit a village, where he is introduced to beautiful Burmese woman named Anna. They strike up a friendship and continue to see each other. He tells Anna about the loss of his wife and his desire to end his own life by dying in action; "You'd think that would be easy in a war, but I just kept getting medals instead." Anna and he begin to fall in love and with Anna's support, Bill begins to recover.

Forrester is allowed to fly a ferry mission. He and his new navigator, Carrington, are assigned to fly Flight Lieutenant Blore, riding in the Mosquito's bomb bay, to Meiktila. An engine fire forces them down in a remote arid area controlled by the Japanese. The soil and surrounding hills have a purple hue, thus the name of the film.

Carrington is injured during the crash landing. His leg is badly burned and he is unable to walk. Without supplies and very little water, Forrester decides their best chance is to walk 30 miles to the nearest river, where they can get water. There they would stand a better chance of rescue. Blore, on the other hand, believes they should stay with the plane and wait for rescue, as search parties will surely be looking for them. Forrester points out that being spotted from the air is highly unlikely. They build a stretcher for Carrington out of bamboo and set out for the river, walking at night and resting during the day. Forrester proves to have the strongest will to live.

During the trek, Blore slips and falls down a rocky slope, breaking his collarbone and being unable to help carry the stretcher. With water running out, Forrester decides that Blore should go by himself and bring back water, while he stays with Carrington. Blore objects and wants to return to the plane. Forrester tells him to sleep on it, and they can decide once they get some rest.

Upon waking, Forrester discovers that Blore has gone, but he has left the canteen with some water in it. Forrester leaves the canteen with Carrington and sets out after Blore. However, Blore commits suicide before Forrester can reach him. He finds Blore's wallet with a picture of his family in it, a wife and two children. Forrester returns to Carrington.

Forrester carries Carrington on his back. Eventually, Forrester collapses on the desert floor. Carrington convinces him that their only hope now is for Forrester to go to the river and bring back water. Forrester struggles on by himself. He goes up a hill and falls face down, unable to go any further. He hears the sound of water. On the other side is the river. Forrester returns with water for Carrington, and the two are rescued. Forrester, still weak from the ordeal, is greeted by the base doctor who, upon giving him a quick examination, agrees to deliver him by jeep back to the waiting Anna. Forrester finds her asleep in her bed. He lies down beside her without waking her up and promptly falls asleep.

== Cast ==
- Gregory Peck as Squadron Leader Bill Forrester
- Win Min Than as Anna
- Maurice Denham as Flight Lieutenant Blore
- Lyndon Brook as Flying Officer Carrington (navigator)
- Brenda De Banzie as Miss McNab
- Bernard Lee as Dr. Harris
- Anthony Bushell as Wing Commander Aldridge
- Josephine Griffin as Mrs. Forrester
- Ram Gopal as Mr. Phang
- Dorothy Alison as Nurse
- Peter Arne as Flight Lieutenant
- Jack McNaughton as Sergeant Brown
- Lane Meddick as Radio operator
- Harold Siddons as Navigator Williams
- John A. Tinn as Burmese jeweler

== Production ==
The use of RAF de Havilland Mosquito aircraft provided an authentic detail to The Purple Plain although for flying sequences, as pictured here, models were used.

The Purple Plain is regarded generally as historically accurate with good production values and attention to detail, and depicts the native Burmese in a respectful manner. The film is based on the 1947 novel The Purple Plain by H. E. Bates who was commissioned into the RAF during World War II. It was one of three novels he wrote after his travels to Burma and India in 1945, on military assignment to write short pieces portraying the Burmese war for American readers. The novel was first serialised in the Saturday Evening Post in September and October 1947. The film script was written by novelist Eric Ambler in consultation with Bates.

The film was produced with a relatively modest budget by Two Cities Films, financed by Rank, and was directed by the American director Robert Parrish. The film was shot in Sigiriya, in what was then Ceylon (now Sri Lanka), and utilised several locations later used in The Bridge on the River Kwai. The aircraft in the film were repainted in accurate SEAC camouflage and markings, and were provided through the co-operation of the Royal Air Force, which also provided several staff on-site during the filming. Some of these are credited as extras.

Cinematographer Geoffrey Unsworth filmed the production at a time when the British film industry was changing over from 3-strip Technicolor to Eastmancolor. The Purple Plain is considered a "hybrid" film as the location filming in Ceylon was in Eastmancolor whilst the interiors at Pinewood Studios were in 3-strip Technicolor. Another known "hybrid" film of this period was To Paris with Love.

== Casting ==
Gregory Peck had not done a film in Hollywood for approximately four years, preferring the tax incentives of working outside the United States.

The original choice for Anna was June Rose, a Burmese royal princess of Australian descent and the great-granddaughter of Prince Kanaung. She pulled out during the shooting in Ceylon saying "It was so Hollywood, it was ridiculous; it was an insult to anything that had to do with Burma", adding "When the film did come to Burma there was a big hue and cry. Things in the pagoda, things a Buddhist would never do."

She was replaced by Win Min Than who was born Helga Johnston, the wife of Burmese politician and businessman Bo Setkya (1916–1969; aka Thakin Aung Than, Bo Set Kya or Set-kya), in her only film role. Her father was Australian and her mother Burmese. In 1964 she shaved her head and became a Buddhist nun in Rangoon, adopting the name Daw Wanthalamar. Her husband had fled the country, went underground, and had not been heard of since General Ne Win had taken over the country in March 1962. She left the convent a year later and went into business selling gourds. Both Bo Set Kya and Ne Win were members of the Thirty Comrades.

== Reception ==
The Purple Plain opened to solid reviews with Variety labeling it a "fine dramatic vehicle" that "vividly establishes the atmosphere",

=== Box office ===
The Purple Plain was successful at the box office, being the 11th most popular film in Britain in 1954. According to Kinematograph Weekly the film was a "money maker" at the British box office in 1954.

According to Variety it earned $1,300,000 in rentals in the US. However it was considered a commercial disappointment in the US.

=== Awards ===
It was ultimately nominated in the category of Best British film of 1954 at the 8th British Academy Film Awards, while actor Maurice Denham was nominated for the award for Best Actor in a Leading Role for his performance as Blore.
