= Passage of Arms =

1959 novel by Eric Ambler

- First edition cover
- Author: Eric Ambler
- Language: English
- Genre: Spy novel
- Publisher: Heinemann
- Publication date: 1959
- Publication place: United Kingdom
- OCLC: 4081070
- Preceded by: The Night-Comers
- Followed by: The Light of Day

Passage of Arms is a 1959 novel by Eric Ambler.

== Plot ==
Girija Krishnan, a bookkeeper at a rubber plantation in Malaya, has one ambition in life: to found and establish a local bus company and transport system. But he has no money to finance this endeavor.

The local authorities kill a gang of Communist terrorists near the plantation, and Girija realizes from the condition of their guns that their cache of weapons must be somewhere nearby. By slow, hard work and some good luck, he succeeds in finding it.

He waits several years until he can safely sell the weapons to a Chinese family of entrepreneurs centered in Singapore. Members of the family include the respectable businessman Tan Siow Mong, who runs the transport company which regularly exports the rubber plantation's crop; also the labor racketeer and compulsive gambler Tan Yam Heng, who always needs money; and the streetwise Tan Tak Chee.

When Girija sells the weapons to the Tan family, they realize that in order to re-sell them safely for profit, they need to find a respectable European or American foreigner who can take legal responsibility for the transfer of funds from the eventual buyer. They find Greg Nilsen and his wife Dorothy, a pair of naive American tourists from Delaware, who are taking a round-the-world cruise. A taxi-driver in Hong Kong called Khoo Ah Au ("Jimmy" to English-speaking tourists) recruits the Nilsens with a promise of a handsome fee for signing the transfers of inventory and money. Greg is happy to do so when Jimmy tells him that the weapons will be used to arm anti-Communist insurgents in Sumatra, but his enthusiasm wanes when he learns that in order to complete the transaction, he must travel in person to the Sumatran city of Labuanga and obtain the insurgent leader's signature.

Outnumbered by the insurgents, the military governor of Labuanga has allied himself with the local Communist organization. Greg, Dorothy, and their insurgent contacts are caught and imprisoned by Communist agents, who have been intercepting shipments of weapons and turning them over to the governor. The insurgents send a rescue force to attack the prison, and Greg and Dorothy manage to escape with the help of the local American and British consuls.

Back in Singapore, Greg wants to abandon the arms deal and go home. A cynical British official convinces him otherwise, saying that the insurgents should not be cheated of their weapons after saving Greg and Dorothy's lives. The official also prompts Greg to get a bit of revenge against the Tan family by leaving the payment for the weapons in the care of Yam Heng, who promptly loses most of it in irresponsible business dealings. Humbled but relieved, Greg and Dorothy return to Delaware.

Although he has been deprived of any profit from the arms consignment, Tan Siow Mong is still obliged to pay Girija for his part in the scheme. Girija accepts a business partnership in place of the money, and operates his new bus line as a division of Tan's shipping company.

== Context ==
The title is a double reference to the novel's plot and the expression a "passage of arms".

The Nilsens are an example of the recurrent "innocents abroad" theme that characterizes Ambler's novels.

== Reception ==
New York Times reviewer James M. Cain, also a thriller-writer in his own right, described the book as "... a picture of Southeast Asia, in all its color and the savagery of its current turmoil ... this is tops, and gets down to bedrock."

The book won the 1959 Gold Dagger award (then known as the "Crossed Red Herring Award").

== External sources ==
- Ambler, Eric (2000), Passage of Arms, London: Pan, ISBN 0-330-39620-X
- "Passage of Arms" Review in Things Asian. Retrieved 25 Jan 2009.
- "Eric Ambler" Bastulli Mystery Library. Retrieved 25 Jan 2009.
- Panek, Leroy L. (1981), The Special Branch: The British Spy Novel, 1890–1980, Bowling Green, Ohio: Bowling Green State University Popular Press, ISBN 0-87972-178-2
