= Danyal Topatan =

Turkish-Armenian actor (1916–1975)

- Born: Danyal Bayrı; 1916; Tarsus, Mersin, Ottoman Empire
- Died: September 26, 1975 (aged 58–59); Istanbul, Turkey
- Occupation: Actor
- Years active: 1950–1975

Danyal Topatan (1916 – September 26, 1975) was a Turkish-Armenian actor.

Topatan dropped out of his first year of middle school and entered the cinema with Dracula in Istanbul, which was filmed in 1953. He was known for his role in the film Topkapi. He acted in hundreds of different movies. Topatan died of lung cancer on 26 September 1975. He was buried at the Zincirlikuyu Cemetery.

== Selected filmography ==
- Çete (1950)
- Drakula İstanbul'da (1953)
- Beyaz Mendil (1955)
- Yangın (1956)
- Lejyon Dönüşü (1957)
- Meçhul Kahramanlar (1958)
- Funda (1958)
- Alageyik (1958)
- Tütün Zamanı (1959)
- Karacaoğlan'ın Kara Sevdası (1959)
- Üsküdar İskelesi (1960)
- Divane (1960)
- Oğlum (1961)
- İki Yetime (1961)
- Acı Zeytin (1961)
- Sevimli Haydut (1961)
- Mor Sevda (1961)
- Kadın Asla Unutmaz (1961)
- Can Mustafa (Yaralı Kuş) (1961)
- Bir Haydutu Sevdim (1962) (also served as writer and director)
- Harmandalı Efem Geliyor (1962)
- Cehenneme Çevrilen Cennet (1962)
- Seni Bekleyeceğim (1962)
- Ölüme Yalnız Gidilir (1962)
- Vahşi Kedi (1962)
- İki Gemi Yan Yana (1963)
- Sabah Olmasın (1963)
- Çapkın Kız (1963)
- Keşanli Ali Destanı (1964)
- Duvarlarin Ötesi (1964)
- Ağaçlar Ayakta Ölür (1964)
- Koçero (1964)
- Sahildeki Ceset (1964)
- Abidik Gubidik (1964)
- Erkek Ali (1964)
- Gurbet Kuşları (1964)
- Topkapi (1964)
- Günah Kadınları (1964)
- Muradın Türküsü (1965)
- Sayılı Dakikalar (1965)
- Şeytanın Kurbanları (1965)
- Yaralı Kartal (1965)
- Yahya Peygamber (1965)
- Sayılı Kabadayılar (1965)
- Kasımpaşalı Recep (1965)
- Artık Düşman Değiliz (1965)
- Krallar Kralı (1965)
- Korkusuzlar (1965)
- Dağların Oğlu (1965)
- Haracıma Dokunma (1965)
- Aşkım Silahımdır (1965)
- Yalancı (1965)
- Karaoğlan-Altay'dan Gelen Yiğit (1965)
- Akrep Kuyruğu (1965)
- İçimizdeki Boşluk (1965)
- Son Darbe (1965)
- Silahların Kanunu (1966)
- Seni Seviyorum (1966)
- Kibar Haydut (Yalnız Adam) (1966)
- At Avrat Silah (1966)
- Bir Millet Uyanıyor (1966)
- Hazreti Süleyman ve Saba Melikesi (1966)
- Yedi Dağın Aslanı (1966)
- Hudutların Kanunu (1966)
- Karaoğlan - Camoka'nın İntikamı (1966)
- Ölmeyen Aşk (1966)
- Kanun Benim (1966)
- Arslanların Dönüşü (1966)
- Senede Bir Gün (1966)
- Namusum İçin (1966)
- Ah Güzel İstanbul (1966)
- Killing Caniler Kralı (1967)
- Eşkiya Celladı (1967)
- Balatlı Arif (1967)
- Şark Yıldızı (1967)
- Bizansı Titreten Yiğit (1967)
- Kozanoğlu (1967)
- Düşman Aşıklar (1967)
- Gecelerin Kralı (1967)
- Krallar Ölmez (1967)
- Harun Reşid'in Gözdesi (1967)
- Benim Adım Kerim (1967)
- Kuduz Recep (1967)
- Silahları Ellerinde Öldüler (1967)
- At Hırsızı Banus (1967)
- Sürtüğün Kızı (1967)
- Şeyh Ahmet (1968)
- Maskeli Beşlerin Dönüşü (1968)
- Camoka'nın Dönüsü (1968)
- Maskeli Beşler (1968)
- Kaçak (1968)
- Pire Nuri (1968)
- Kızıl Maske (1968)
- İngiliz Kemal (1968)
- Seyyit Han (1968)
- Abbase Sultan (1968)
- Zorro'nun İntikamı (1969)
- Dişi Eşkıya (1969)
- Zorro Kamçılı Süvari (1969)
- Beyaz Mendilim (1969)
- Vatansızlar (1969)
- Fosforlu Cevriye (1969)
- Tarkan Camoka'ya Karşı (1969)
- Ebu Müslim Horasanı (1969)
- Çile (1969)
- Çakırcalı Mehmet Efe (1969)
- Serseri Kabadayı (1969)
- Demir Pençe (Korsan Adam) (1969)
- Tarkan (1969)
- Köprüden Geçti Gelin (1969)
- Daga Çıkan Kız (1969)
- Fato - Ya İstiklal Ya Ölüm (1969)
- Günahını Ödeyen Kadın (1969)
- Demir Pençe Casuslar Savaşı (1969)
- Çifte Tabancalı Kabadayı (1969)
- Ringo Vadiler Aslanı (1969)
- Yayla Kızı Gül Ayşe (1969)
- Yaşamak İçin Öldüreceksin (1970)
- Linç (1970)
- Canlı Hedef (Kızım İçin) (1970)
- On Kadına Bir Erkek (1970)
- Kiralık Katiller (1970)
- Yemen'de Bir Avuç Türk (1970)
- Piyade Osman (1970)
- Kralların Öfkesi (1970)
- Erkeklik Öldü mü Abiler (1970)
- Öksüz Gülnaz (1970)
- Yedi Belalılar (1970)
- Yanık Kezban (1970)
- Casus Kıran - Yedi Canlı Adam (1970)
- Altın Tabancalı Adam (1970)
- Tarkan: Gümüş Eyer (1970)
- Erkek Gibi Ölenler (1970)
- İki Cesur Adam (1970)
- Ceylan Emine (1970)
- Çeko (1970)
- Şeytana Uyduk Bir Kere (1971)
- Kara Cellat (1971)
- Malkoçoğlu Ölüm Fedaileri (1971)
- İpini Boynunda Bil (1971)
- Bir Teselli Ver (1971)
- Gelin Kız (1971)
- Belanın Kralı (1971)
- Hayat Cehennemi - Hiç (1971)
- Vurguncular (1971)
- Keloğlan ve Yedi Cüceler (1971)
- Önce Sev Sonra Öldür (1971)
- Üç Kızgın Cengaver (1971)
- İntikam Kartalları (1971)
- Çirkin ve Cesur (1971)
- Baybars, Asyanin Tek Atlısı (1971)
- İşte Deve İşte Hendek (1971)
- Ölmeyen Adam (1971)
- Cemo (1972)
- Süper Adam İstanbul'da (1972)
- Allahaısmarladık Katil (1972)
- Adanalı Kardeşler (1972)
- Öldüren Örümcek (1972)
- Bitirim (1972)
- Sabu Hırsızlar Prensi (1972)
- Benimle Sevişir Misin? (1972)
- Kan ve Kin (1972)
- Irmak (1972)
- Mevlana (1973)
- Kambur (1973)
- Dağ Kurdu (1973)
- Kara Şeytan (1973)
- Büyük Bela (1973)
- Destan (1973)
- Çirkin Dünya (1974)
- Yaşar Ne Yaşar Ne Yaşamaz (1974)
- Tokmak Nuri (1975)
- Delisin (1975)
- La cloche tibétaine (1975, TV Series)
