= Background to Danger =

1943 film by Raoul Walsh

- Theatrical release poster
- Directed by: Raoul Walsh
- Written by: W.R. Burnett
- Based on: Uncommon Danger; 1937 novel by Eric Ambler
- Produced by: Jerry Wald
- Starring: George Raft; Brenda Marshall; Sydney Greenstreet; Peter Lorre
- Cinematography: Tony Gaudio
- Edited by: Jack Killifer
- Music by: Frederick Hollander
- Distributed by: Warner Bros. Pictures
- Release date: July 3, 1943
- Running time: 80 minutes
- Country: United States
- Language: English
- Box office: $1.3 million (US rentals)

Background to Danger is a 1943 World War II spy thriller film directed by Raoul Walsh. It stars George Raft with Brenda Marshall, Sydney Greenstreet, and Peter Lorre.

Based on the 1937 novel Uncommon Danger by Eric Ambler and set in politically neutral Turkey, the screenplay was credited to W. R. Burnett, although William Faulkner and Daniel Fuchs also contributed.

The film was designed to capitalize on the runaway success of Casablanca, which had also featured Lorre and Greenstreet. The Russian operative positively portrayed by Brenda Marshall shows an exaggerated degree of cooperation, and the film has a slight pro-Soviet bias akin to Warner Bros.' Mission to Moscow from the same year.

Walsh called the film "a quickie".

== Plot ==
In 1942, Nazi Germany attempts to bring neutral Turkey into the war on its side by staging an assassination attempt on Franz von Papen, its ambassador to the country. Much to the annoyance of Colonel Robinson (Sydney Greenstreet), von Papen survives and the Russians that his agent provocateur was trying to frame have solid alibis, forcing him to turn to another scheme to inflame Turkey's traditional rivalry with Russia.

American machinery salesman, Joe Barton, (George Raft) boards the Baghdad–Istanbul Express train at Aleppo and is attracted to another passenger, Ana Remzi (Osa Massen). Worried about being searched by customs agents once they reach the Turkish border, she asks Joe to hold on to an envelope containing some securities, all that remains of her inheritance. Joe obliges but when he later examines the envelope, he finds maps of Turkey with handwritten annotations on them.

When they stop in Ankara, he goes to her hotel to return her property, only to find she has been fatally wounded. He hides when someone else approaches the room. He watches unobserved as Soviet spy Nikolai Zaleshoff (Peter Lorre) searches the dead woman's luggage. Then, Joe exits through the window. Leaving the scene, he is seen by Tamara Zaleshoff (Brenda Marshall), Nikolai's sister and partner in espionage.

Turkish policemen take Joe in for questioning but they are German agents. They take him to their leader, Colonel Robinson, who wants the maps. Joe refuses to cooperate and is taken away to be interrogated by Mailler (Kurt Katch). Before the Germans get very far, Joe is rescued by Nikolai. When the Zaleshoffs reveal that they are Soviet agents, Joe agrees to fetch them the documents. Unfortunately, he finds his hotel room has been ransacked and the documents stolen.

Joe, it turns out, is also a spy (for the United States). When he reports to his boss, McNamara (Willard Robertson), he is assigned an assistant, Hassan (Turhan Bey). The two men head to Istanbul. There, Robinson has bribed a newspaper publisher to print an article claiming that the documents are secret Russian plans for the invasion of Turkey. When Joe barges in by himself, he is quickly taken prisoner. The Zaleshoffs have also been captured. Joe and Tamara get away, but Nikolai is killed during the escape.

Joe kidnaps a German embassy official and learns where Robinson has gone. Joe heads to the newspaper, where he forces the Nazi ringleader at gunpoint to burn the maps. Robinson is handed over to the Turkish police and then to his greatly displeased superior. He departs by airplane, knowing he is doomed for his failure. Joe and Tamara head to Cairo for their next assignments.

== Cast ==
- George Raft as Joe Barton
- Brenda Marshall as Tamara Zaleshoff
- Sydney Greenstreet as Col. Robinson
- Peter Lorre as Nikolai Zaleshoff
- Osa Massen as Ana Remzi
- Turhan Bey as Hassan
- Willard Robertson as "Mac" McNamara
- Kurt Katch as Mailler

== Production ==
=== Development ===
The film was based on the 1937 novel Uncommon Danger by Eric Ambler. It was published in the US under the title Background to Danger.

Film rights were bought by Warner Bros. The film was going to star Jeffrey Lynn then he was withdrawn and replaced by Ronald Reagan and Jane Wyman. Lewis Seiler then Jo Graham was assigned to direct. Philip MacDonald was assigned to write the script.

=== George Raft ===
In June 1942, the film became a star vehicle for George Raft. It was Raft's first film for Warners since Manpower. He had turned down a number of movies at the studio including The Maltese Falcon and All Through the Night. Raft insisted on the script being changed so that his character was an undercover American agent instead of an ordinary man. This was common behavior from Raft at the time.

Writer W.R. Burnett, who had also written Scarface said "I was always afraid that I'd have to face Eric Ambler after what we did to that. The point of Background to Danger was that this man was a salesman and suddenly things begin to happen to him that he can't understand. And he gets involved in all this espionage. But Raft wouldn't do it unless he was an FBI man. The whole story went out the window... He said he didn't want to be any ribbon salesman. I think he wanted to be on the side of the law for a change."

John Collier was brought in to work on the script.

Jerry Wald was assigned to produce and Raoul Walsh to direct.

=== Shooting ===
Filming started September 1942. In November 1942 Raft would buy out his contract with Warners.

== Reception ==
The film was a box office success.
