= Epitaph for a Spy (1953 TV series) =

- Based on: Epitaph for a Spy by Eric Ambler
- Written by: Giles Cooper
- Directed by: Patrick Harvey
- Starring: Peter Cushing; Vivienne Burgess; Warren Stanhope
- Theme music composer: James Hartley
- Country of origin: United Kingdom
- Original language: English
- No. of series: 1
- No. of episodes: 6

Production
- Producer: Stephen Harrison
- Running time: 30m per episode
- Production company: BBC

Original release
- Release: 14 March – 18 April 1953

Epitaph for a Spy is a 1953 BBC television series. It is based on the novel by Eric Ambler.

== Episodes ==
- "Arrest" – 14 March 1953
- "Go Spy the Land" – 21 March 1953
- "Violence" – 28 March 1953
- "Ultimatum" – 4 April 1953
- "All Men Are Liars" – 11 April 1953
- "Epitaph" – 18 April 1953

== Cast ==
- Peter Cushing as Josef Vadassey
- Vivienne Burgess as Odette Martin
- Warren Stanhope as Warren Skelton
- Philip Leaver as M. Beghin
- Robert Webber as Duclos
- Joan Winmill Brown as Mary Skelton
- Philip Dale as Roux
- Ferdy Mayne as Köche
- Gerik Schjelderup as Schimler
- Maurice Colbourne as Major Clandon-Hartley
- Meinhart Maur as Herr Vogel
- Liselotte Goettinger as Frau Vogel
- Raf De La Torre as Detective
- Sybil Rares as Mrs. Clandon-Hartley
- James Beattie as Waiter
- Arthur Goullet as M. Mathis
- Tom Webster as Policeman
- James Ottaway as Café waiter
- John Vere as Chemist
- John Dunbar as Commissaire
- Lee Fox as Sergeant
- Yvonne Andre as Mlle. Boussois
- Harold Jamieson as Policeman
- Barry Phelps as Maletti
