= Eric Ambler =

English writer (1909–1998)

Eric Ambler OBE
- Born: Eric Clifford Ambler; 28 June 1909; London, England
- Died: 23 October 1998 (aged 89); London, England
- Occupation: Author
- Spouses: Louise Crombie (m. 1939; div. 1958) Joan Harrison (m. 1958; died 1994)
- Writing career
- Genres: Thrillers, spy novels

Eric Clifford Ambler OBE (28 June 1909 – 23 October 1998) was an English author of thrillers, in particular spy novels. Also working as a screenwriter, Ambler used the pseudonym Eliot Reed for books written with Charles Rodda. Ambler is notable for his novel The Light of Day (1962), which won the Edgar Allan Poe Award for Best Novel in 1964 and which was adapted into film as Topkapi (1964).

== Life ==
Ambler was born in Charlton, South-East London, into a family of entertainers who ran a puppet show, with which he helped in his early years. Both parents also worked as music hall artists. He later studied engineering at the Northampton Polytechnic Institute in Islington (now City, University of London) and served a traineeship with an engineering company. However, his upbringing as an entertainer proved dominant, and he soon moved to writing plays and other works.

By the early 1930s, he was a copywriter at an advertising agency in London. After resigning, he moved to Paris, where he met and in 1939 married Louise Crombie, an American fashion correspondent.

Ambler was then politically a staunch antifascist and, like many others, tended to regard the Soviet Union as the only real counterweight to fascist aggression. He expressed this viewpoint in some of his early books. These included Soviet agents who were depicted positively and as sympathetic characters, the undoubted allies of the protagonist.

Like numerous like-minded people in different countries, Ambler was shocked and disillusioned by the German–Soviet Pact of 1939. More than a decade later, his postwar anticommunist novel Judgment on Deltchev (1951), based on the Stalinist purge trials in Eastern Europe, resulted in him being reviled by many former Communist Party and other progressive associates.

When the Second World War broke out, Ambler entered the army as a private soldier. He was commissioned into the Royal Artillery in 1941. He was soon reassigned to photographic units. He ended the war as a lieutenant-colonel and an assistant director of the Army Film and Photographic Unit.

After the war, he worked in the civilian film industry as a screenwriter.

He did not resume writing under his own name until 1951, when he entered the second of his two distinct periods in his writing. He was elected to the Detection Club in 1952, the first member to primarily write thrillers rather than traditional Golden Age detective novels.

Ambler divorced Crombie in May 1958. That same year he married British-born Joan Harrison, a film producer, screenwriter and associate of Alfred and Alma Hitchcock.

The couple moved to Switzerland in 1969. They did not return to Britain to live for 16 years. Harrison died in 1994 in London. Ambler died in London on 23 October 1998.

In 2008, Ambler's estate transferred all of his copyrights and other legal and commercial rights to Owatonna Media. It sold the copyrights to Coolabi Plc in 2009 but retained a master licence in radio and audio rights. These rights are commercially licensed in the UK and abroad.

== Writing career ==
Five of Ambler's six early works are regarded as classic thrillers.

Among Ambler's most notable works is The Mask of Dimitrios (1939) (published in the US under the title A Coffin for Dimitrios). It was adapted as a film titled The Mask of Dimitrios in 1944. Also notable was The Light of Day (1962), adapted as the 1964 film Topkapi.

In contrast to most spy novels published before his works, the protagonists in Ambler's novels are rarely professional spies, policemen, or counterintelligence operatives. They are usually amateurs who find themselves unwillingly in the company of hardened criminals, revolutionaries or spies. The protagonist usually begins out of his depth, but eventually manages to surprise himself as well as the professionals with decisive actions that outwit his far more experienced opponents.

That plot is used, for example, in Journey into Fear, Epitaph for a Spy, The Mask of Dimitrios, The Night-Comers/State of Siege, Passage of Arms, The Light of Day, Dirty Story, The Levanter and Doctor Frigo.

Another recurring plot element is statelessness and exile: characters who are exiled from their homelands or who face the danger of being exiled and not granted residence in any country.

Ambler was also a successful screenwriter and lived in Los Angeles in his later years. Other classic movies based on his work include Journey into Fear (1943), starring Joseph Cotten, and an original screenplay, The October Man (1947).

He received an Academy Award nomination for his work on the film The Cruel Sea (1953), adapted from the novel by Nicholas Monsarrat.

He wrote the screenplay for A Night to Remember about the sinking of the Titanic, along with many other screenplays, particularly those concerning stories and adventures at sea.

Ambler published his autobiography in 1985, Here Lies. He created the 1960 American detective TV series Checkmate.

== Reception and influence ==
Many authors of international thrillers have acknowledged a debt to Ambler, including Graham Greene, Ian Fleming, John le Carré, Julian Symons, Alan Furst and Frederick Forsyth.

== Works ==
=== Novels ===
- The Dark Frontier (1936)
- Uncommon Danger (1937), US title: Background to Danger
- Epitaph for a Spy (1938)
- Cause for Alarm (1938)
- The Mask of Dimitrios (1939), US title: A Coffin for Dimitrios
- Journey into Fear (1940)
- Judgment on Deltchev (1951)
- The Schirmer Inheritance (1953)
- The Night-Comers (1956), also published as State of Siege
- Passage of Arms (1959); Gold Dagger Award
- The Light of Day (1962), also published as Topkapi; Edgar Award for Best Novel, 1964
- A Kind of Anger (1964)
- Dirty Story (1967), also published as This Gun For Hire
- The Intercom Conspiracy (1969), also published as The Quiet Conspiracy
- The Levanter (1972); Gold Dagger Award
- Doctor Frigo (1974)
- Send No More Roses (1977), US title: The Siege of the Villa Lipp
- The Care of Time (1981)

=== Short stories and non-fiction ===
- The Ability to Kill: and Other Pieces (1963). Published with a chapter on John Bodkin Adams removed because of libel concerns.
- To Catch A Spy, as editor (1964). An anthology of stories.
- "Michelin" in Crime Without Murder (1970), edited by Dorothy Salisbury Davis.
- Here Lies: An Autobiography (1985). Edgar Award for Best Critical/Biographical Work, 1987.
- Waiting for Orders (1991). Contains eight stories mostly written in 1939–40 while Ambler awaited his call to military duty:
  1. "The Intrusions of Dr. Czissar". Six ingenious detective stories featuring Dr. Jan Czissar, a refugee Czech detective formerly of the Prague police.
  2. "The Army of the Shadows". A suspense story about an English surgeon travelling in the Swiss Alps who becomes entangled in the intrigues of pre-war anti-Nazis.
  3. "The Blood Bargain". A suspense story about a Latin American dictator who cleverly gains his release from insurgents but then finds exile extremely dangerous.
- The Story so Far: Memories and Other Fictions (1993). Nine autobiographical stories covering different periods of Ambler's life.

=== Short stories (first publication) ===
- "The Army of the Shadows" (1939) in The Queen's Book of the Red Cross

=== As Eliot Reed (with Charles Rodda) ===
- Skytip (1950)
- Tender to Danger (1951), also published as Tender to Moonlight
- The Maras Affair (1953)
- Charter to Danger (1954)
- Passport to Panic (1958)

=== Film screenplays ===
- The New Lot (1943)
- The Way Ahead (1944)
- The October Man (1947)
- The Passionate Friends (1949, based on the novel The Passionate Friends by H. G. Wells)
- Highly Dangerous (1950)
- The Clouded Yellow (uncredited) (1950, screenplay by Janet Green)
- The Magic Box (1951)
- Encore (1951, based on short stories by W. Somerset Maugham)
- The Promoter also known as The Card (1952, based on the novel The Card by Arnold Bennett)
- The Cruel Sea (1953, based on the novel The Cruel Sea by Nicholas Monsarrat)
- Shoot First also known as Rough Shoot (1953, based on a novel by Geoffrey Household)
- The Purple Plain (1954, based on the novel The Purple Plain by H. E. Bates)
- Lease of Life (1954)
- Yangtse Incident: The Story of H.M.S. Amethyst (1957, based on a non-fiction book by Lawrence Earl)
- A Night to Remember (1958, based on the non-fiction book A Night to Remember by Walter Lord)
- The Wreck of the Mary Deare (1959, based on the novel The Wreck of the Mary Deare by Hammond Innes)
- Mutiny on the Bounty (uncredited) (1962)

=== Television ===
- Checkmate (1960) television series
- Alfred Hitchcock Presents: Act of Faith (TV episode, 1962)
- Love Hate Love (TV movie, 1970)

== Film adaptations ==
- Journey into Fear (1943, based on the novel Journey into Fear)
- Background to Danger (1943, based on the novel Uncommon Danger)
- Hotel Reserve (1944, based on the novel Epitaph for a Spy)
- The Mask of Dimitrios (1944, based on the novel The Mask of Dimitrios)
- Epitaph for a Spy (1953, TV miniseries based on the novel Epitaph for a Spy)
- Climax!: Epitaph for a Spy (1954, TV series episode based on the novel Epitaph for a Spy)
- Climax!: Journey into Fear (1956, TV series episode based on the novel Journey into Fear)
- The Schirmer Inheritance (1957, TV miniseries based on the novel The Schirmer Inheritance)
- Moment of Fear: A Touch of Guilt (1960, TV series episode based on the novel Judgment on Deltchev)
- Epitaph for a Spy (1963, TV miniseries based on the novel Epitaph for a Spy)
- Topkapi (1964, based on the novel The Light of Day)
- Journey into Fear: Seller's Market (1966, unaired TV pilot)
- Journey into Fear (1975, based on the novel Journey into Fear)
- Ricatto internazionale (Italy, 1980, TV miniseries based on the novel The Intercom Conspiracy)
- Eine Art von Zorn (West Germany, 1984, based on the novel A Kind of Anger)
- A Quiet Conspiracy (1989, TV miniseries based on the novel The Intercom Conspiracy)
- The Care of Time (1990, based on the novel The Care of Time)

== Literature ==
- Ronald J. Ambrosetti: Eric Ambler. New York: Twayne Publ. u.a. 1994. (= Twayne's English authors series; 507) ISBN 0-8057-8369-5.
- Peter Lewis: Eric Ambler. New York: Continuum 1990. ISBN 0-8264-0444-8
- Snyder, Robert Lance. "Eric Ambler's Revisionist Thrillers: Epitaph for a Spy, A Coffin for Dimitrios, and The Intercom Conspiracy." Papers on Language & Literature 45 (Summer 2009): 227–60.
- Snyder, Robert Lance. "'The Jungles of International Bureaucracy': Criminality and Detection in Eric Ambler's The Siege of the Villa Lipp." Connotations: A Journal for Critical Debate 20.2–3 (2010/2011): 272–88.
- Snyder, Robert Lance. The Art of Indirection in British Espionage Fiction: A Critical Study of Six Novelists. Jefferson, NC: McFarland, 2011.
- Snyder, Robert Lance. "Ethnography, Doubling, and Equivocal Narration in Eric Ambler's The Levanter." The CEA Critic 77.1 (2015): 58–70.
- Snyder, Robert Lance. "Transforming the Thriller: Narrative Deferral and 'Second-Wave Terrorism' in Eric Ambler's The Care of Time." South Atlantic Review 82.2 (2017): 136–53.
- Snyder, Robert Lance. Eric Ambler's Novels: Critiquing Modernity. Lanham, MD: Lexington Books, 2020.
- (in German) Eric Ambler, edited by the Filmkritiker-Kooperative. München: Verlag Filmkritik 1982. (= Filmkritik; Jg. 26, 1982, H. 12 = Gesamtfolge; 312).
- (in German) Gerd Haffmans (ed.): Über Eric Ambler. Zeugnisse von Alfred Hitchcock bis Helmut Heissenbüttel. Zürich: Diogenes 1989. (= Diogenes-TB; 20607) ISBN 3-257-20607-0.
- (in German) Stefan Howald: Eric Ambler. Eine Biographie. Zürich: Diogenes 2002. ISBN 3-257-06325-3
- Bernhard Valentinitsch, Historisch-politische Hintergründe in Eric Amblers Politthriller 'The Levanter'.In: JIPSS(= Journal for Intelligence, Propaganda and Security Studies).1/2013.Graz 2013, p. 7–23.
