= The Intercom Conspiracy =

1969 novel by Eric Ambler

- First edition (US)
- Author: Eric Ambler
- Language: English
- Publisher: Weidenfeld & Nicolson (UK); Atheneum Books (US)
- Publication date: 1969
- Publication place: United Kingdom
- Media type: Print
- ISBN: 9780307950062
- OCLC: 24642
- Preceded by: Dirty Story
- Followed by: The Levanter

The Intercom Conspiracy is a novel by British thriller writer Eric Ambler, first published in 1969. It was adapted for television as A Quiet Conspiracy.

== Plot ==
Two senior military officers from unnamed minor north European countries are sent as liaison officers to the NATO Headquarters. Both have a distinguished record in the WWII Anti-Nazi Resistance and are highly regarded in their own countries, but they discover that at NATO they are complete non-entities and the Americans never bother to listen to anything they say. Increasingly fed up and angry, the two hatch a scheme whereby they would be avenged on the arrogant Americans and at the same time gain a tidy sum for their approaching retirement. When the owner of an extreme right-wing weekly magazine, Intercom, dies, they buy the company which publishes it. Acting through a fictional intermediary, they start sending the surprised editor "articles", which consist of highly sensitive information about the weapons systems of the USA, USSR, Britain and NATO. Before the fourth "article" has even been published the magazine's lawyer is contacted by a potential buyer. The two intelligence heads have correctly calculated that the security services of the nations they're mentioning in their "articles" will pay handsomely to close the magazine down. To the magazine's lawyer's amazement, the buyer is prepared to pay $500,000. The sale is quickly carried through, the magazine closed down, and all its assets mysteriously removed. The intelligence heads divide their takings and start planning for a comfortable retirement.

The text takes the form of notes for a book about the affair which a publisher has commissioned from the noted historian-turned-thriller writer, Charles Latimer. Latimer has mysteriously disappeared and the reader is left to read through the notes of his interviews with various people and officials involved in the affair, their telegrams and letters, as well as his imaginative "narrative reconstructions" of important scenes.

The majority of the events are seen through the eyes of Intercom's editor, Theodore Carter. For years he had worked for the magazine's founder and owner, a retired American general who was a rabid Cold Warrior, translating whatever new conspiracy theories The General thought up into more or less coherent articles and sending them to an eclectic mailing list. When Carter starts publishing articles from the new owners, he soon finds himself in trouble. He receives mysterious phone calls, then an intimidating visit from two "journalists" who he thinks are from the CIA. He is then kidnapped, taken to an apartment and threatened by unknown agents, before being released. Returning to his office to retrieve the key documents, Carter disturbs burglars and is knocked out with some kind of nerve gas. When he regains consciousness, he leaves the office only to encounter the CIA agents coming up the stairs. He barges past them, jumps into his car and drives off in such a panic that he crashes and ends up in hospital. The authorities refuse to believe his account of events just long enough for the magazine sale to be completed and the two security chiefs to get their money.

In the final chapter, Carter, now recovered, visits the Majorca home of the missing Latimer and discovers that one of the intelligence chiefs had become his neighbour, living in a fine villa, driving a new sports car and accompanied by an attractive young woman. He pieces together what must have happened: over sociable drinks the chief let slip a little too much to Latimer who, with his scholarly and literary skills, began to piece together the true story of the Intercom conspiracy. The other intelligence chief, not yet retired and suffering from illness, decides to eliminate Latimer. He is never seen again, leaving behind the folder of notes and texts which we have just read.

== Context ==
The character Charles Latimer also features in The Mask of Dimitrios.

The book's structure was described by The Guardian as "postmodern".

== TV adaptation ==
The novel was adapted for television in 1980 as the Italian "Ricatto internazionale". In 1989 it was adapted for television as "A Quiet Conspiracy", a four-part series for the UK's ITV network, starring Joss Ackland as Theodore Carter.

== See also ==
- Hilaire du Berrier
