= Topkapi (film) =

1964 film by Jules Dassin

- Theatrical release poster
- Directed by: Jules Dassin
- Screenplay by: Monja Danischewsky
- Based on: The Light of Day by Eric Ambler
- Produced by: Jules Dassin
- Starring: Melina Mercouri; Peter Ustinov; Maximilian Schell; Robert Morley; Akim Tamiroff
- Cinematography: Henri Alekan
- Edited by: Roger Dwyre
- Music by: Manos Hatzidakis
- Production company: Filmways
- Distributed by: United Artists
- Release date: September 2, 1964
- Running time: 120 minutes
- Country: United States
- Language: English
- Box office: $7 million

Topkapi is a 1964 American heist comedy film produced and directed by Jules Dassin from a screenplay by Monja Danischewsky, based on the 1962 novel The Light of Day by Eric Ambler. Produced by Filmways and distributed by United Artists, the film stars Melina Mercouri, Peter Ustinov, Maximilian Schell, Robert Morley, and Akim Tamiroff. The plot follows a small-time con artist who gets roped into helping a gang of international art thieves steal an emerald-encrusted dagger from Istanbul's Topkapı Palace, while he is simultaneously forced to spy on them for the Turkish police.

The music score was by Manos Hadjidakis, the cinematography by Henri Alekan, and the costume design by Denny Vachlioti. For his performance, Ustinov won his second Academy Award for Best Supporting Actor.

== Plot ==
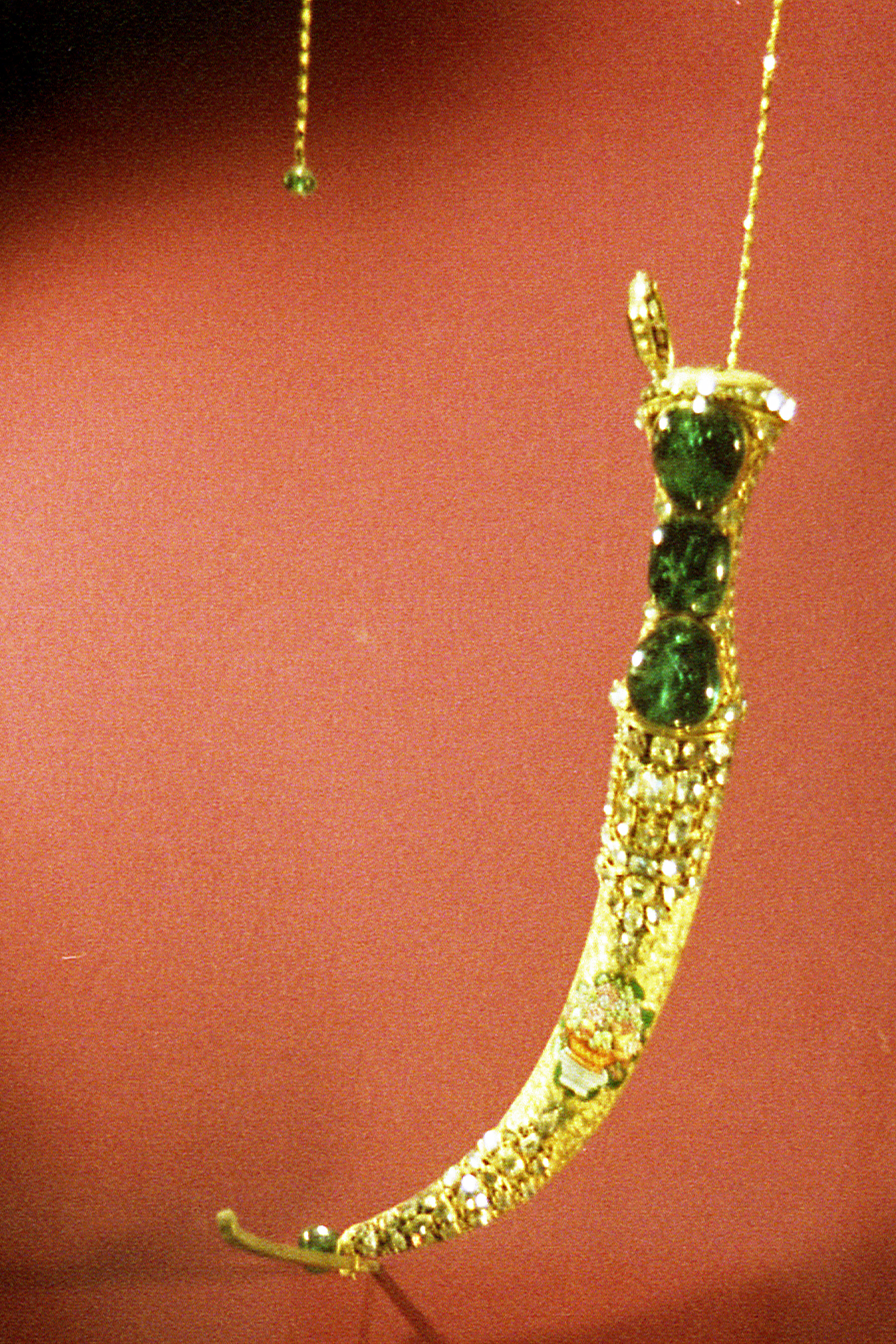
The real dagger of Mahmud I

Jewel thief Elizabeth Lipp visits Istanbul, where she sees a traveling fair featuring replicas of treasures from the Topkapı Palace. She then cases the Topkapı, fascinated by the emerald-encrusted dagger of Sultan Mahmud I. Leaving Turkey for Paris, she recruits a former lover, Swiss criminal mastermind Walter Harper, to plan a theft of the dagger. At Walter's urging, they assemble a group of amateurs with no criminal history: Cedric Page, master of all things mechanical; Giulio, a mute acrobat known as the "Human Fly"; and the burly Hans Fischer, who will provide the muscle needed for the job.

In Kavala, Greece, Elizabeth and Walter hire small-time hustler Arthur Simon Simpson to drive a rented car across the border into Istanbul to transport hidden explosives and firearms for use in the heist. Simpson, unaware of Elizabeth and Walter's plans, is caught with the firearms at the border and detained by Turkish Customs officials on suspicion of plotting a terrorist attack at an upcoming military parade. Major Ali Tufan recruits Simpson to spy on Elizabeth and Walter for the Turkish police. Cedric, picking up the car in Istanbul, is told by a policeman that only the person who brought the car into the country is legally allowed to drive it. While traveling with the gang, Simpson surreptitiously drops messages hidden inside empty cigarette packs for his police handlers.

The gang's plan is to enter the Treasury of the Topkapı Palace from the roof through an upper window, with Hans lowering Giulio on a rope so the latter can steal the dagger and replace it with a replica without touching the floor, which has a built-in alarm system, while Walter uses a rope to lift the large glass case that encloses the dagger. However, Hans' hands are injured in a scuffle with the drunken cook, Gerven, and Simpson is enlisted as a substitute, prompting him to accidentally confess that he has been working undercover for the Turkish police. Knowing they face arrest if they try to escape Turkey or use their equipment, Walter improvises a new plan in which they will elude the still-oblivious police and steal the dagger without using their weapons. They will then "surrender" to the police, and claim to have found explosives in their car.

To establish an alibi as they are tailed by the police, the gang attends a crowded Turkish wrestling match, during which Walter, Simpson, and Giulio slip away to the Topkapı Palace. That evening, while Elizabeth and Cedric distract a lighthouse keeper and change the timing of the searchlight that illuminates the Treasury's wall, Walter, Simpson, and Giulio successfully steal the dagger. Unnoticed by the thieves, a bird flies in through the window during the heist and becomes trapped inside the room just before Giulio closes the window. The gang members deliver the dagger to Joseph, proprietor of the traveling fair display, who will smuggle it out of Turkey.

The gang goes to police headquarters to "reveal" their discovery of weapons in the car. The inspector asks Simpson to vouch for Elizabeth and Walter's whereabouts that day. Simpson, seeming to waver, confirms their alibi. Before the police release Simpson and the others, the trapped bird in the Topkapı triggers the alarm, alerting police officers across Istanbul. When word of the Topkapı alarm reaches the police, Major Tufan confronts the thieves, displaying Simpson's last message, which has just enough information to link all of them to the heist. Tufan informs the gang that he knows why they were in Turkey: "A little bird told me", he says.

Ultimately, the gang is sent to a Turkish prison, where Elizabeth devises a new scheme to steal the Russian Imperial Crown Jewels in the Kremlin. Some time later, the gang, having seemingly escaped from jail, walks in the snow in a Russian city.

== Cast ==
- Melina Mercouri as Elizabeth Lipp
- Peter Ustinov as Arthur Simon Simpson
- Maximilian Schell as Walter Harper
- Robert Morley as Cedric Page
- Jess Hahn as Hans Fisher
- Gilles Ségal as Giulio
- Akim Tamiroff as Gerven
- Titos Vandis (credited as Titos Wandis) as Harback
- Ege Ernart as Major Ali Tufan
- Senih Orkan as first shadow
- Ahmet Danyal Topatan as second shadow
- Joe Dassin (credited as Joseph Dassin) as Joseph
- Despo Diamantidou as Voula
- Jules Dassin as Turkish policeman at the Istanbul Hilton (uncredited)

== Production ==
Ambler's novel is different from the film on several counts. The book is narrated by Simpson (named Arthur Abdel Simpson), so the reader only gradually comes to work out what Harper and his associates are really up to. Simpson in the book is blackmailed into driving the car to Istanbul after Harper catches him trying to steal Harper's travelers' checks. The book features frequent flashbacks to Simpson's schooldays in England, which help to explain his character and motives more clearly than in the film.

According to Jules Dassin, he originally planned to cast Peter Sellers as Simpson, but Sellers refused to work with Maximilian Schell, who he claimed had a reputation for being difficult. Dassin was not prepared to dispense with Schell, and so cast Ustinov in place of Sellers. Ustinov won the Academy Award for Best Supporting Actor for his portrayal of Simpson. It was his second win in the category, having won four years previously for his work in Spartacus.

Appearing in supporting roles were Gilles Ségal as the "Human Fly" and Joe Dassin as Joseph, who runs the traveling fair display that is supposed to smuggle the dagger out of Turkey. The athletic Ségal later inspired other "trickwire" stunts, including a few used for the Mission: Impossible television series and film. Joe Dassin was the son of the film's director Jules Dassin, and appeared as an actor in a handful of films, but was better known as a singer-songwriter.

Principal photography began on August 12, 1963. The majority of location filming was completed in Istanbul, Turkey, with locations including the Topkapı Palace, Hagia Sophia, the Bosporus waterway dividing Europe and Asia, the Golden Horn, the Sea of Marmara, and Dolmabahçe Palace, before moving for one week of shooting at the harbor of Kavala, Greece. Interiors were shot at the Billancourt Studios in Paris.

== Reception ==
=== Box office ===
Topkapi grossed $7 million at the US box office, earning $4 million in theatrical rentals in the United States and Canada.

=== Critical response ===
On the review aggregator website Rotten Tomatoes, the film holds an approval rating of 95% based on 21 reviews, with an average rating of 7.8/10.

Bosley Crowther of The New York Times applauded the film as well acted, "adroitly plotted", and abounding in brilliant Technicolor that Dassin exploits "like a child with a new paint box", but he saved his greatest praise for Ustinov:

[I]t is his misadventures and confusions and frights that truly make this picture something more than melodrama with a farcical edge. He makes it a joyous sort of travesty of the bad art of burglary. To see Mr. Ustinov sweating through his mischance encounters with the Turkish police, or playing the role of stool pigeon while running with the gang, or climbing about the roof of the palace under the heavy influence of vertigo, with the Golden Horn in the distance, is to see first-class comedy.

=== Accolades ===
Award	Year	Category	Recipient(s)	Result	Ref.
National Board of Review	1964	Top Ten Films	Topkapi	6th Place	
Academy Awards	1965	Best Supporting Actor	Peter Ustinov	Won	
David di Donatello	1965	Golden Plate	Melina Mercouri	Won	
Golden Globe Awards	1965	Best Actor in a Motion Picture – Musical or Comedy	Peter Ustinov	Nominated	
Golden Globe Awards	1965	Best Actress in a Motion Picture – Musical or Comedy	Melina Mercouri	Nominated	
Laurel Awards	1965	Top Action Drama	Topkapi	4th Place	
Laurel Awards	1965	Supporting Performance, Male	Peter Ustinov	Won	
Writers Guild of America Awards	1965	Best Written American Comedy	Monja Danischewsky	Nominated	

== Legacy ==
Topkapi later inspired the Mission: Impossible television series, and the scene in which a character hangs by a rope in order to steal a dagger inspired a similar scene in the 1996 Mission: Impossible film, where Ethan Hunt (Tom Cruise) rappels into a secure room to access a computer.

In his 2007 autobiography, Peter Sallis, who voiced Wallace, said the 1993 short film The Wrong Trousers was based loosely on Topkapi, and said it was his favorite Wallace & Gromit film.

== See also ==
- List of American films of 1964
