= Send No More Roses =

1977 novel by Eric Ambler

- First edition
- Author: Eric Ambler
- Language: English
- Publisher: Weidenfeld & Nicolson
- Publication date: 1977
- Publication place: United Kingdom
- Media type: Print
- OCLC: 1119913956
- Preceded by: Doctor Frigo
- Followed by: The Care of Time

Send No More Roses is a 1977 novel by Eric Ambler. It was published in the United States as The Siege of the Villa Lipp.

== Plot ==
Paul Firman is a money launderer and extortionist. He offers consultancy advice on tax havens, tax avoidance and tax evasion, then blackmails his clients.

Professor Frits Krom, a pompous sociologist, has identified Firman as Reinhard Oberholzer, one of his previous identities. As Oberholzer, Firman had recruited Kramer, who worked in a Swiss bank, to reveal information about his clients. Firman then blackmailed them. When Kramer was investigated by the Swiss authorities for violating banking secrecy laws, he suffered a fatal heart attack. His wife cooperated with the authorities to trap Firman at Kramer's funeral, where Firman was photographed. Years later at a conference, Krom recognised Firman as Oberholzer.

Krom threatens to expose Firman unless he tells his life story, in which case Krom will allow him anonymity.

Firman consults his business partner Mat Tuakana, alias Williamson. Mat is half Melanesian and hails from Placid Island. Mat intends to help Chief Tebuke of Placid Island achieve independence, and then take control of the country as his own personal tax haven. Mat is anxious to avoid this project being exposed, so agrees that Firman tell his story, leaving out any current information.

Firman's assistant Melanie Wicky-Frey rents the Villa Lipp, on the French Riviera, where the meeting is to take place. Krom brings two witnesses, fellow academics. Also present is Yves Boularis, the technical advisor who bugs the guests' rooms.

Firman recounts his past to Krom and his colleagues. He was from an Argentine-British family, and served in the British Army in the Field Security Police during World War Two. There he met Carlo Lech, a lawyer and black marketeer. They go into business laundering money for American black marketeers. They invest the money for their own purposes, and when a client asks for his money back, they threaten to inform the American authorities. Only a few clients succeed in retrieving their money. Firman and Lech also engage in VAT carousel fraud by transporting goods between EEC countries and claiming multiple tax refunds. They later change business model, blackmailing their clients.

Yves and Melanie discover the villa is under surveillance. Firman realises Mat Tuakana has lured them there to have them all killed. When a boat starts launching rockets at the villa, Firman sets the house on fire to draw the attention of the authorities. He escapes to his private Caribbean island.

== Reception ==
It is regarded as one of Ambler's late masterpieces.

Kirkus Reviews wrote "You can be sure that Eric Ambler would never mix his metaphors, write an ungraceful line, or tell you a story you don't want to hear."
