= The Night-Comers =

1956 novel by Eric Ambler

- First edition
- Author: Eric Ambler
- Language: English
- Publisher: Heinemann
- Publication date: 1956
- Publication place: United Kingdom
- Media type: Print
- OCLC: 752399447
- Preceded by: The Schirmer Inheritance
- Followed by: Passage of Arms

The Night-Comers is a 1956 novel by Eric Ambler. In the United States it was published as State of Siege.

== Plot ==
Steve Fraser is an engineer working on a dam on the Southeast-Asian island of Sunda. Sunda is a former Dutch colony, which has recently become independent. The new republic is dogged by corruption, and threatened by General Sanusi, a devout Moslem, who controls much of the countryside.

The government forces the dam project to employ surplus army officers as "liaison managers", most of whom are unqualified and corrupt. They cause trouble by extorting money from the workers in the form of "union dues", however one, Major Suparto, is hard-working and competent.

Fraser's period of employment at an end, he flies to the capital, Selampang, to catch another plane out. His friend Roy Jebb, a pilot, takes Fraser to the New Harmony Club, where he meets Rosalie, a half Dutch, half Sundan "Indo" girl. At the club, he spots a jeep from the dam project, and overhears Major Suparto talking to a "General". Fraser deduces that because the jeep has been driven over 200 miles in 12 hours, through roadblocks controlled by both Sanusi and the government, Suparto must have friends on both sides.

Roy has to go away for a few days, so he lends Steve his flat on top of the radio station. While Steve and Rosalie are staying there, Sanusi's forces launch their attack. They capture the radio station, and Sanusi broadcasts a statement announcing martial law. Fraser realises his voice is not the voice of the General whom Suparto was talking to in the New Harmony Club two nights previously.

The building is bombed by government forces and generator for the radio transmitter is damaged. Fraser is forced to repair it.

Fraser privately confronts Suparto about being an agent provocateur. Suparto states that the country needs time to learn to govern itself, and that Sanusi has been lured into a trap.

As government forces close in, Sanusi's rebels decide to negotiate. They force Fraser to attend the negotiations as a neutral foreign observer. General Ishak, commander of the government forces, declares that rebel soldiers will be spared but traitorous officers will be killed. Fraser rejects the offer of freedom, and returns to Rosalie. They retreat to the top of the radio building, where Sanusi is killed and Steve and Rosalie are rescued.

== Reception ==
The book was inspired by the 1945–1949 Indonesian National Revolution.

Kirkus Reviews described it as "a sophisticated, circumspect drama of revolution and political terrorism... Not as sinister a chimera of intrigue as his earlier books, but an assured adventure tale to which the shifty, shifting character of this part of the world lends substance."
