= The Schirmer Inheritance =

1953 novel by Eric Ambler

- First edition
- Author: Eric Ambler
- Language: English
- Publisher: Heinemann
- Publication date: 1953
- Publication place: United Kingdom
- Media type: Print
- OCLC: 001026701
- Preceded by: Judgment on Deltchev
- Followed by: The Night-Comers

The Schirmer Inheritance is a 1953 novel by Eric Ambler. It was adapted for television in 1957 by ITV.

== Plot ==
Franz Schirmer was a soldier from Ansbach who had deserted after the 1807 Battle of Preussisch-Eylau. He changed his name to Schneider to avoid being prosecuted, but did not change the name of his eldest son Karl. Franz's 19th-century descendants emigrated to the United States and accumulated a great fortune.

George Carey is a former WWII bomber pilot and recently qualified lawyer. In 1951 or 1952, Carey is tasked with going through the Schneider Johnson files, regarding the inheritance of Amelia Schneider Johnson, a rich Pennsylvanian woman who died in 1938 without a will, and without known living blood relatives. The state therefore claims the inheritance. Carey has to check that nothing has been overlooked in the search for the heir to the Schneider fortune.

An extensive search for more indirect Schirmer/Schneider relatives finally leads to Franz Schirmer, a German WWII soldier who took part in the Axis Occupation of Greece and who — when the defeat of Nazi Germany was clearly imminent — defected from the Wehrmacht and joined the Greek communist guerrillas. As such he took an active part in the Greek Civil War and after the communist defeat became a leader of bank-robbers holed up in the mountains.

Franz Schirmer is fascinated by the parallels between his life and that of his great-great-grandfather, also called Franz. George Carey's translator, Miss Kolin, hates Germans and betrays Schirmer to the Greek police. However, they are across the Yugoslav border and out of reach of the Greek authorities.

Carey researches whether, if Schirmer went to America to claim his fortune, the Greek authorities would be able to extradite him back to Greece for his crimes. However Schirmer does not intend to try. He seduces Miss Kolin, and they disappear in the night, taking copies of the Schirmer files, perhaps to try to claim the fortune under another name.

== Reception ==
A review in the New York Times stated "What The Schirmer Inheritance lacks in suspense... it makes up for in expertise and verisimilitude... It is one of Mr Ambler's merits that he finely adjusts his characters to his medium, giving them reality enough, but never that mite too much which would destroy the airy fabric of the illusion."
