= Epitaph for a Spy =

1938 novel by Eric Ambler

- First edition
- Author: Eric Ambler
- Language: English
- Publisher: Hodder & Stoughton
- Publication date: 1938
- Publication place: United Kingdom
- Media type: Print
- OCLC: 758608170
- Preceded by: Uncommon Danger
- Followed by: Cause for Alarm

Epitaph for a Spy is a 1938 spy novel by Eric Ambler.

== Plot ==
Josef Vadassy is a Hungarian refugee who is effectively stateless. He was born in Szabadka, then in Hungary, but it became Subotica and part of Yugoslavia following the 1920 Treaty of Trianon. His Yugoslav passport later expired and the authorities refused to renew it.

While on holiday in the south of France, he sends a roll of camera film for development; however, it turns out to contain pictures which are not his, but of nearby naval defences. He is arrested on suspicion of spying. The police realise that Vadassy did not take the pictures, but that someone else at his hotel must have an identical camera, a Zeiss Ikon Contax. Vadassy is told to return to the hotel to find the real spy, with the threat that should he fail to do so, he will be deported, which could mean death.

Back at the hotel, Vadassy finds himself cast in the role of amateur detective and under constant surveillance by the authorities, especially the naval intelligence agent Beghin, who monitors his movements and pressures him to cooperate. He is uneasy, suspicious, isolated: he must mingle with the other guests, listen to their stories, watch for inconsistencies, and try to identify who among them possessed the same model of camera and could have taken the incriminating photographs.

The hotel, which had seemed quaint, now feels oppressive. Vadassy learns small details: one guest declines photography, another is secretive about his origin, a couple exchange mysterious letters, someone's story seems to shift. He is hampered by his natural diffidence, his fear of making the wrong accusation, and the constant shadow cast by the threat of deportation. At night, his room is broken into, he is struck over the head, and his papers are rifled; yet no proof emerges.

As the deadline imposed by Beghin approaches, Vadassy becomes more desperate. He realises that the spy's identity may hinge on a subtle clue — not an act of violence, but a slip of speech, a turn of phrase, a hidden motive tied to the increasingly fraught political climate in Europe. He confronts one suspect, only to receive an alibi; he fears accusing another only to find that the evidence is circumstantial. All along, Vadassy is wracked with guilt, thinking that his own ignorance and hesitation may doom him.

Finally, in a tense denouement, the real spy is revealed: not the most flamboyant suspect, but the one whose background had been least noticed. Vadassy, though terrified, forces the confrontation: Beghin arrives, but the spy attempts to escape. In the chase that follows, Vadassy — even though an amateur — plays a critical role in cornering the culprit.

Even once the spy is caught, Vadassy's situation remains precarious: Beghin quietly acknowledges that Vadassy has served his purpose, but offers no public vindication. Vadassy departs, uncertain whether he is safe. He reflects bitterly that even knowing the truth may no longer matter in a world sliding toward chaos. He returns to Paris, his position fragile, aware that stateless men have no security, and that the borders of Europe are closing in.

== Context ==
The novel was published and is set just before World War II. Vadassy is a typical Ambler protagonist, sympathetic but out of his depth. The plight of stateless individuals is a recurring theme in Ambler's novels. The hotel setting makes the novel similar to a country house whodunit.

The book contained early descriptions of German concentration camps, based on Ambler's conversations with refugees and reading of left-wing newspapers.

The book was serialised in the Daily Express and made Ambler a household name.

== Adaptations ==
The novel was filmed as Hotel Reserve in 1944, starring James Mason. It was adapted for television in 1953, with Peter Cushing as Josef Vadassy, and again in 1963 with Colin Jeavons as Vadassy.
