= Judgment on Deltchev =

1951 novel by Eric Ambler

- First edition (UK)
- Author: Eric Ambler
- Language: English
- Publisher: Hodder & Stoughton (UK); Alfred A. Knopf (US)
- Publication date: 1951
- Publication place: United Kingdom
- Media type: Print
- OCLC: 978598449
- Preceded by: Journey into Fear
- Followed by: The Schirmer Inheritance

Judgment on Deltchev is a 1951 novel by Eric Ambler. The book is a courtroom drama based on the show trial of Bulgarian politician Nikola Petkov. It provoked hostile responses from Communist fellow travellers.

It was Ambler's first solo novel for eleven years (not counting a novel written with Charles Rodda under the pseudonym Eliot Reed), and he was worried about producing a bad novel, but did not.

It is regarded as one of Ambler's finest books. James Fenton called the book "Ambler's best novel... the most interesting politically and the most profound".

== Plot ==
Foster is an English playwright who is hired by an American newspaper to visit an unnamed East European country, to report on the show trial of politician Yordan Deltchev. Deltchev was a member of the Agrarian Socialist Party, however the People's Party had taken power in a coup d'etat. After Deltchev spoke out, he was arrested and the Agrarian Socialist Party was suppressed.

Deltchev had gone to great lengths to secure the Anglo-American, rather than Soviet, occupation of the country after the end of the Second World War. He is accused of doing so for personal gain. In addition, he is accused of being part of a plot by the Officer Corps Brotherhood secret society to assassinate the country's leader, Vukashin.

Foster is met by Georghi Pashik, his employer's local representative, who runs a press bureau. Pashik is keen that Foster not cause trouble.

The regime has denied Deltchev insulin to treat his diabetes; a fact which Deltchev uses in court to discredit the prosecution's inferences. However, it becomes apparent that the evidence of Deltchev's membership of the Officer Corps Brotherhood is real.

Foster visits Deltchev's wife, Madame Deltchev. Deltchev's daughter Katerina asks Foster to deliver a letter. When he does so, he finds a murdered body. Pashik arrives, claiming to have followed Foster. Pashik takes Foster to visit Aleko, who claims he is a member of the secret police.

Foster survives an assassination attempt. Katerina reveals it is Deltchev's son Philip who is a member of the Officer Corps Brotherhood, as is Pashik.

Sibley, an American who is secretly working for propaganda minister Brankovitch, reveals that Pashik worked as an interpreter for the Americans, and is passionately pro-American. Pashik had become a spy to help the government eliminate the Officer Corps Brotherhood. His press agency is majority-owned by Madame Deltchev, who managed Yordan Deltchev's career. Aleko is really working for the People's Party, who have taken over the Officer Corps Brotherhood as a false-flag operation. Brankovitch intends to have his rival Vukashin assassinated, and blame it on the Brotherhood and the Agrarian People's Party.

At a military parade the following day, it is Brankovitch who is assassinated. Aleko is really working for Vukashin, who knew about Brankovitch's machinations. Pashik, Aleko, and Deltchev are executed.
