= The Schirmer Inheritance (TV series) =

- Based on: The Schirmer Inheritance by Eric Ambler
- Written by: Kenneth Hyde
- Directed by: Philip Dale
- Starring: William Sylvester; Vera Fusek; Jefferson Clifford; Alan Tilvern
- Country of origin: United Kingdom
- Original language: English
- No. of series: 1
- No. of episodes: 6

Production
- Producer: Stuart Latham
- Running time: 30m per episode
- Production company: ABC Weekend TV

Original release
- Release: 3 August – 7 September 1957

The Schirmer Inheritance is a 1957 ABC Weekend TV television series. It is based on the novel by Eric Ambler.

== Cast ==
- William Sylvester as George Carey
- Vera Fusek as Kolin
- Jefferson Clifford as Robert L. Moreton
- Alan Tilvern as Arthur
- Irene Handl as Frau Gresser
- Manning Wilson as Mr. Lange
- Paul Stassino as Captain Streftaris
- Steve Plytas as Truck driver
- Colin Croft as Hacker
- John G. Heller as Barman
- Errol John as Charlie
- Richard Shaw as Sergeant Franz Schirmer
- Gerard Heinz as Father Weichs
- Andreas Malandrinos as Cafe proprietor
- Elwyn Brook-Jones as Colonel Chrysantos
- David Cargill as Doctor
