= The Levanter =

Novel by Eric Ambler

- First edition
- Author: Eric Ambler
- Language: English
- Publisher: Weidenfeld & Nicolson
- Publication date: 1972
- Publication place: United Kingdom
- Media type: Print
- OCLC: 978687119
- Preceded by: The Intercom Conspiracy
- Followed by: Doctor Frigo

The Levanter is a 1972 novel by Eric Ambler.

== Plot ==
Michael Howell is a "levantine mongrel" who has inherited his family's Middle-Eastern business. He is forced by the Palestine Action Force to produce bombs for them.

The story is framed by a description from a journalist of Ghaled, a Palestinian terrorist and extortionist.

Howell's company has its Syrian assets frozen by the new socialist government. Hoping to make the best of a bad situation, he proposes to the government that they start various joint ventures, with Howell's foreign companies getting exclusive export rights. One of these joint ventures is a battery company. Howell's mistress/colleague Teresa discovers the battery business has been ordering unnecessary and unauthorized extra materials. Michael recognizes these materials as ingredients for bombs, and they visit the factory at night. There, they discover an employee is hosting bomb-making classes. The security guard turns out to be Ghaled, the notorious terrorist, who threatens Howell and his mistress, and forces them to join the Palestinian Action Force (PAF). He forces them to sign confessions of being Israeli spies, and to assist with ordering crucial parts for bomb detonators.

Ghaled has two plans. The first is to build hundreds of suitcase bombs and distribute them throughout Israel on tourist buses. These are all to be detonated simultaneously using radio receiver parts from one of Howell's companies. The second is to fire rockets at the Tel Aviv coastline from a small wooden boat the PAF has bought, shielding it from radar with one of Howell's larger ships. Ghaled and Howell travel on Howell's ship. Howell has secretly given orders to the captain to remain sufficiently far from the coast that the rockets are out of range. In a struggle between the ship's crew and Ghaled's men, Howell shoots Ghaled dead, and destroys the remote control for the suitcase bombs.

It turns out the Israeli authorities have already destroyed the suitcase bombs, by reverse-engineering the detonation signal using a detonator Howell supplied them, and broadcasting it before the bombs could be distributed.

== Reception ==
Kirkus Reviews described the main character as "the most attractive antihero who's been around in some time." Alan Furst wrote that it "features some of the strongest action scenes to be found in Ambler".

The book won the Gold Dagger award.
