= Journey into Fear (1975 film) =

1975 film by Daniel Mann

Journey Into Fear
- Theatrical release poster
- Directed by: Daniel Mann
- Screenplay by: Trevor Wallace
- Based on: Journey into Fear; 1940 novel by Eric Ambler
- Produced by: Trevor Wallace; L. John Creery
- Starring: Sam Waterston; Zero Mostel; Yvette Mimieux; Vincent Price
- Cinematography: Harry Waxman
- Edited by: John McSweeney Jr.
- Music by: Alex North
- Production company: New World Productions
- Distributed by: International Film Distributors (Canada)
- Release date: 8 August 1975 (United States)
- Running time: 100 minutes
- Country: Canada
- Language: English

Journey into Fear is a 1975 Canadian thriller film directed by Daniel Mann, and based on the 1940 novel of the same name by Eric Ambler.

It stars Sam Waterston, Zero Mostel, Yvette Mimieux, Vincent Price, Donald Pleasence, Shelley Winters, Stanley Holloway, Joseph Wiseman and Ian McShane.

The film is a remake of the novel of the same name made in 1943, Journey into Fear, starring Orson Welles.

== Plot ==
U.S. geologist Graham (Sam Waterston) discovers a rich oil deposit in the mountains of Turkey that creates a dangerous conflict between Turks and Arabs interests.

His life suddenly in peril, Graham tries to escape aboard a boat with the assistance of a Mr. Kupelkin of the Turkish embassy. The passengers he encounters include a singer, Josette, who may also be a prostitute; and a bickering couple, Mr. and Mrs. Mathews. All the while, Graham becomes aware that someone on board is determined to kill him.

== Cast ==
- Sam Waterston as Graham
- Zero Mostel as Kupelkin
- Yvette Mimieux as Josette
- Scott Marlowe as Jose
- Ian McShane as Banat
- Vincent Price as Dervos
- Donald Pleasence as Kuvelti
- Shelley Winters as Mrs. Mathews
- Stanley Holloway as Mr. Mathews
- Jackie Cooper as Hurst
- Joseph Wiseman as Col. Haki

== Critical reception ==
TV Guide wrote, "this version was shot all over Europe with well-known guest artists who ought to have known better, and directed by Mann who has done much better."

== Production ==
Majority of filming and setting took place onboard the 1950 built vessel Spalmatori Seaman IMO number 5211707. Filming and setting also took place in Vancouver.

== Influence ==
"Journey into Fear: Pilot's Quarters 1 and 2" (2001), an art installation by Stan Douglas "was inspired by the 1975 Daniel Mann film Journey into Fear," writes Rachel Taylor, Assistant Curator, Tate Modern, on the Tate website:

"one of the first major films to be shot on location in Vancouver. Mann’s film a remake of the 1942 film of the same name directed by Norman Foster, which was based on the 1940 novel by Eric Ambler. Douglas’ video, like the two Hollywood films, is set on a container ship. Two characters based on Graham and Möller discuss and argue; Möller tries to convince Graham to delay a container en route to Vancouver, an act that would destabilize shares in a particular Asian contractor, leaving the company's shares vulnerable to an aggressive takeover. These scenes, which form the majority of the video, take place in the ship's pilots quarters. The diptych presents views of the sets used for filming these scenes. Both photographs show the sets from a distance, exposing the sound stage in which they are situated. The sets are empty of people but lights and microphones are visible. Both images show the cabin with a ‘fourth wall’ removed to allow filming take place. In Pilot's Quarters 2 the cabin is seen from behind the pilot's bed, while in Pilot's Quarters 1 the bed is seen on the left side of the room. Douglas’ practice has always included photography as a source and inspiration for his filmmaking as well as an art form in itself. The large scale images of the set serve to highlight the artifice of filmmaking, laying bare the techniques involved in film-making."
