= Win Min Than =

Burmese actress

- ဝင်းမင်းသန်း
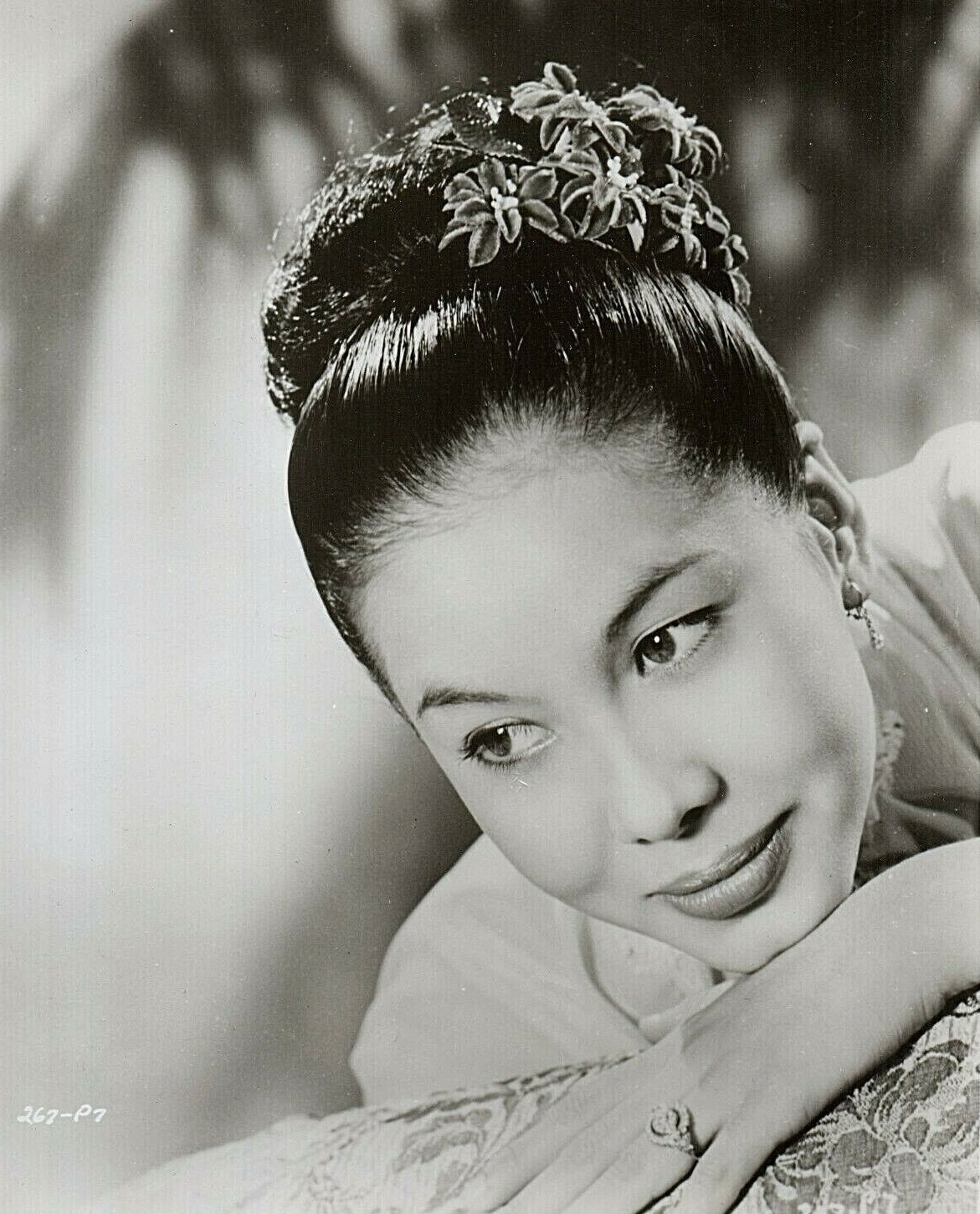
- Than in The Purple Plain (1954)
- Born: Helga Johnston; 30 November 1933 (age 92); Bago, Burma
- Occupation: Actress
- Years active: 1954–1957
- Spouse: Bo Setkya
- Children: Aka Setkya

Win Min Than (Burmese: ဝင်းမင်းသန်း; born 30 November 1933) is a Burmese actress. She is best known for her role in the 1954 British film The Purple Plain.

== Biography ==
Than was born on 30 November 1933 in Bago, Burma, under British rule, and grew up in Rangoon. Her father was Anglo-Burmese and her mother Germanic-Burmese. Her father was a government officer. When the Japanese occupied Burma during World War II, the family fled to India. Until she was 14 years old, she attended a convent school, where she learned English.

In 1951, her family sent her to London, where she attended Marie Rambert's dance school, but she quickly realised that she was not a dancer and returned to Burma.

In 1954, a friend of American director Robert Parrish visited her home and took a photograph of her, which he sent to Parrish. She was selected out of some 200 women for the role of Anna in the film The Purple Plain. She had never acted in a film before and reportedly suffered from severe facial convulsions on set and bulging eyes before kissing scenes. Variety praised her romantic scenes with Peck, writing: "Subsequently there are some very tender scenes played in a neighbouring village community in which Peck begins a new romantic entanglement with Win Min Than, an exotic yet restrained Burmese beauty."

On 7 January 1954 in Rome, she married the Burmese politician Bo Setkya (Thakin Aung Than). They had one son, Aka Setkya. Her husband died on 6 September 1969, following a heart attack. She resides in Australia with her son.

== Filmography ==
=== Films ===
- The Purple Plain (1954)
