= The Light of Day (Eric Ambler novel) =

1962 novel by Eric Ambler

- Author: Eric Ambler
- Language: English
- Publisher: Heinemann
- Publication date: 1962
- Publication place: United Kingdom
- Media type: Print
- OCLC: 926820526
- Preceded by: Passage of Arms
- Followed by: A Kind of Anger

The Light of Day is a 1962 novel by Eric Ambler.

== Plot ==
Arthur Abdel Simpson, the narrator, was born in Egypt to an Egyptian mother and a British soldier father. After the premature death of his father he was sent to a British boarding school, a formative experience to which he refers throughout the story. Simpson identifies as British, although his career as a petty criminal has gotten him barred from both Egypt and the United Kingdom.

At the opening of the story Simpson lives in Athens, acting as a guide and taxi-driver so he can steal from tourists. One of his targets, a man named Harper, catches him, and blackmails him into driving a car across the border from Greece into Turkey. The Turkish authorities find that the car is loaded with concealed illegal weapons, and Simpson faces the terrifying prospect of a long term in a Turkish prison. However, the authorities offer him a chance to earn leniency: he must deliver the weapons according to Harper's instructions, and then somehow ingratiate himself with Harper's gang, learn their goals and plans, and report regularly to the government's agents. The government suspects an attempt at terrorism or insurgency against the National Unity Committee, but it turns out that Harper and his gang actually have an audacious plan to steal valuable gems from the treasury museum of the Topkapı Palace. While preparing for the robbery, one of the gang suffers a disabling injury, and Simpson is forced to take his place and participate in a commando-type raid on the museum, despite having no relevant experience whatsoever.

After the successful raid, the gang realise they are being followed, and drive to the airport. Simpson steals their car containing the gems, and escapes. He returns the gems to the police, who are not especially grateful given that, due to Simpson's incompetence, the gang escaped the country by air.

== Reception ==
Kirkus Reviews described it as "an impeccable international intrigue... this is a suave, scapegrace and often very funny entertainment." A review on Reaction.life described it as "a psychological sketch of brutal acuity, wrapped in a comic masterpiece."

It was nominated for the 1962 Gold Dagger award. It won the Mystery Writers of America's Edgar Allan Poe Award for best novel in 1964.

It was filmed in 1964 as Topkapi. This was the most successful adaptation of one of Ambler's books.
