= Journey into Fear (1943 film) =

1943 film by Norman Foster

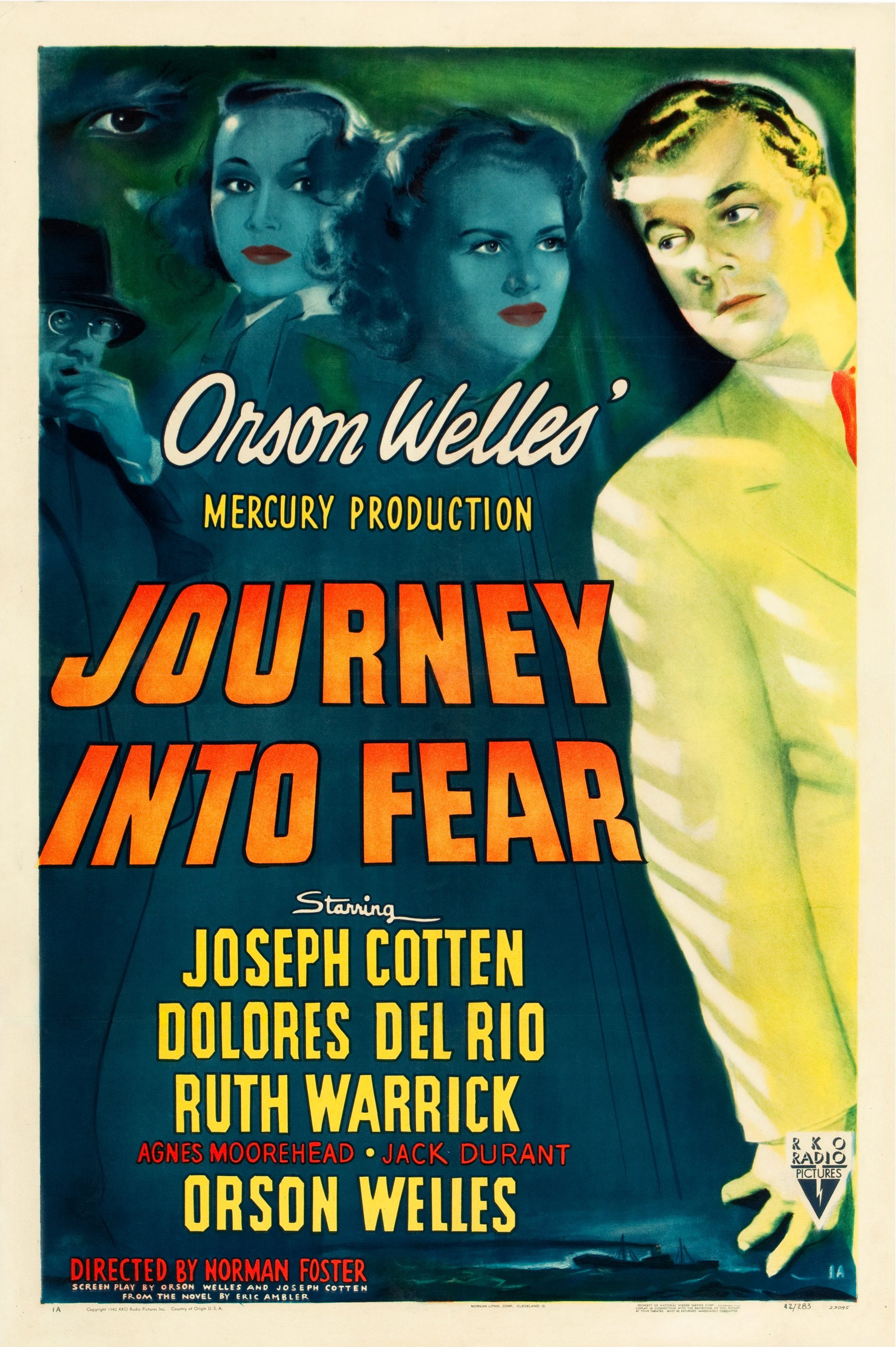
- Theatrical release poster by William Rose
- Directed by: Norman Foster; Orson Welles (Note: uncredited director of additional scenes)
- Screenplay by: Joseph Cotten; Orson Welles (Note: uncredited in some versions)
- Based on: Journey into Fear by Eric Ambler
- Produced by: Orson Welles (Note: uncredited)
- Starring: Joseph Cotten; Dolores del Río; Ruth Warrick; Agnes Moorehead; Jack Durant; Orson Welles
- Cinematography: Karl Struss
- Edited by: Mark Robson
- Music by: Roy Webb
- Production company: Mercury Productions
- Distributed by: RKO Pictures
- Release date: February 12, 1943 (U.S.)
- Running time: 68 minutes
- Country: United States
- Language: English

Journey into Fear is a 1943 American spy film noir directed by Norman Foster, based on the 1940 British novel of the same name by Eric Ambler. The film adaptation broadly follows the plot of the book, but the protagonist was changed to an American engineer. The destination of his journey was changed from France to the Soviet Union—reflecting the changes in the war situation since the original Ambler book was written. (France was occupied by German troops, and the US and Soviet Union had joined the war and become allies). The RKO Pictures release stars Joseph Cotten, who co-wrote the screenplay with Orson Welles. The Mercury Production was also produced by Welles, again uncredited.

In 2005, an alternate cut was shown at a Welles film retrospective at the Locarno International Film Festival in Switzerland. It was the original European release print, lacking the narration and ending of the US version but including about six minutes of footage deleted by RKO Pictures.

== Plot ==
In an opening scene before the credits, the assassin Banat is seen preparing a gun while a gramophone sticks as it plays. The story that follows is the narrative of a letter from Howard Graham, an American armaments engineer, to his wife Stephanie. While journeying to the Soviet port of Batumi to return to the United States to complete his business with the Turkish Navy, Graham and his wife stop in Istanbul and are met by Kopeikin, a Turkish employee of Graham's company. Under the pretense of discussing business, he takes Graham to a nightclub to introduce him to the dancer Josette Maretl and her partner Gogo. Banat tries unsuccessfully to kill Graham during a magic act but shoots the magician instead. Graham is brought to the headquarters of the Turkish secret police for questioning, where Colonel Haki blames the assassination attempt on German agents seeking to delay the rearming of Turkish ships.

The colonel shows Graham a photograph of Banat, who he says was hired by a Nazi agent named Muller. Haki then orders Graham to travel secretly to Batumi aboard a tramp steamer, and Haki personally oversees the safe overland transit of Stephanie.

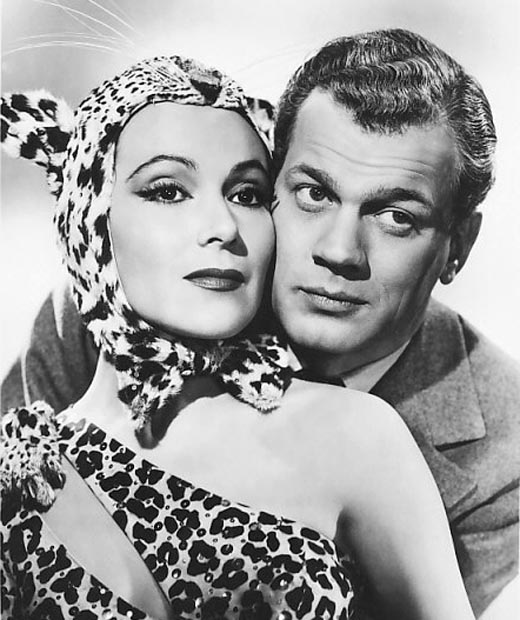
Joseph Cotten and Dolores del Río in a promotional photo of the film (1943)

Graham's fellow passengers include Josette and Gogo; Kuvetli, an ingratiating Turkish tobacco salesman; Professor Haller, an apolitical German archeologist; and the henpecked Matthews and his French wife. Josette sees that Graham is frightened. Not knowing that he is married, she tries to become close to him. At an interim port call, Graham is made aware of the arrival of a new passenger by the annoying clamor of a gramophone. Haller warns him that Kuvetli is not who he claims to be. At dinner, Graham recognizes Banat and tries to persuade the ship's captain and purser to put him ashore, but they believe that he is crazy. Graham turns to Josette for help. She has Gogo engage Banat in a poker game while Graham unsuccessfully searches Banat's cabin for the assassin's gun.

When Graham returns to his own cabin, he is met by an armed Haller. Graham deduces that he is actually Muller, who offers to spare Graham's life by delaying his return to the US for six weeks by having him taken to a hospital with a case of "typhus." Muller warns Graham that Kuvetli is a Turkish agent sent by Haki and that the American will be killed if he confides the plan to the Turk.

Kuvetli was eavesdropping from the next cabin, however, and later tells Graham that Muller's "plan" is just a scheme to get him away from the ship before him. Kuvetli instructs Graham to pretend to agree to the plan but, before the ship docks in Batumi, to hide himself in an empty cabin while the Turkish agent arranges for the arrest of the German agents.

When Graham goes to the empty cabin, he finds Kuvetli dead on the floor, murdered by Banat. Graham asks Mathews to deliver a message to the Turkish consul in Batumi to notify Haki. Matthews gives the unarmed Graham a pocketknife. Graham runs into Gogo, who bluntly offers to "give up" Josette for Graham to marry for a cash consideration.

Muller and Banat coerce Graham into a waiting car. When the car has a flat tire, Graham jams Matthews' pocketknife into the horn and, in the ensuing commotion, jumps into the driver's seat, crashes the car into a shop window, and escapes. That night, as a storm rages, Graham joins his wife at their hotel, but Muller arrives there first by impersonating a coworker from Graham's company.

Banat intimidates Graham from leaving and Muller persuades Stephanie to join Haki downstairs while he "talks business" with Graham. He leaves Graham to be killed by Banat, but Gogo enters the room to promote his deal for Josette, and Banat shoots at him.

Graham flees via a window onto the cornice of the building in the torrential rain, pursued by Banat and Muller. Trapped between them, he is saved when Haki appears and shoots Muller. Banat wounds Haki but, blinded by the rain, misses Graham. The two struggle, and Banat falls to his death.

Back in the present, Haki tells Graham as he finishes the letter that Stephanie is waiting for him. He wonders aloud why the engineer took decisive action when he had been so indecisive earlier. Graham tears up the now-completed letter and responds, "I got mad. Spent too much time running away."

== Cast ==
The cast of Journey Into Fear is listed at the AFI Catalog of Feature Films. Several cast members were Mercury Productions staff, including Herb Drake (publicist), Shifra Haran (secretary), Eddie Howard (chauffeur), Robert Meltzer (writer), Bill Roberts (publicist), and Jack Moss (business manager).

- Joseph Cotten as Howard Graham
- Dolores del Río as Josette Martel
- Ruth Warrick as Stephanie Graham
- Agnes Moorehead as Mrs. Mathews
- Jack Durant as Gogo
- Everett Sloane as Kopeikin
- Eustace Wyatt as Professor Haller/Muller
- Frank Readick as Matthews
- Edgar Barrier as Kuvetli
- Jack Moss as Banat
- Stefan Schnabel as Purser
- Hans Conried as Oo Lang Sang, the magician
- Robert Meltzer as Steward
- Richard Bennett as Ship's Captain
- Orson Welles as Colonel Haki

== Production ==
=== Development ===
RKO bought the film rights to the novel in 1941 intending to use it as a vehicle for Michèle Morgan, with Alfred Hitchcock initially attached to direct. Morgan's intended American debut Joan of Paris was postponed; Ben Hecht was signed to write the script, Robert Stevenson was to direct and David Hempstead to produce. Fred Astaire was discussed as the male lead. Dennis O'Keefe was also discussed.

Eventually Joseph Cotten was assigned the lead on the basis of his performance in Citizen Kane.

In July, Stevenson was assigned to another movie, resulting in Morgan doing Joan of Paris after all.

In July 1941 it was announced that Orson Welles would play a lead role and direct the film. He would do this following completion of his second movie, The Magnificent Ambersons, and aimed to do it before commencing on It's All True.

Welles disregarded Hecht's script and wrote a new one with Joseph Cotten. He also brought in Jack Moss from Paramount as producer.

Welles's involvement saw the addition to the cast of other people from his stock company, such as Ruth Warrick, Agnes Moorehead and Everett Sloane. Morgan was no longer associated with the film, being replaced by Dolores del Río.

Welles's work on Ambersons would mean that ultimately, he was unable to direct the movie. He gave the job to Norman Foster, who had impressed Welles with his screenwriting work on It's All True.

=== Shooting ===
Journey into Fear was in production from January 6, 1942 to March 12, 1942, with editing lasting till May. The director was Norman Foster. Peter Bogdanovich later asked Welles if he had anything to do with directing the scene on the building ledge. "Well, we all did—whoever was nearest the camera, there was no other way to get it made, because of the difficulties," Welles said. "It was a terrible situation." The cast and crew had all been working for 24 hours to complete Welles's scenes before he departed for Brazil, to film It's All True. "It was a collaborative effort," Welles said.

Welles did produce and design the picture and wrote the script with Joseph Cotten. Welles's main contribution as producer was the opening sequence in which the assassin listens to an old gramophone record while loading his gun. Welles said that at the time he thought he was the first to come up with a scene before the titles begin. He later learned that Lewis Milestone had done it in Of Mice and Men, a 1939 film Welles hadn't seen.

Modern filmographies acknowledge Welles's contributions as director, producer and screenwriter.

== Release ==
During the film's post-production, Welles was fired by RKO and his Mercury unit told to leave the studio. The film was edited without Welles's involvement.

According to Mark Robson, "They made an incomplete film; that is to say, the film was finished but it had no finish. It had wonderful things in it, but it also had much that was very silly." Robson says he "was on very good terms with [Welles] and asked him if I could try to put Journey into Fear back into some continuity that would please him. He agreed and I did. He was quite pleased with the results and only then consented to come in and make a finish to the picture."

=== Box office ===
According to RKO records, the film incurred a loss of $193,000.

=== Home media ===
Turner Home Entertainment released the film on laserdisc in 1989 and on VHS (Cat. No. 2049) in 1991. It has been released on DVD in Italy. In 2024, Warner Archive released a 68-minute version of Journey Into Fear on Blu-ray in the United States and Canada.

=== Remake ===
A remake was released in 1975.

== Film memorabilia ==
In an auction April 26, 2014, a script of Journey into Fear was sold for $7,500 and a collection of approximately 180 stills and production photos sold for $2,375. The materials were among those found in boxes and trunks of Welles's personal possessions by his daughter Beatrice Welles.
