= The Mask of Dimitrios (novel) =

Book by Eric Ambler

- Author: Eric Ambler
- Language: English
- Genre: Adventure novel, Spy novel
- Publication date: 1939
- Publication place: United Kingdom
- Media type: Print (hardback & paperback)
- OCLC: 854980711
- Preceded by: Cause for Alarm
- Followed by: Journey into Fear

The Mask of Dimitrios is a 1939 novel by Eric Ambler. In the United States it was published as A Coffin for Dimitrios.

The book is sometimes regarded as Ambler's finest, however this is disputed.

Ambler's discussions with Turkish exiles in Montparnasse provided some of the inspiration for the book.

The character Charles Latimer also features in The Intercom Conspiracy.

== Plot ==
Mystery writer Charles Latimer meets Colonel Haki of the Turkish police. Haki believes Latimer would be interested in the career of the notorious criminal Dimitrios Makropoulos, whose body has been identified in an Istanbul morgue. Latimer, who is indeed intrigued, begins an independent investigation of Dimitrios' criminal career.

Latimer visits Smyrna, where Dimitrios had killed a Jewish moneylender in such a way that the blame would fall on someone else, then used the money to escape the Great Fire of Smyrna. Dimitrios was soon after involved in the assassination of Stambulisky, and later in heroin smuggling.

Latimer follows the trail to Piraeus, where he learns someone else has already been making enquiries about Dimitrios, and then by train to Sofia. On the train he meets a Mr Peters. In Sofia, Latimer learns that Stambulisky's assassination was funded by the Eurasian Credit Trust, a bank which would have otherwise suffered losses causes by a rising lev. Latimer's contact in Sofia sends him to Irana Preveza, an associate of Dimitrios who now runs a brothel. Dimitrios had been her pimp, and had also used her to receive letters on his behalf.

On returning to his hotel, Latimer finds his room has been ransacked by Mr Peters, who threatens him with a Luger pistol. Peters demands to know why Latimer is interested in Dimitrios. Peters states he was not the man making enquiries about Dimitrios in Piraeus, and Latimer tells him Dimitrios is dead. Peters declares they should form an alliance, which will make Latimer half a million francs. He sends Latimer to a Mr Grodek in Geneva.

Grodek was a spy for Italy, who used Dimitrios to steal plans from the Yugoslav Navy, however Dimitrios betrayed him.

Latimer meets Peters in Paris, in a house which Dimitrios had bought in Peters' name. Peters explains Dimitrios had been involved in trafficking women, had recruited Peters to his heroin smuggling gang, and finally betrayed Peters to the police. The capital for purchasing the heroin was supplied by the Eurasian Credit Trust, of which Dimitrios later became a Director. After Peters got out of prison, he sold the house to himself under a different name, in case Dimitrios should return. Peters shows Latimer a photograph, which he recognises as Dimitrios from the Istanbul morgue, however Peters reveals the photo is of a different member of the gang, Visser, and Dimitrios is alive and well.

Visser had traced Dimitrios and was blackmailing him, so Dimitrios killed him. Mr Peters proposes he and Latimer blackmail Dimitrios, using their combined information of Latimer's ability to correctly identify the body, and Peters' knowledge of Dimitrios's new identity. They finally meet Dimitrios in a hotel room, and give him instructions to deliver a million francs. When they return to Peters' house with the money, Dimitrios is waiting for them. He shoots Peters, and Latimer and Dimitrios fight. Latimer obtains Dimitrios's pistol, and hands Peters' his pistol, then leaves to fetch the police. After Latimer leaves, he hears four shots. He returns to the room to find Peters and Dimitrios dead. He cleans away his fingerprints and leaves.

== Reception and adaptations ==
The book has received positive reviews. The Wall Street Journal called it "a startling, elegant masterpiece of espionage fiction." The Pequod described it as "a first-rate book, with lucid prose, complex characters, and a well-structured plot," and rated the book a 9.5 out of 10. On the crime fiction website Crime Reads, the editor and columnist Neil Nyren said, "I’ve worked with many writers of international suspense, and whenever I’ve wanted to recommend a book to any of them that captures the genre as well as any book possibly can—this is the one I send them to."

The book was adapted into a film in 1944, The Mask of Dimitrios, starring Peter Lorre and Sydney Greenstreet.

It was dramatised for BBC Radio by Stephen Sheridan in 2013, in two 1-hour episodes.

In the 1957 novel From Russia, with Love, James Bond reads The Mask of Dimitrios while on a flight to Istanbul.
