= Journey into Fear (novel) =

1940 novel by Eric Ambler

- First edition cover
- Author: Eric Ambler
- Language: English
- Publisher: Hodder & Stoughton
- Publication date: 1940
- Publication place: United Kingdom
- Media type: Print
- OCLC: 856283727
- Preceded by: The Mask of Dimitrios
- Followed by: Judgment on Deltchev

Journey into Fear is a 1940 spy thriller novel by Eric Ambler. Film adaptations were released in 1943 and 1975.

== Plot summary ==
The novel is set at the beginning of the Second World War. Graham is a British armaments engineer, due to travel back from Turkey, where he has completed technical preparations for a project to improve the Turkish navy. His company's representative in Turkey, Kopeikin, takes him to an Istanbul nightclub, where he meets Josette, a Hungarian dancer. He sees a man in a crumpled suit, watching him.

Returning to his hotel room, Graham is shot at, but only his hand is grazed. Graham doesn't see the shooter's face. A doctor dresses Graham's hand, and Kopeikin takes him to see Colonel Haki, the head of the secret police. Haki features in The Mask of Dimitrios and returns in later Ambler stories as a general.

Haki informs Graham that German spies seek to assassinate him, because of the secrets in Graham's head which he hasn't put to paper. A weaker Turkish navy would help Germany's position in the war. Haki has already prevented an earlier attempt on Graham's life. Graham identifies the man in the crumpled suit from a photograph, and Haki reveals this is Banat, a Romanian hired killer. Haki insists that Graham travel home by a ship, on which he has vetted all the passengers.

Kopeikin gives Graham a revolver. On board the ship, Graham is surprised to meet Josette, and her Spanish partner/pimp José. Also on board is an elderly German archaeologist Haller and his wife; a Turkish tobacco dealer Kuvetli; a French couple the Mathises; and an Italian lady with her son.

The ship docks in Athens and Graham goes ashore for sightseeing. When he returns, he is horrified to find the ship has taken aboard another passenger, who he recognises as Banat. Banat is pretending to be a Greek. The ship's purser refuses to put Graham ashore, thinking him mad. Returning to his cabin, he finds his revolver has been stolen.

Graham searches Banat's room for his weapon, but doesn't find it. Haller reveals himself to be Moeller, a German spymaster. He proposes to spare Graham's life if Graham agrees to be held under armed guard for six weeks. Kuvetli reveals himself to be a Turkish agent. Kuvetli intends to leave the ship by pilot boat before the ship docks, to arrange for Graham to be escorted off the boat away from the German killers. However, Graham later finds Kuvetli murdered. Graham finds out that Mathis has a revolver, which he borrows.

When the ship docks, Graham is escorted by Moeller and Banat to their car. They drive along a country road and reveal their intention to murder Graham there. Graham uses Mathis' revolver to shoot Banat dead, then jumps out of the car and shoots its fuel tank, causing an explosion which kills its remaining occupants.

The Turkish consul puts Graham on a train across the border. He is reunited with Josette, José, and the Mathises. He returns the revolver to Mathis.

== Analysis ==
As common in Ambler's books, the protagonist is not a professional spy, and is clearly out of his depth. Indeed, the chief Nazi treats him with open contempt, which for much of the book seems amply justified. Yet ultimately the German professional pays dearly for underestimating this amateur — another plot element which was to be repeated in later Ambler books. The book came to be regarded as a classic among spy thrillers, setting out what became some of the genre's basic conventions and immensely influencing later works including the James Bond series.

In fact, Ian Fleming's From Russia With Love shares many plot elements with Journey into Fear. In both books, the protagonist sets out on several days of a journey westwards from Istanbul, during which his life would be in dire danger at every moment; in both there is a Turkish ally who was supposed to guard the protagonist's back but who gets murdered, leaving the protagonist completely exposed; and in both the protagonist is captured by his foes, comes very close to being summarily killed, and is only able to survive and turn the tables by a desperate last-minute improvisation. Though James Bond, unlike Ambler's Graham, is an experienced professional spy, he walks into the trap just as naively as the amateur Graham.

Part of the book is capturing the atmosphere and mindset of the "Phony War" phase during which it was written: France is standing strong and nobody predicts the fall of France within a few months; the Italians are strictly neutral and there is no suggestion that they are about to ally with Germany against Britain; and so on. From the book it seems that Ambler—like many Britons at the time of writing—expected the war to be more or less a replay of the First World War.

Turkey, neutral for most of the Second World War, was a potential important participant. Both Britain and Germany spent considerable effort in trying to get Turkey to join the war on their side - or, failing that, at least ensure it does not join the other side. Thus, though the plot of Ambler's book is fictional, it is set against a very concrete and real background - and at the time of writing, no one could have known for certain what Turkey's part in the war would be.

According to Norman Stone, Ambler's early novels are "halfway between Buchan and Bond, and the difference is the cinema." Thrillers had to be fast-paced to compete with films. Ambler himself had worked on many films. Stone praised Ambler's research on Turkey and Istanbul, and suggested the Orson Welles film adaptation was made as part of a propaganda campaign to encourage Turkey to give up its neutrality in World War 2.

== Adaptations ==
A 1943 film adaptation starred Joseph Cotten, with Orson Welles acting and producing.

A television adaptation was produced in 1966, starring Jeffrey Hunter as Graham.

Another film adaptation was made in 1975, Journey Into Fear, directed by Daniel Mann and starring Sam Waterston and Vincent Price. The film was the first major Hollywood production to be filmed in Vancouver, British Columbia, Canada. In 2001, a Vancouver-based artist, Stan Douglas, remade the movie as a film installation with a recombinant soundtrack.

== See also ==
- MAH (Milli Emniyet Hizmeti - the Turkish National Security Service, Colonel Haki's real-life organization.) The actual head of the agency was Şükrü Âli Ögel.
