= James Broom-Lynne =

British illustrator, playwright (1916–1995)

- Born: James William Broom; 31 October 1916; Islington, London, England
- Died: 1 December 1995 (aged 79); Suffolk, England
- Resting place: St. Mary's Church, East Bergholt, Suffolk
- Education: St. Martin's School of Art
- Known for: Playwright, Author, Illustrator
- Notable work: The Trigon
- Spouse: Catherine Joan Redmore (m. 1948)
- Children: Four
- Parents: James William Broom (father); Esther Slaughter (mother)
- Website: www.broom-lynne.com/Home.htm

James William Broom-Lynne (31 October 1916 – 1 December 1995) was an English artist-designer, novelist (sometimes under the pseudonym of James Quartermain) and playwright who was notable for his illustrations for book jackets.

== Life ==
Islington-born Broom-Lynne was the son of James William Broom, a master bookbinder and Esther (née Slaughter). As a child he attended Eden Grove and St. Aloysius schools, later going on to Saint Martin's Schools of Art. In 1948 he married Catherine Joan Redmore with whom he had two daughters (Victoria and Kate) and one son (Luke). He also had one previous daughter, Gale (born 1940) with Joan Mary Murray (later the mother of novelist Lisa St Aubin de Terán).

Upon his death in 1995 he was cremated and his ashes laid to rest in the graveyard of the Church of St. Mary the Virgin, in the village of East Bergholt, Suffolk, UK, where he and his wife Catherine had lived for over 40 years.

== Surname and pseudonym ==
It not known why or when James Broom choose to append Lynne to his birth name. It may have simply been to distinguish himself from his father with whom he shared an identical name. Although he signed his artwork and illustrations without the hyphen, official records show the correct form as a hyphenated surname. As a novelist he chose the pseudonym of James Quartermain for books published in the American market. This pseudonym is thought to have been derived from his grandmother's surname, Quarterman.

== Career ==
Broom-Lynne learnt his craft at St. Martin's School of Art. He was prolific as a book illustrator, with over 200 dustcovers to his name, particularly for the publishing houses of Heinemann, Macdonald and Michael Joseph. He supplied cover artwork for, amongst others, Anthony Powell, Henry Williamson and H. E. Bates, with whom he collaborated on numerous works including the Larkin family series of novels, The Cruise of the Breadwinner and Love for Lydia.

Of Broom-Lynne's series of dust jackets for Powell's A Dance to the Music of Time Powell's biographer, Hilary Spurling, observed, that Broom-Lynne produced "a series of bold, grainy, instantly recognizable dust jackets that made Music of Time look quite unlike other novels."

During World War II Broom-Lynne served as a warden with the Civil Defence Service in Westminster (1940–1945). It was at this time that he may have first exhibited his work to the general public. Both The West London Press and Chelsea News and The Hampstead News and Golders Green Gazette record artworks credited to Broom-Lynne in exhibitions of civil defence artists in 1941 and 1942 respectively.

Year	Exhibition	Artwork	Notes
1941	2nd national exhibition of civil defence artists	Portrait of senior warden C. Taylor	at the Cooling Galleries, 92 New Bond Street, London.
1942	London exhibition of civil defence artists	"Mary"	address listed as The Studio, 4 Keats Grove, London

His post-war career spanned both freelance and permanent roles. He created the book jackets for the first editions of all twelve novels in the sequence A Dance to the Music of Time by Anthony Powell.

- William Larkins Studio, London, England, art director, 1960–1961
- Service Advertising, London, storyboard director, 1962–1966
- Macdonald & Co. (publishers), London, art editor, 1966–1969
- Art school lecturer in London, 1970–1972
- Art school lecturer, Ipswich School of Art, 1972–1981

In 1959 he provided the illustrations for a front cover of Punch Magazine. On the occasion of its independence from the UK in 1981, he was commissioned to design the interior pages of the passport of Belize

It was in 1960 that he took his first foray into commercial writing when he entered a competition run by The Observer to write an hypothetical broadcast script. His entry titled "Dixon in Disgrace" won first prize. This was followed by a number of plays including The Trigon in 1962, which received mixed reviews although the theatre critics in The New Statesman, The New York Post and Newsday were positive. By 1967 Broom-Lynne had penned his last play and shifted focus onto writing novels.

== Bibliography ==
=== Book Jackets ===
Year	Author	Title	Publisher
1945	George Speaight	Juvenile Drama	MacDonald
1946	H. E. Bates	The Cruise of the Breadwinner	Michael Joseph
1946	Peter Bowman	Beach Red	Michael Joseph
1946	Rosalind Wade	As the Narcissus	MacDonald
1947	George Beardmore	A Tale of Two Thieves	MacDonald
1947	Neil Bell	Forgive us our Trespasses	Eyre & Spottiswoode
1947	Dane Chandos	Abbie	Michael Joseph
1947	Eleanor Clarke	The Bitter Box	Michael Joseph
1947	Mary Fitt	A Fine and Private Place	MacDonald
1947	Mary Fitt	The Banquet Ceases	MacDonald
1947	Garnett Radcliffe	The Lady from Venus	MacDonald
1947	Vita Sackville-West	The Garden	Michael Joseph
1947	Donald Stauffer	The Saint and the Hunchback	Michael Joseph
1947	Mary Brooke Stoker	Dark Heritage	MacDonald
1948	George Beardmore	Far Cry	MacDonald
1948	George Beardmore	Madame Merlin	MacDonald
1948	Mary Fitt	Death and the Bright Day	MacDonald
1949	Marcel Ayme	The Fable and the Flesh	Bodley Head
1949	Charles Dickens	The Posthumous Papers of the Pickwick Club	MacDonald
1950	R. D. Blackmore	Lorna Doone	MacDonald
1950	Derek Barton	Nothing Gross	Michael Joseph
1950	H. E. Bates	The Scarlet Sword	Michael Joseph
1950	Christianna Brand	Cat and Mouse	Michael Joseph
1950	Mary Fitt	Pity for Pamela	MacDonald
1950	William Makepeace Thackeray	Vanity Fair	MacDonald
1951	Vicki Baum	Danger from Deer	Michael Joseph
1951	Mary Fitt	An Ill Wind	MacDonald
1951	Robert Glover	Murderer's Maze	Paul Elek
1951	Eric Hodgins	Blandings' Way	Michael Joseph
1951	Edith Pargeter	Holiday with Violence	Heinemann
1951	Edith Pargeter	Fallen into the Pit	Heinemann
1952	H. E. Bates	The Country of White Clover	Michael Joseph
1952	H. E. Bates	Love for Lydia	Michael Joseph
1952	John Cartwright	False Crest	Werner Laurie
1952	Mary Fitt	Death and the Shortest Day	MacDonald
1952	Paul Gallico	Trial by Terror	Michael Joseph
1952	Gwenda Hollander	The Subborn Field	MacDonald
1952	Dorothy Mackinder	The Miracle of Lemaire	MacDonald
1952	Anthony Powell	A Buyer's Market	Heinemann
1952	Anthony Powell	Afternoon Men	Heinemann
1952	Reginald Thompson	Cry Korea	MacDonald
1952	Henry Williamson	Donkey Boy	MacDonald
1952	Various	BANDWAGON: The Journal of Leisure - Vol. 13	Norman Kark
1953	Caryl Brahms & S. J. Simon	No Nightingales	Michael Joseph
1953	Mary Fitt	The Nighwatchman's Friend	MacDonald
1953	Paul Gallico	The Foolish Immortals	Michael Joseph
1953	James Hanley	Don Quixote Drowned	MacDonald
1953	Compton Mackenzie	Extraordinary Women - Theme & Variations	MacDonald
1953	Anthony Powell	What's Become of Waring	Heinemann
1953	Guy Ramsey	Stop Press Murder	Andrew Dakers
1953	John Trench	Docken Dead	MacDonald
1953	Henry Williamson	Tales of Moorland and Estuary	MacDonald
1953	Henry Williamson	Young Phillip Maddison	MacDonald
1954	Mary Fitt	Love from Elizabeth	Macdonald
1954	Mary Fitt	The Man who Shot Birds	MacDonald
1954	Edith Pargeter	The Soldier at the Door	Heinemann
1954	Anthony Powell	From a View to a Death	Heinemann
1954	John Trench	Dishonoured Bones	MacDonald
1954	Henry Williamson	How Dear is Life	MacDonald
1955	Anthony Powell	The Acceptance World	Heinemann
1955	Anthony Powell	Agents and Patients	Heinemann
1955	Helen Robertson	The Winged Witnesses	MacDonald
1955	W. E. Shewell-Cooper	Pot Plants	Museum Press
1955	Henry Williamson	A Fox Under My Cloak	MacDonald
1956	Robert Cross	Death in Another World	Putnam
1956	Mary Fitt	Sweet Poison	MacDonald
1956	Robin Jenkins	Love is a Fervent Fire	MacDonald
1956	Willard Price	Adventures in Paradise	Heinemann
1956	Helen Robertson	Venice of the Black Sea	MacDonald
1956	Marion Taylor	American Geisha	Geoffrey Bles
1956	Kenneth Tynan	Bull Fever	Quality Book Club
1957	Richard Aldington	Frauds	Heinemann
1957	Christianna Brand	Three Cornered Halo	Michael Joseph
1957	Matthew Head	Murder at the Flea Club	Heinemann
1957	Claude Houghton	More Lives than One	Hutchinson
1957	Anthony Powell	At Lady Molly's	Heinemann
1957	Randolph Stow	Act One: Poems	MacDonald
1957	E. S. Turner	Boys will be Boys	Michael Joseph
1957	Henry Williamson	The Golden Virgin	MacDonald
1958	H. E. Bates	The Darling Buds of May	Michael Joseph
1958	Henry Williamson	Love and the Loveless	MacDonald
1959	H. E. Bates	A Breath of French Air	Michael Joseph
1959	Jonathan Kozol	The Fume of Poppies	Michael Joseph
1959	Richard Llewellyn	Chez Pavan	Michael Joseph
1959	C. E. Vulliamy	Cakes for your Birthday	Michael Joseph
1960	H. E. Bates	When the Green Woods Laugh	Michael Joseph
1960	Robin Jenkins	Some Kind of Grace	MacDonald
1960	Anthony Powell	Casanova's Chinese Restaurant	Heinemann
1960	Helen Robertson	The Chinese Goose	MacDonald
1960	Paul Stanton	Village of Stars	Michael Joseph
1960	C. E. Vulliamy	Justice for Judy	Michael Joseph
1960	Henry Williamson	A Test to Destruction	MacDonald
1961	Marie-Therese Baird	The Scorpions	Heinemann
1961	Dane Chandos	Abbie and Arthur	Michael Joseph
1961	Robin Jenkins	Dust on the Paw	MacDonald
1961	Mary Kelly	The Spoilt Kill	Michael Joseph
1961	Robert Glynn Kelly	A Lament for Barney Stone	Macmillan
1961	Anthony Powell	A Question of Upbringing	Heinemann
1961	C. E. Vulliamy	Tea at the Abbey	Michael Joseph
1961	Henry Williamson	The Innocent Moon	MacDonald
1961	Hugh Ross Williamson	A Wicked Pack of Cards	Michael Joseph
1962	Kate Christie	The Waiting Game	Macmillan
1962	Mary Kelly	Due to a Death	Michael Joseph
1962	Walter Macken	God Made Sunday	Macmillan
1962	Jennie Melville	Come Home and be Killed	Michael Joseph
1962	Anthony Powell	A Dance to the Music of Time	Heinemann
1962	Anthony Powell	The Kindly Ones	Heinemann
1963	Michael Barrett	Task of Destruction	Michael Joseph
1963	Caryl Brahms & S. J. Simon	Don't, Mr. Disraeli	Michael Joseph
1963	Louise King	The Day we were Mostly Butterflies	Michael Joseph
1963	Margaret Laurence	The Tomorrow-tamer and other stories	Macmillan
1963	Jennie Melville	Burning is a Substitute for Loving	Michael Joseph
1963	Mickey Philips	Meat	Michael Joseph
1963	Emmanuel Shinwell	The Labour Story	MacDonald
1963	C. E. Vulliamy	Floral Tribute	Michael Joseph
1963	Henry Williamson	The Power of the Dead	MacDonald
1964	Caryl Brahms & S. J. Simon	Six Curtains for Stroganova	Michael Joseph
1964	Caryl Brahms & S. J. Simon	No Bed for Bacon	Michael Joseph
1964	James Broom-Lynne	The Trigon	Jonathan Cape
1964	Eva Defago	The Deep Freeze Girls	Michael Joseph
1964	Geoffrey Household	Rogue Male	Michael Joseph
1964	Mary Kelly	March to the Gallows	Michael Joseph
1964	Jennie Melville	Murderer's Houses	Michael Joseph
1964	Gladys Mitchell	Death of a Delft Blue	Michael Joseph
1964	Mickey Philips	Lay Them Straight	Michael Joseph
1964	Anthony Powell	The Valley of Bones	Heinemann
1965	Caryl Brahms & S. J. Simon	Titania has a Mother	Michael Joseph
1965	Henry Cecil	Fathers in Law	Michael Joseph
1965	Dick Francis	Odds Against	Michael Joseph
1965	Ric Hardman	The Virgin War	Michael Joseph
1965	Geoffrey Household	Olura	Michael Joseph
1965	Louise King	The Velocipede handicap	Michael Joseph
1965	Jennie Melville	There Lies your Love	Michael Joseph
1965	Gladys Mitchell	Pageant of Murder	Michael Joseph
1965	Randolph Stow	The Merry-Go-Round in the Sea	MacDonald
1965	Miles Tripp	A Quartet of Three	Macmillan
1965	Allan Turpin	The Box - A Conversation Piece	Michael Joseph
1965	Henry Williamson	The Phoenix Generation	MacDonald
1966	Brian Glanville	A Roman Marriage	Michael Joseph
1966	Mary Kelly	Dead Corse	Michael Joseph
1966	Mary Kelly	Dead Man's Riddle	Michael Joseph
1966	Myrna Lockwood	A Mouse is Miracle Enough	Michael Joseph
1966	Gladys Mitchell	The Croaking Raven	Michael Joseph
1966	Anthony Powell	The Soldier's Art	Heinemann
1966	Allan Turpin	Beatrice and Bertha : A Novel-Memoir	Michael Joseph
1966	Allan Turpin	Ladies	Michael Joseph
1966	Henry Williamson	The Dark Lantern	MacDonald
1966	Henry Williamson	A Solitary War	MacDonald
1966	Donald Windham	Two People	Michael Joseph
1967	H. E. Bates	The Distant Horns of Summer	Michael Joseph
1967	Caryl Brahms & S. J. Simon	A Bullet in the Ballet	Michael Joseph
1967	Vicky Brandrick	To Let Furnished	Michael Joseph
1967	Adam Diment	The Dolly Dolly Spy	Michael Joseph
1967	Stanley Ellin	House of Cards	MacDonald
1967	Malcolm Elwin	The Noels and Milbankes	MacDonald
1967	Dick Francis	Blood Sport	Michael Joseph
1967	Giovannino Guareschi	My Home, Sweet Home	MacDonald
1967	Gladys Mitchell	Skeleton Island	Michael Joseph
1967	Jean Nicol	Hotel Regina	Michael Joseph
1967	Jane White	Quarry	Michael Joseph
1967	Henry Williamson	Lucifer before Sunrise	MacDonald
1967	Herbert Fairley Wood	Vimy!	MacDonald
1968	Herbert Fairley Bair	The Coming Together	MacDonald
1968	H. E. Bates	The White Admiral	Dennis Dobson
1968	Adam Diment	The Great Spy Race	Michael Joseph
1968	Madge Garland (editor)	The Indecisive Decade	MacDonald
1968	Giovannino Guareschi	School for Husbands	MacDonald
1968	Elizabeth Jenkins	Ten Fascinating Women	MacDonald
1968	Sue Kaufman	Diary of a Mad Housewife	Michael Joseph
1968	Mary Kelly	A Cold Coming	Michael Joseph
1968	John Kobler	Henry Luce: His Time, Life and Fortune	MacDonald
1968	Anthony Powell	The Military Philosophers	Heinemann
1968	Jane White	Proxy	Michael Joseph
1969	Giovannino Guareschi	Duncan and Clotilda	MacDonald
1969	Barry Weil	Dossier IX	Hamish Hamilton
1970	Henry Williamson	Collected Nature Stories	MacDonald
1971	John Baxter	The cinema of Josef von Sternberg	A. Zwemmer
1973	Anthony Powell	Temporary Kings	Heinemann
1975	James Broom-Lynne	The Colonel's War	W. H. Allen
1975	Anthony Powell	Hearing Secret Harmonies	Heinemann
1975	Anthony Powell	Books Do Furnish a Room	Heinemann
1979	Anthony Powell	Venusberg	Heinemann
	Anthony Powell	A Dance to the Music of Time (complete set)	Heinemann

=== Illustrations ===
Year	Title	Author	Publisher	Notes
1947	The Garden	Vita Sackville-West	Michael Joseph	
1949	Pickwick Papers	Charles Dickens	Macdonald	
1950	Lorna Doone	R. D. Blackmore	Macdonald	Illustrated Classics series
1952	The Country of White Clover	H. E. Bates	Michael Joseph	
1953	Tales of Moorland and Estuary	Henry Williamson	Macdonald	
1953	Soane in Suffolk	Dorothy Stroud	The Sunday Times	Article in newspaper, p. 6
1953	Liszt, Peter Katin		Decca	Record cover
1955	Companions in Cross-stitch	Vivien Ingham	Britannia and Eve magazine	Article in the July 1955 issue, pp. 34–35
1956	American Geisha	Marion Taylor	Geoffrey Bles	
1959	Punch Magazine	-		Front cover, 4 February 1959
1960	366 Days - A zodiacal calendar		Benham & Company, Colchester	Private circulation (verse by Colin Peason)
1976	First day cover		The Post Office (GPO)	To commemorate the bicentenary of the birth of John Constable, born in East Bergholt where James Broom-Lynne lived for 40 years
1977	First day cover		The Post Office (GPO)	To commemorate the 250th anniversary of the birth of Thomas Gainsborough
1981	Interior design for the passport of Belize			Commission for design of the passport of Belize (formerly British Honduras) on its independence from the UK
unknown	Shredded wheat information booklet	Paul Jennings	Nabisco	

=== Plays ===
Year	Title	Type	Notes
1963	The Trigon	Stage Play	Published by Jonathan Cape. First performed in London, 1962. Also performed in 1964 at New Arts Theatre Club, London, starring Prunella Scales and Timothy West. Performed Off-Broadway at Stage 73, October 9, 1965. A Norwegian TV movie entitled En hyggelig fyr was made in 1966. Reviewed in The Stage (4 June 1964).
1963	Ketch	Stage Play	
1963	Charlie and Duke	Radio play	BBC
1965	Return Visit	Radio play	BBC
1965	Triple Bill: The Duke and Duckett, Top People Have Rows Too, To the Home Office with Love	Radio play	BBC
1967	Trilogy: The Applicant, The Golden Marathon, The High Place	Radio play	BBC
1961	The Jokers	Teleplay	ITV (Television Playhouse)
1963	The Living Image	Teleplay	ITV (Armchair Theatre). Reviewed in The Daily Telegraph (19 August 1963).
1967	Wanted: Single Gentleman	Teleplay	BBC (The Wednesday Play). Reviewed in The Listener (26 October 1967).

=== Novels ===
Year	Title	Publisher	Notes
1967	Tobey's Wednesday	Macdonald & Co.	Published in the US as The Wednesday Visitors, Doubleday, 1968. Reviewed in The Times Literary Supplement (20 April 1967).
1968	The Marchioness	Macdonald & Co.	Doubleday, 1969. Reviewed in The New York Times (11 May 1969). and The Times Literary Supplement (6 June 1968).
1969	Drag Hunt	Michael Joseph	Reviewed in The Daily Telegraph (30 October 1969).
1970	The Diamond Hook	Doubleday	Under James Quartermain pseudonym
1972	The Man Who Walked on Diamonds	Doubleday	Under James Quartermain pseudonym
1972	Rock of Diamonds	Doubleday	Under James Quartermain pseudonym. Reviewed in The New York Times (24 September 1972).
1973	The Commuters	Doubleday	
1975	The Colonel's War	W. H. Allen	
1975	The Diamond Hostage	Constable	Under James Quartermain pseudonym
1976	Verdict	W. H. Allen	Reviewed in The Daily Telegraph (30 October 1969).
1978	Jet Race	Putnam	
1978	Crash	Pan Macmillan	
1980	Rogue Diamond	Atheneum	

== Sources ==
- Horne, Alan (1994). The Dictionary of 20th Century British Book Illustrators. United Kingdom: Antique Collectors' Club. OCLC 848940139.
- Peppin, Brigid; Micklethwait, Lucy (1998). Dictionary of British Book Illustrators. John Murray. ISBN 0719539854, 978-0-719539-85-5
- Vinson, James (1973). Contemporary Dramatists. London: St. James Press. ISBN 978-0-900997-17-4. OCLC 231964348
- Moorhouse, Geoffrey: "Getting inside the jacket." (The Guardian. 3 April 1967, p. 5).
- 1964 BBC radio interview.
