= The Valley of Bones =

- First edition
- Author: Anthony Powell
- Cover artist: James Broom-Lynne
- Language: English
- Series: A Dance to the Music of Time
- Publisher: Heinemann
- Publication date: 1964
- Publication place: United Kingdom
- Media type: Print (Hardcover)
- Pages: 242 pp
- Preceded by: The Kindly Ones
- Followed by: The Soldier's Art

The Valley of Bones is the seventh novel in Anthony Powell's twelve-volume series A Dance to the Music of Time. Published in 1964, it is the first of the war trilogy.

The novel is separated into four chapters. The concluding sections of the previous novel, The Kindly Ones, show series protagonist Nick Jenkins trying to join the army. At the beginning of this novel, it is early in 1940 and the reader sees that he has succeeded.

== Themes ==
The Valley of Bones, named for the Vision of the Valley of Dry Bones in Ezekiel, depicts the coming together of very disparate individuals for the massive undertaking of Great Britain preparing for World War II. Unlike in Ezekiel, "The hand and spirit of God are absent; instead, there are men -- never very strong, often ineffective, seldom secure, always troubled....Powell's narrative pictures the partial breakdown of an infantry company: the personal ossification of some men, the cracking of the mold in others, the failure (and even death) of still others."

The novel explores different philosophies toward military life. These include the explicit theories about military life espoused by Alfred de Vigny, who advanced a theory about "the monk of war", and Hubert Lyautey. Nick also observes the implicit attitudes toward military life of those in his unit. That of commanding officer, Rowland Gwatkin, is derived in part from A Song to Mithras from Puck of Pook's Hill, and from Gwatkin's reflections on former military heroes such as Owain Glyndŵr. Gwatkin's failures as a commander, and as a lover, lead to his eventual disenchantment. Other characters in Jenkins' unit are considerably more pragmatic from early on, and they do well in the army. Maelgwyn-Jones says, and Nick finds occasion to repeat, "That day will pass, like other days in the army."

The Valley of Bones also explores the impact of the coming war on civilians. Isobel Jenkins observes, "The pressures of war were forcing action on everyone" and "The war seems to have altered some people out of recognition and made others more than ever like themselves."

== Characters ==
Series protagonist Nick Jenkins, in every volume of A Dance to the Music of Time, is found very closely observing the people he encounters. So far in the series, this has meant observations about those of his own social class as they congregate at boarding schools, in country homes and making their way around London, as well as the bohemians and artists who interact with Nick's social peers. In The Valley of Bones, Nick trains his eye on those serving with him, finding himself "in the midst of a group of middle-class South Welsh bank officers, clerks, and miners few if any of whom have attended university or had any exposure to metropolitan life." His observations lead him to claim to David Pennistone, an officer, that "it is a misapprehension to suppose, as most people do, that the army is inherently different from all other communities".

This list shows the characters in the order in which they appear in the book. Every character in Chapters 1 and 2 is making his or her first appearance in Dance. This is also true of Chapter 4, with the notable exception of the very late, and much anticipated, appearance of Kenneth Widmerpool.

Chapter 1:

- Nick Jenkins, the novel's protagonist and narrator.
- Rowland Gwatkin, Company Commander. In civilian life, he is a banker.
- Idwal Kedward: One of three Platoon Commanders reporting to Gwatkin; he is about 21 years old.
- Evan ("Yanto") Breeze. Along with Nick Jenkins and Idwal Kedward, he is a Platoon Commander reporting to Gwatkin. Breeze is about 25.
- Pendry, a Platoon Sergeant who reports to Nick Jenkins
- CSM Cadwallader. He "like the rest of the 'Other Ranks' of the Battalion, was a miner."
- Lyn Craddock
- Bithel. He commands a platoon and is eventually appointed to higher things.
- Pumphrey, a subaltern. In civilian life, he sells second-hand cars.
- Jones, D.
- Williams, W.H.
- Maelgwyn-Jones
- Iltyd Popkiss, a Church of England military chaplain or padre. At the end of Chapter 1, he delivers a sermon based on the Vision of the Valley of Dry Bones in the Book of Ezekiel, and quotes it in its entirety.
- Fr. Ambrose Dooley, a Catholic priest

Chapter 2:

- Corporal Gwylt: "One of the company's several wits, tiny, almost a dwarf, with a huge head of black curly hair."
- Lance-Corporal Gareth Gittins. He is CSM Cadwallader's brother-in-law. "He was a man not always willing to recognise the artificial and temporary hierarchy imposed by military rank." In civilian life, he works in a mine. He manages the distribution of items in the Company Store to members of the company.
- Sayce. Sayce is "the Company bad character." "Small and lean, with a yellow face and blackened teeth, his shortcomings were not to be numbered." Gwatkin exerts himself, unsuccessfully, to reform Sayce.
- Deafy Morgan. Deafy in civilian life is a miner. "It was probably true to say that Deafy Morgan did not have many thoughts, disturbing or otherwise, because he was not outstandingly bright, although at the same time possessing all sorts of other good qualities." "Deafy Morgan was the precise antithesis of Sayce." "He was prepared at all times to undertake boring or tedious duties ...in what could only be called the most Christlike spirit." He is courtmartialled after his rifle is stolen and sent home to his "nagging wife".
- Bithel's soldier-servant Daniels.
- Major-General Liddament, who is appointed as the new Divisional Commander.
- Rees, J. Davies, E. Davies, Clements Ellis and G. Williams. These men are members of Nick's platoon. Major-General Liddament asks them for their views on porridge.

Chapter 3:

- David Pennistone. Nick runs into Pennistone on a train journey at the beginning of the chapter. They discuss paintings by Bruegel. Nick eventually remembers that he previously met Pennistone at Milly Andriadis' party in A Buyer's Market.
- Barnby. Nick runs into him on the streets of London. Barnby is now an RAF officer who creates disguises for the military.
- Odo Stevens. He shares Nick's billet at Aldershot. His trade prior to the military was selling imitation jewelry. He has also done "a spot of journalism in the local paper."
- Jimmy Brent. He is taking the same course at Aldershot as Nick.
- Croxton. On the course at Aldershot, throws gravel at Nick and Odo.
- Macfeaddan. A schoolmaster in civilian life, assigned to a unit with Brent and Nick in a tactical exercise. He is full of zeal.
- Frederica Budd, Nick's sister-in-law, and her two sons, Edward and Christopher.
- Priscilla Lovell (Nick's sister-in-law and wife of Chips Lovell) and her daughter Caroline.
- Robert Tolland and the woman he is seeing, Flavia Wisebite
- Dicky Umfraville.
- Barry, the child of Frederica's maid Audrey.
- Buster Foxe, now a Commander.

Chapter 4:

- Maureen, a barmaid who works in an unnamed pub in the village near Castlemallock. She is "short and thick-set, with a pale face and lots of black hair." Gwatkin is in love with her. These feelings are not reciprocated.
- Emmot, a Mess waiter at the bar in Castlemallock. Bithel, who is drunk, stumbles and falls against Emmot in a way that looks from some angles as if Bithel is kissing Emmot. This leads Gwatkin to order the arrest of Bithel.
- Pinkus, an Adjutant-Quartermaster.
- Philpotts and Parry, two military officers at Castlemallock
- Kenneth Widmerpool. Kenneth makes his first appearance in the last few pages of the book. He is now a DAAG, and Nick's new boss.

== Cultural references ==
Ekphrastic literature is inspired by works of art, as is famously true of A Dance to the Music of Time. Poems, paintings, painters, games, bar songs, marching songs, parts of the Bible, hymns, crafts, Greek myths, novels, Shakespeare's plays and cultural touchpoints for the British military in the early years of World War II are woven throughout each chapter of The Valley of Bones. And yet, according to the magisterial "Pictures in Powell", "perhaps as a result of the grimness of the early years of the War, it has the fewest references to visual art of all the volumes. Jenkins is isolated from his cultured friends, aristocratic homes, and the galleries of London, and Modernism no longer gets his attention."

Chapter 1:

- The Marine Cemetery by Paul Valéry.
- El Greco. Nick is in an unidentified town, the location of his first assignment in the military. The streets have a "bleak charm; an illusion of tramping through Greco's Toledo".
- Quattrocento portraits. The streets in the unnamed town are "built at constantly changing levels" and remind Nick of the "castellated upland townships of Tuscany" that are represented in the background of Quattrocento portraits.
- Honoré Daumier
- Seven churches of Asia
- The song South of the Border (Down Mexico Way)
- Chapter 3 of Revelation
- Cavaliers and Roundheads
- The poem, "Roland the Paladin"
- Stendhal
- Ernest Meissonier
- The Walrus and the Carpenter (from Lewis Carroll)
- Vision of the Valley of Dry Bones, a prophecy in chapter 37 of the Book of Ezekiel.

Chapter 2:

- Guide me, O Thou Great Redeemer. The first verse is sung by the members of Nick's platoon as they march toward their new assignment.
- The Ash Grove, sung by the company as it marches.
- "Haw-Haw's propaganda broadcasts from Germany". Officers in Nick's company listen to this at night from the Company Store.
- Dai and Shoni stories
- Puck of Pook's Hill
- Judges 5:12. "Arise, Barak, and lead your captives away, O son of Abinoam!" This is cited by Gwatkin in a speech to the Company about the proper care of rifles.
- Owain Glyndŵr, who comes to Nick's mind when he sees how Gwatkin is attired for a thirty-six hour Divisional Exercise.
- A Song to Mithras. Gwatkin discusses this with Nick in the wake of learning about the infidelity of Sgt. Pendry's wife, suggesting that the poem makes one think, "Don't have to bother any more about women."
- A reprise of Guide me, O Thou Great Redeemer. The final verse is sung by Lance Corporal Gittens as he sorts through supplies. Lines from the song are the last words in the text of Chapter 2.

Chapter 3:

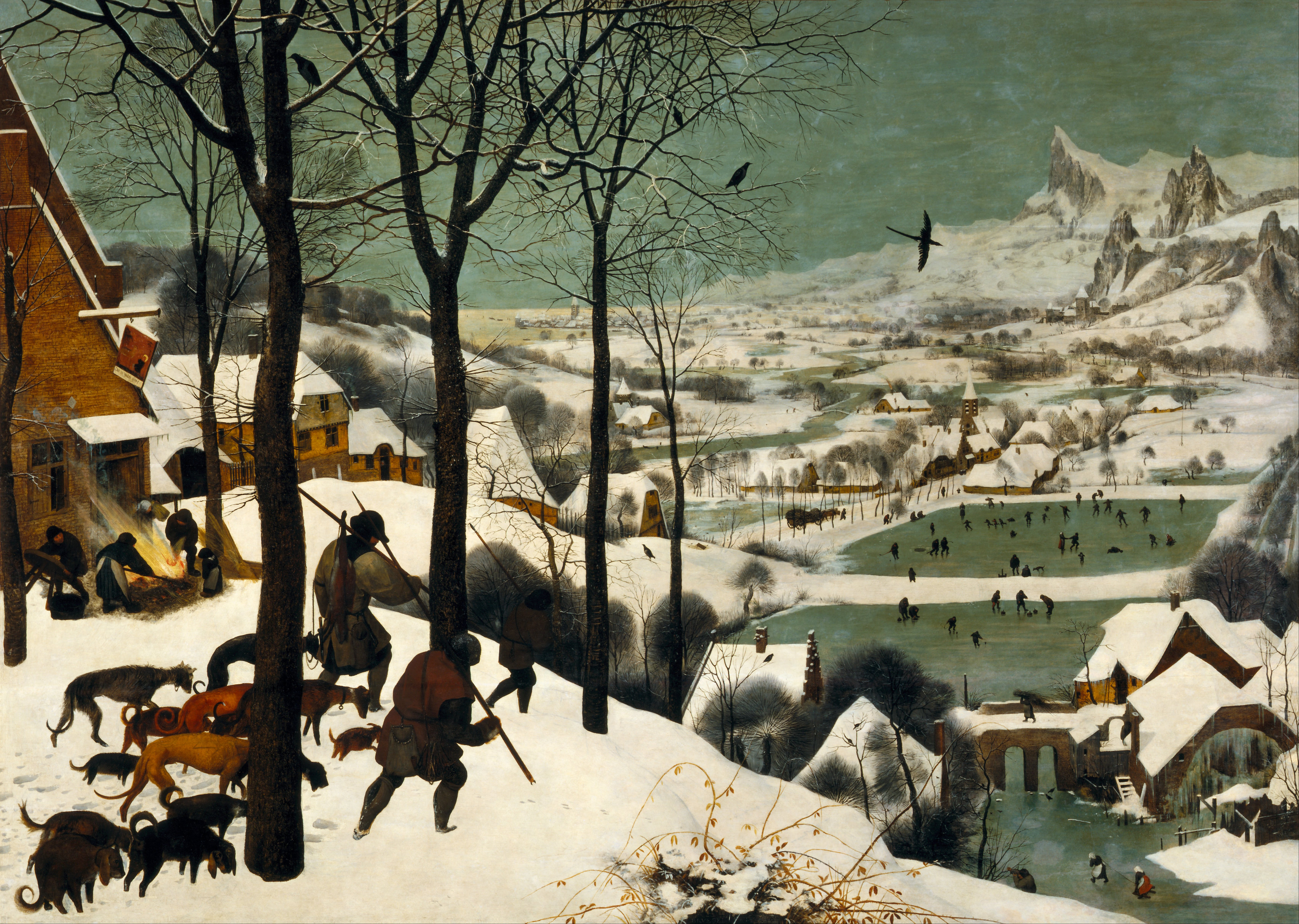
"Hunters in the Snow"

- Without yet knowing each other's names, Nick and David Pennistone stand in line to buy tea on a short break from their train voyage. They fall into a discussion of the Kunsthistorisches Museum and a painting they've both seen there: The Hunters in the Snow by Pieter Bruegel the Elder. Pennistone adds that he also admires Bruegel's Two Monkeys, which he has seen at the Kaiser Friedrich Museum in Berlin.
- Descartes. Pennistone tells Nick he is writing "something awfully boring about Descartes. Really not worth discussing."
- The Servitude et Grandeur Militaire by Alfred de Vigny. Pennistone claims, "Vigny says a soldier's crown is a crown of thorns, amongst its spikes none more painful than passive obedience." Nick responds: "True enough."
- Persephone. Travelling to the course he will be taking for about a month, Nick thinks, "I knew how Persephone must have felt on the first day of her annual release from the underworld."
- Nick mulls over a Dai and Shoni story about a hot air balloon and contemplates what an aerial voyage would feel like.
- Bottom and Titania.
- Feodor Chaliapin, mentioned in an anecdote about Jean Duport. Jean had said at a dinner, "Poor Peter, he really sees the most dreary people. One of the men at dinner had never heard of Chaliapin."
- The Song of the Volga Boatmen. Nick considers singing this to Brent "to confirm his inexperience of opera".
- "The Corps Song" of the Amphibious Engineers Branch of the Royal Engineers Association. This is sung by a detachment of Sappers at the Aldershot training course. Nick interprets it as "a general lament for the emotional conflict of men and women".

Chapter 4:

- Esmond. In the opening sentence of the fourth chapter, Nick reports that he reads this during "rare, intoxicating moments of solitude" at Castlemallock.
- The lines "I pass my evenings in long galleries solely, And that's the reason I'm so melancholy..." from Don Juan, the poem by Lord Byron. Castlemallock calls these associations to Nick's mind.
- In a letter to Nick, Isobel copies out lines from a letter ("said to be of doubtful authenticity") from Lord Bryon to Lady Caroline Lamb, wherein he mentions Castlemallock.
- Hubert Lyautey. Nick says that the conditions of life at Castlemallock ("cursing, quarreling, complaining, inglorious officers") amount to "the negation of Lyautey's ideals".
- The Dolorous Garde. The Ordinance officers at Castlemallock remind Nick of "those misshapen dwarfs who peer from the battlements of Dolorous Garde, bent on doing disservice to whomsoever may cross the drawbridge."
- "A Red Indian war-dance that a group of men were performing."
- The bugle call, Come to the cookhouse door, boys
- Lord Aberavon. He is mentioned by Gwatkin to Nick, who then reflects that Lord Aberavon was the grandfather of Barbara Goring and "the deceased owner of Mr. Deacon's Boyhood of Cyrus, the picture in the Walpole-Wilsons' hall."
- Vortigern and Hengist and Horsa. Nick mentions them to Gwatkin, who is unfamiliar with the names. Nick regrets his "ill-timed pedantry".
- Mephistopheles and Faust.
- The Slayer of Osiris.
- Aphrodite
- Le Morte d'Arthur
- Some of the lyrics to "Mickey McGilligan's Daughter", an Irish bar song.
- Two pillars that mark the entrance to Nowhere ("a pair of stone pillars, much battered by the elements, their capitals surmounted by heraldic animals holding shields"). Nick sees them from a train window as he is being moved from Castlemallock to his new posting.
- A reprise of Guide me, O Thou Great Redeemer.
- Traveling to his new posting, Nick sees a crossroads which reminds him of the crossroads where Oedipus slew his father.

== Settings ==
Chapter 1:

In Chapter 1, Nick Jenkins is just one day into his new role in the army. He is with his platoon in an unidentified town. In this town, he is shown in three settings:

- "A building of gray stone surrounded by rows of spiked railings, a chapel or meeting house." This building is where his platoon members are billeted. It is also referred to as "this tabernacle". Under its portico, a carved scroll says "Sardis 1874". It is described as having the appearance of a Daumier world.
- Then, there is the hotel where Nick and his fellow officers are billeted. It has a bar where the officers congregate to drink in the evenings.
- A parish church in this town, where Popkiss preaches a sermon based on Ezekiel.

Nick is in this town for one week before his company is moved elsewhere. Leaving, he says, "Now at last I was geared to the machine of war, no longer an extraneous organism existing separately in increasingly alien conditions."

Chapter 2:

Nick and his company march out from the unidentified town in Chapter 1. They board a train which sets "out for the north. This was the beginning of a long journey to an unknown destination." Hours later, they exit the train at a port and set out on a night journey over choppy seas. In the morning, they enter a harbor beyond which "stretches a small town, grey houses, factory chimneys." The company is loaded onto another train which eventually arrives at "a small, unalluring industrial town."

Other settings in Chapter 2:

- A disused linen factory turned into barracks for the enlisted men.
- A "forlorn villa on the outskirts of town" for the officers. This villa is located about a mile from the barracks for the enlisted men.
- The Company Office, which is next door to the Company Store. This building is in town, close to the company's barracks. Gwatkin moves his bed into the office and invites Nick to do the same. Nick accepts.
- The Glasshouse: "Where men who have not taken proper care of their rifles do not like to visit a second time."
- "An area some way from our base" where a "thirty-six hour Divisional exercise" takes place; the men are bused to it in a journey that takes "an hour or two".
- Battalion HQ for the thirty-six hour Divisional exercise: "A clearing in some woods".
- Platoon HQ for the thirty-six hour Division exercise: "A dilapidated cowshed, part of the buildings of a small farm."
- A rope bridge over a canal
- "A thatched barn with plenty of straw" where Nick and his men are billeted on the Divisional exercise. This is where General Liddament discusses the value of porridge.

Chapter 3:

- Nick has a very short stay in London (perhaps just one overnight) on his way to Aldershot.
- Aldershot, a town in the Rushmoor district of Hampshire, where Nick has been sent for training. Arriving at Aldershot, Nick recalls last seeing these "weary red cantonments" when he was fourteen. His father's regiment was stationed nearby.
- Laffan's Plain
- Frederica Budd's house. This is a former vicarage. Nick's wife, Isobel, is staying here with Frederica during her pregnancy. Nick visits on a weekend leave from the course at Aldershot. "Not large, the structure was splayed out and rambling, so that the building looked as if its owners had at some period taken the place to pieces, section by section, then put it together again, not always in correct proportions."
- Mytchett, a village in the Borough of Surrey Heath in Surrey. This is where Robert Tolland is stationed before being sent to France.
- Thrubworth. This is the home of Nick's brother-in-law, Lord Warminster (Erridge). It is serving as the headquarters of "one of those frightfully secret inter-service organisations." Buster Foxe is stationed there. It is "only twenty or thirty miles" from the home Frederica is staying in.

Chapter 4:

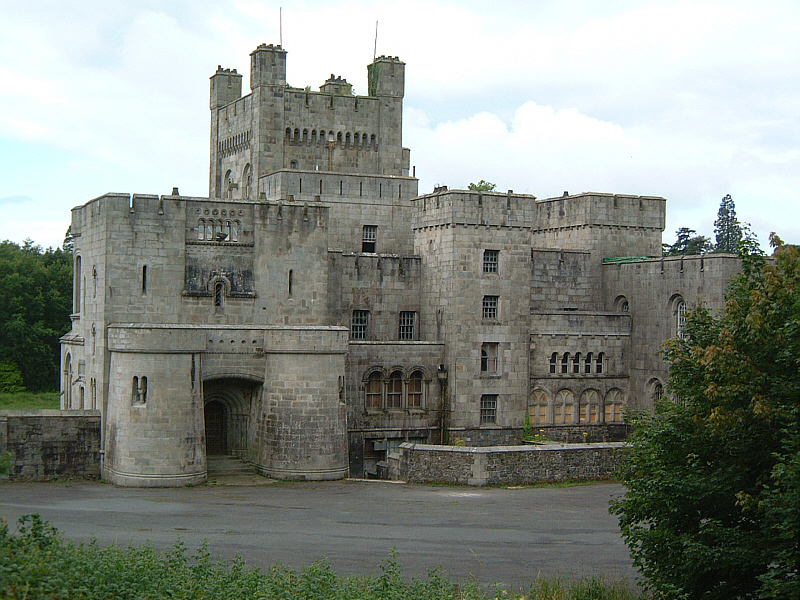
Gosford Castle, the model for Castlemallock

- Castlemallock, in Ireland, which is based on Gosford Castle. This is where the Corps School of Chemical Warfare is situated. "Like other houses of similar size throughout this region, Castlemallock, too large and inconvenient, had lain untenanted for twenty or thirty years before its requisitioning." Nick: "At Castlemallock, I knew despair...Like a million others, I missed my wife, wearied of the officers and men around me, grew to loathe a post wanting even the consolation that one was required to be brave. Castlemallock lacked the warmth of a regiment, gave none of the sense of belonging to an army that exists in any properly commanded unit or formation."
- Two pubs in the village near Castlemallock: M'Coy's and the pub, unidentified by name, where Maureen works
- The DAAG's office in Divisional Headquarters at Nick's final posting in Valley of Bones.

== Incidents ==
In every volume but one of A Dance to the Music of Time, Nick Jenkins characterizes certain events he observes or participates in as "incidents". There are nine such incidents in The Valley of Bones.

Chapter 1:

- On Bithel's first day with the unit, Jenkins and several others play a practical joke on him by stuffing his bed with a dummy. Bithel, who is very inebriated, has an unexpected reaction to this. Nick thinks to himself later, "I did not have much time to think over the incident, because I was very tired."

Chapter 2:

- Gwatkin, while passing by a vehicle parking area with Kedward and Jenkins, tries unsuccessfully to drive a bren-carrier. Nick says that this illustrates how Gwatkin responds to failure: "Leaving barracks that evening there was a small incident to illustrate the way in which he took failure to heart." "For a time, Gwatkin heaved up and down there, as if riding one of the cars on a warlike merry-go-round; then completely defeated by the machinery, perhaps out of order, he climbed slowly to the ground and rejoined us."
- "Deafy Morgan, by definition an easy victim to ambush, was surrounded by four young men, two of whom threatened him with pistols, while the other two possessed themselves of his rifle." ("The incident occurred in a wood not far from the outskirts of the town.")
- "The incident at the road-blocks." This is the situation that leads to the death of Sgt. Pendry.

Chapter 3:

- Odo Stevens deals with Croxton, who during an exercise was responsible for "a hail of small stones that continued to spatter" over Stevens and Nick. Stevens deals with this by giving "him a couple in the ribs with my rifle butt". Nick says, "This incident showed he could be disagreeable, if so disposed".
- When Brent is describing his affair with Jean Duport to Nick, Nick—who had also been having an affair with Jean—tries to find out when the affair started. Brent complies, describing a dinner at the Carlton Grill. Nick says, "The fact that the dinner party was to be at the Carlton Grill pinpointed the incident in my mind".
- Odo Stevens is "returned to unit" because he "cut one of those bloody lectures and got caught". Nick reports that "The course ended without further incident of any note".

Chapter 4:

- Overhearing two men, not in his unit, squabbling in the halls of Castlemallock, Nick reflects, "This sort of incident lowered the spirits to an infinitely depressed level".
- Learning from Gwatkin of Gwatkin's extreme ardor for Maureen, Nick suggests that Gwatkin invite her out. When Gwatkin asks if Nick means that Gwatkin should attempt to seduce Maureen, Nick agrees that this is what he means. This astonishes Gwatkin. Nick reflects to himself, "Such an incident in opera, I thought, might suggest a good basis for an aria."
- Nick recollects the incident from Chapter 1 involving Bithel and the incident from Chapter 2 involving Gwatkin and the bren-carrier.

== Critical reception ==
Robert Morris, in his influential 1968 book about Anthony Powell, describes the novel this way: "...a highly civilized discussion of the natural, but uncivilizing phenomena of war and its peculiar code....Even during war it is, in the last analysis, the human that must interpret the abstract, and any machine geared to reliance on human perfection must become slave to human fallibility. The Valley of Bones throbs with this humanizing impulse, worked compellingly into the main themes."

Terry Teachout, while saying that he rereads A Dance to the Music of Time every two or three years and that he increasingly believes the novel sequence constitutes great literature, expressed a reservation about The Valley of Bones and the two additional novels (The Soldier's Art and The Military Philosophers) in the war sequences of the series. The reservation is that these novels track Anthony Powell's own wartime experiences "too closely for comfort": "Yet even his most ardent admirers have been known to suggest on occasion that 'Dance' might be too closely tied to the facts of Powell's own life to flourish as a fully independent work of art."

Bernard Bergonzi, in The New York Review of Books in 1964, wrote, "...The Valley of Bones is one of the solidest and most entertaining volumes in the sequence, enabling its author to cast a cool and penetrating eye on the complex follies inherent in military life."

James Tucker, in his 1976 book on the novels of Anthony Powell, says of The Valley of Bones, "Beautifully low-profile comedy, it attempts nothing beyond the wholly credible. It is the period of phoney war treated with the most delicate understanding of banality, bathos, aimlessness."

Malcolm Muggeridge wrote a critical review of The Valley of Bones in the Evening Standard in 1964 in which he took the occasion to write that the entire series was a failure. This led to the breakup of the friendship between Muggeridge and Anthony Powell.

The Valley of Bones is dedicated to Arthur & Rosemary (Arthur Mizener and his wife, Rosemary).
