= Allan Ker =

- Born: 5 March 1883; Edinburgh, Scotland
- Died: 12 September 1958 (aged 75); Hampstead, England
- Burial place: West Hampstead Cemetery
- Military career
- Allegiance: United Kingdom
- Branch: British Army
- Rank: Major
- Units: Gordon Highlanders
- Conflicts: First World War
- Awards: Victoria Cross

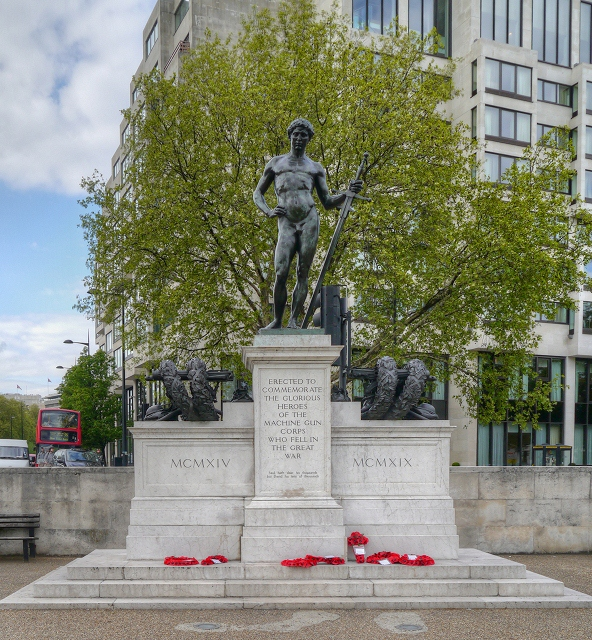
The Machine Gun Corps Memorial, Hyde Park Corner

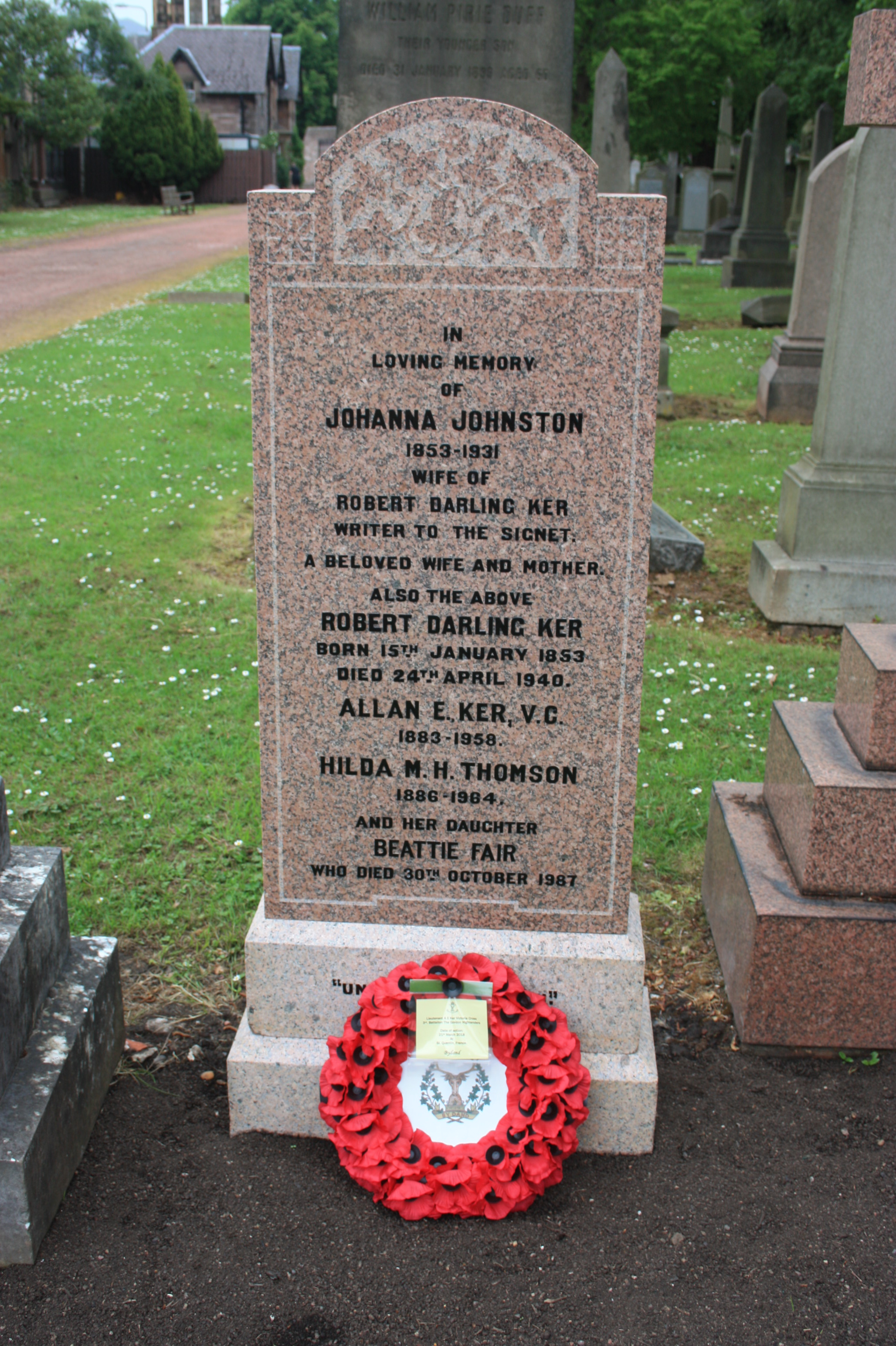
Memorial to Ker at Grange Cemetery

Major Allan Ebenezer Ker VC (5 March 1883 – 12 September 1958) was a British Army officer and a Scottish recipient of the Victoria Cross (VC), the highest and most prestigious award for gallantry in the face of the enemy that can be awarded to British and Commonwealth forces.

== Life ==
He was born in Edinburgh on 5 March 1883 the son of Robert Darling Ker WS (1853-1940) and his wife Johanna Johnston. The family lived at 14 Findhorn Place in the Grange district.

He was educated at Edinburgh Academy. He then studied law at the University of Edinburgh. Before the First World War he had his own legal practice at 5 George Street in the New Town and was living at "St Abbs", a villa on Russell Place in Trinity.

In 1908 he joined a unit of the Territorial Force: the Queen's Edinburgh Mounted Rifles. In 1914 he went to Aberdeen to settle the affairs of his cousin, Captain Arthur Milford Ker who had been killed in the first weeks of the First World War and Allan was persuaded to join his cousin's regiment; the Gordon Highlanders.

He was 35 years old, and a lieutenant in the 3rd Battalion, The Gordon Highlanders, British Army, attached 61st Battalion, Machine Gun Corps during the First World War when the following deed took place for which he was awarded the Victoria Cross (VC).

On 21 March 1918 near Saint-Quentin, France, when the enemy had penetrated the British line, Lieutenant Ker, with one Vickers gun, succeeded in holding up the attack, inflicting many casualties. He then stayed at his post with a sergeant and several men who had been badly wounded, beating off bayonet attacks with revolvers, the Vickers gun having been destroyed. Although exhausted from want of food and gas poisoning, as well as from fighting and attending to the wounded, Lieutenant Ker only surrendered when all his ammunition was spent and the position overrun - he had managed to hold 500 of the enemy off for three hours.

He was, however, captured in the event and spent the remainder of the war as a prisoner of war only being released in December 1918, a few weeks after the armistice of 11 November 1918. He was gazetted for the VC on 4 September 1919 and was presented the medal personally by King George V at Buckingham Palace on 26 November 1919. On 11 November 1920 he was one of the 100 VC winners chosen as the guard of honour, escorting the gun carriage to the Tomb of the Unknown Soldier in Westminster Abbey.

He later achieved the rank of major. He was demobbed in 1922 and went back to practising law, but in London rather than Edinburgh.

In 1926 he was one of four VC holders who laid a wreath after the dedication of the Machine Gun Corps Memorial at Hyde Park Corner. The others were Arthur Henry Cross, Reginald Graham, and William Allison White.

In the Second World War he served on the Directorate of the Chief of the Imperial General Staff. His duties included attendance at the Potsdam Conference in July/August 1945.

He died at New Garden Hospital in Hampstead, North London, on 12 September 1958 aged 75. He is buried in West Hampstead Cemetery but was also memorialised in 2018 on his parents' restored grave in Grange Cemetery in south Edinburgh.

== Recognition ==
Anthony Powell later used him as the inspiration for the character of Colonel Finn in his novels The Soldier's Art (1966) and The Military Philosophers (1968).

A plaque was erected on his birthplace at 16 Findhorn Place in The Grange, Edinburgh in 2018.

== Honours ==

Ribbon	Description	Notes
	Victoria Cross (VC)	4 September 1919.
	British War Medal	
	WWI Victory Medal	With MID Oakleaf.
	Defence Medal	
	War Medal 1939–1945	
	King George V Silver Jubilee Medal	6 May 1935.
	King George VI Coronation Medal	12 May 1937.
	Queen Elizabeth II Coronation Medal	2 June 1953.
	Order of Military Merit	Knight.; Awarded by Brazil.

== The medal ==
His VC is on display in the Lord Ashcroft Gallery at the Imperial War Museum, London.

== Bibliography ==
- Scotland's Forgotten Valour (Graham Ross, 1995)
- Monuments to Courage (David Harvey, 1999)
- Ashcroft, Michael (2007) [2006]. Victoria Cross Heroes. London: Headline Review. ISBN 978-0-7553-1633-5.
- Buzzell, Nora, ed. (1997). The Register of the Victoria Cross. Cheltenham, Gloucestershire: This England Alma House. ISBN 0-906324-27-0.
- Gliddon, Gerald (2013) [2004]. Spring Offensive 1918. VCs of the First World War. Stroud, Gloucestershire: The History Press. ISBN 978-0-7524-8730-4.
