= The Kindly Ones =

The Kindly Ones may refer to:

- The Kindly Ones, a euphemistic reference to the Furies in Greek mythology
- The Kindly Ones (Littell novel), a 2006 translation of French novel Les Bienveillantes by Jonathan Littell
- The Kindly Ones (Powell novel), a 1962 novel by Anthony Powell, sixth in the novel sequence A Dance to the Music of Time
- The Sandman: The Kindly Ones, a 1996 volume of The Sandman comic book series by Neil Gaiman
- The Kindly Ones, a 1987 science fiction novel by Melissa Scott
