= Books Do Furnish a Room =

Book by Anthony Powell

- First edition cover
- Author: Anthony Powell
- Cover artist: James Broom-Lynne
- Language: English
- Series: A Dance to the Music of Time
- Publisher: Heinemann
- Publication date: 1971
- Publication place: United Kingdom
- Media type: Print (hardback and paperback)
- ISBN: 0-316-71544-1 (HB)
- Preceded by: The Military Philosophers
- Followed by: Temporary Kings

Books Do Furnish a Room is a novel by Anthony Powell, the tenth in the twelve-novel sequence A Dance to the Music of Time. It was first published in 1971 and, like the other volumes, remains in print.

== Synopsis ==
The book conveys the atmosphere of post-war austerity as the characters that have survived attempt to resume their former life after the interruption of the conflict. Nicholas Birns has observed that “the novel’s title connotes a provisional postwar recovery.”

It deals in particular with the chaotic career of X. Trapnel as a writer and the brief life of the new magazine Fission. This is sponsored by Rosie Manasch and published by the left-wing firm of Quiggin and Craggs (the latter now knighted and married to Gypsy Jones). Also working for the firm is Ada Leintwardine, who Nick Jenkins first meets while she is acting as temporary secretary to Sillery, and to whom Quiggin proposes marriage after the firm is taken over at the end of the novel. Associated with the magazine are 'Books-do-furnish-a-room' Bagshaw, the general editor; Nick, who acts as reviews editor; and Kenneth Widmerpool, now a Labour MP, writing on politics and economics.

As always, the story is narrated by Nick Jenkins, who is currently researching a book on Robert Burton's Anatomy of Melancholy, quotations from which are frequently applied by way of commentary to the different situations he encounters in the novel. “Given the emphasis on literature in Books Do Furnish A Room, we see more of Nicholas Jenkins as a writer than ever before.” During its course Nick and his Tolland relations attend the funeral after Erridge's early death; it is also attended by Widmerpool and his wife, Pamela, who typically manages to disrupt the ceremony and the family gathering at Erridge’s living quarters at Thrubworth afterwards. Towards the end of the novel, she leaves Widmerpool to live in squalor with Trapnel for awhile, finally returning to Widmerpool after scattering the manuscript of Trapnel's new novel, Profiles in String, into the canal for him to discover on returning from an evening's drinking.

The New York Times reviewer Raymond A. Sokolov noted that Books Do Furnish a Room includes a delicious collection of made-up book titles. X. Trapnel's "Camel Ride to the Tomb" is included in Imaginary Books: Lost, Unfinished and Fictive Works Found Only in Other Books.

Books Do Furnish a Room is dedicated to editor and publisher Rupert Hart-Davis.
