= Ezekiel 35 =

Book of Ezekiel, chapter 35

- ← chapter 34 chapter 36 →
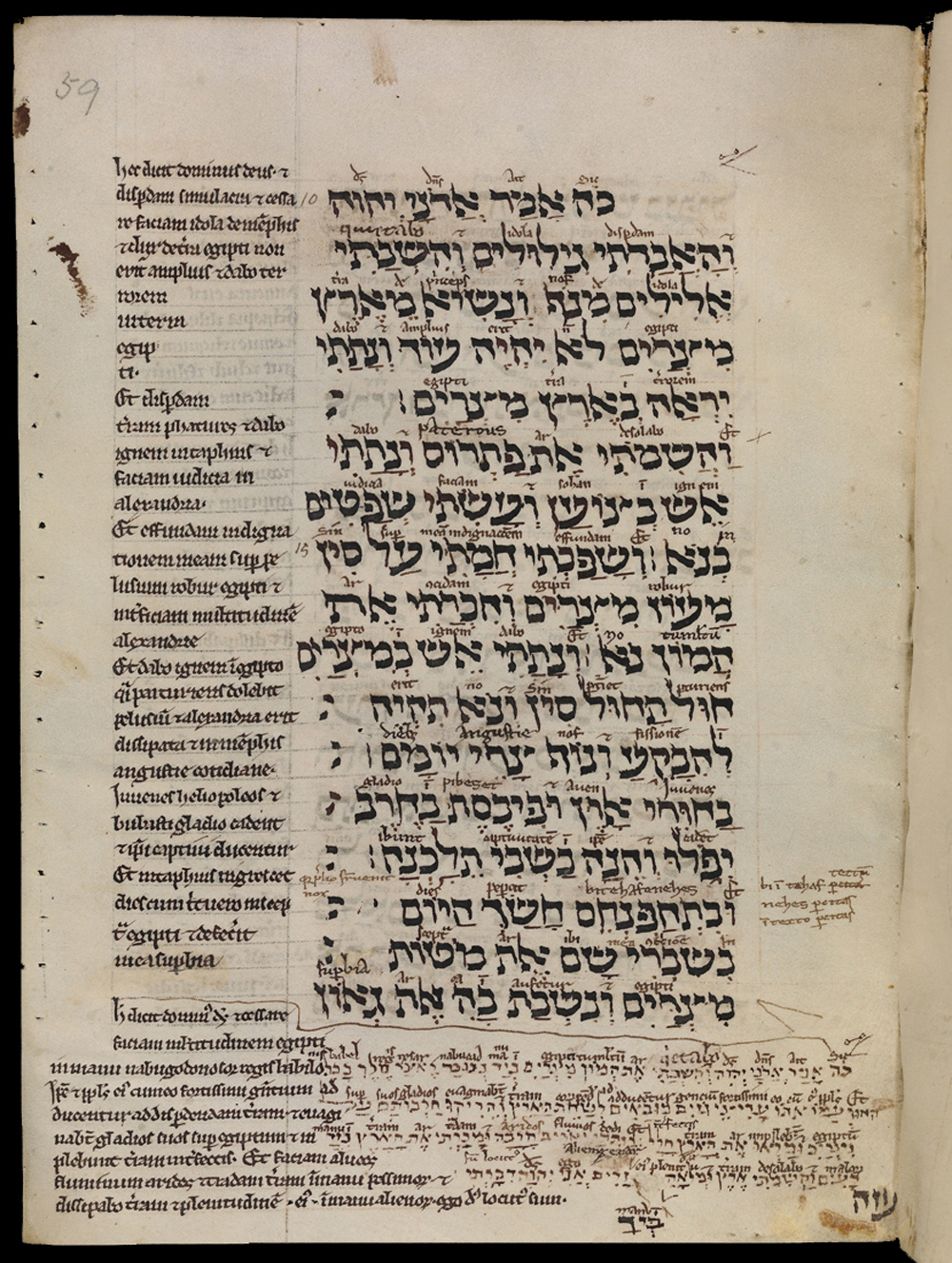
- Book of Ezekiel 30:13–18 in an English manuscript from the early 13th century, MS. Bodl. Or. 62, fol. 59a. A Latin translation appears in the margins with further interlineations above the Hebrew.
- Book: Book of Ezekiel
- Hebrew Bible part: Nevi'im
- Order in the Hebrew part: 7
- Category: Latter Prophets
- Christian Bible part: Old Testament
- Order in the Christian part: 26

Ezekiel 35 is the thirty-fifth chapter of the Book of Ezekiel in the Hebrew Bible or the Old Testament of the Christian Bible. This book contains the prophecies attributed to the prophet/priest Ezekiel, and is one of the Books of the Prophets. This chapter contains a prophecy against Mount Seir in Edom, to the south of Judah. Biblical commentator Susan Galambush pairs it with an oracle promising "restoration to the mountains of Israel" in the following chapter.

== Text ==
The original text was written in the Hebrew language. This chapter is divided into 15 verses.

=== Textual witnesses ===
Some early manuscripts containing the text of this chapter in Hebrew are of the Masoretic Text tradition, which includes the Codex Cairensis (895), the Petersburg Codex of the Prophets (916), Aleppo Codex (10th century), and Codex Leningradensis (1008). Fragments containing parts of this chapter were found among the Dead Sea Scrolls, that is, the Ezekiel Scroll from Masada (Mas 1d; MasEzek; 1–50 CE) with extant verses 11–15.

There is also a translation into Koine Greek known as the Septuagint, made in the last few centuries BC. Extant ancient manuscripts of the Septuagint version include Codex Vaticanus (B; $\mathfrak{G}$^{B}; 4th century), Codex Alexandrinus (A; $\mathfrak{G}$^{A}; 5th century) and Codex Marchalianus (Q; $\mathfrak{G}$^{Q}; 6th century). (Note: Ezekiel is missing from the extant Codex Sinaiticus.)

== Verse 2 ==
"Son of man, set your face against Mount Seir and prophesy against it" (NKJV)

- "Son of man" (Hebrew: בן־אדם ḇen-’ā-ḏām): this phrase is used 93 times to address Ezekiel.

Galambush suggests that "the choice of Mount Seir as the counterpart to the mountains of Israel is puzzling", noting that Ezekiel's oracle against Edom in Ezekiel 25:12–14 is "a brief, virtually pro forma condemnation of Israel's neighbour for taking advantage of Israel's broken condition. The motivation for locating a second, more vehement condemnation here is obscure.

== Verse 10 ==
Because you have said, ‘These two nations and these two countries shall be mine, and we will possess them’, although the Lord was there.

This verse suggests that the Edomites planned to take possession of the promised land, Israel and Judah, following the Israelites' deportation to Babylon.

== Verse 15 ==
As you rejoiced because the inheritance of the house of Israel was desolate, so I will do to you;
you shall be desolate, O Mount Seir, as well as all of Edom—all of it!
Then they shall know that I am the Lord.”’ (NKJV)

Cross reference: Obadiah 1:12,15; Lamentations 4:21

== See also ==
- Edom
- Israel
- Mount Seir
- Related Bible parts: Genesis 36, Isaiah 34, Jeremiah 49, Lamentations 4, Ezekiel 25, Obadiah

== Bibliography ==
- Bromiley, Geoffrey W. (1995). International Standard Bible Encyclopedia: vol. iv, Q-Z. Eerdmans. ISBN 9780802837844.
- Brown, Francis; Briggs, Charles A.; Driver, S. R. (1994). The Brown-Driver-Briggs Hebrew and English Lexicon (reprint ed.). Hendrickson Publishers. ISBN 978-1565632066.
- Clements, Ronald E (1996). Ezekiel. Westminster John Knox Press. ISBN 9780664252724.
- Gesenius, H. W. F. (1979). Gesenius' Hebrew and Chaldee Lexicon to the Old Testament Scriptures: Numerically Coded to Strong's Exhaustive Concordance, with an English Index. Translated by Tregelles, Samuel Prideaux (7th ed.). Baker Book House.
- Joyce, Paul M. (2009). Ezekiel: A Commentary. Continuum. ISBN 9780567483614.
- The Nelson Study Bible. Thomas Nelson, Inc. 1997. ISBN 9780840715999.
- Würthwein, Ernst (1995). The Text of the Old Testament. Translated by Rhodes, Erroll F. Grand Rapids, MI: Wm. B. Eerdmans. ISBN 0-8028-0788-7.
