= The Cruise of the Breadwinner =

1946 novella by H. E. Bates

- First edition
- Author: H. E. Bates
- Cover artist: James Broom-Lynne
- Language: English
- Genre: War fiction
- Publisher: Michael Joseph
- Publication date: 1946
- Publication place: United Kingdom
- Media type: Print
- Pages: 63

The Cruise of the Breadwinner is a novella by the British author H. E. Bates. It was first published in 1946 and has been printed a number of times since. Much like the acclaimed novel Fair Stood the Wind for France, it is one of Bates' war-oriented pieces.

== Main characters ==
- Snowy – Young cabin boy on board the Breadwinner
- Gregson – Old, fat, tender and distinctly working-class captain of the Breadwinner
- Jimmy – Young engineer on board the Breadwinner
- Karl Messner – Young, quiet German pilot
- "The English Boy" – Young, upper-class RAF pilot

== Plot summary ==
The story takes place on board the Breadwinner, an old battered fishing boat, contributing to the war effort by carrying out a routine patrol of a particular stretch of coast in the English Channel. The main character, a young boy called Snowy, has volunteered to help and spends much of his time dreaming about the pair of binoculars that the boat's skipper, Mr Gregson, has promised him. The third and final member of the crew is Jimmy, a young engineer with a wife and three children. The story's events, which take place in a single day, begin simply enough. They travel south until Snowy hears a dogfight further out to sea. They head towards the sound and soon hear whistling. Upon arriving at the source of the distress signal, they find a young English RAF pilot who has been shot down but is not injured. The pilot informs them that he's hit a German plane and believes it to have crashed somewhere to the west. He requests that they attempt to find the German pilot and, after a brief search, they succeed. Despite Jimmy's protestations that they should not be helping the enemy, they help the German aboard and Snowy is sent to make the pilots some tea. Whilst he is below deck, another Luftwaffe plane flies at the boat, shooting and charging at the deck. Snowy returns to find the attack has killed Jimmy and severely injured the two pilots. Gregson has also been hit but is not seriously wounded. It starts to rain and Gregson and Snowy help the pilots below deck. Whilst trying to get the engine going, they realise that bullets have penetrated the tank and much of the boat's fuel has been lost. Whilst Gregson goes on deck to hoist the sails, Snowy discovers that the German pilot has left his binoculars unattended. He takes them and finds himself hoping the German will die so that he will be able to keep them. As the story draws to an end, the Breadwinner is racing to get back to shore whilst the pilots are still alive.

== Literary features ==
The personal developments that main character Snowy undergoes over the course of the novella mean that the piece could accurately be described as a Bildungsroman - a coming of age story - in which Snowy's ultimate realisation of just how insignificant the binoculars are serves as something of an epiphany. The emphasised youth and common nature of the two pilots demonstrates the author's notions of equality and also provides a general criticism of war and racism. Gregson's conclusive denouncement "Why don't they let our lives alone? God damn and blast them - all of them, all of them, all the bastards, all over the world!" could also be described as an Everyman perspective, a summary of the general attitude towards the war.

== See also ==
- H. E. Bates
- War fiction
- Bildungsroman
- Fair Stood the Wind for France
