= Temporary Kings =

Novel by Anthony Powell

- First edition cover
- Author: Anthony Powell
- Cover artist: James Broom-Lynne
- Language: English
- Series: A Dance to the Music of Time
- Publisher: Heinemann
- Publication date: 1973
- Publication place: United Kingdom
- Preceded by: Books Do Furnish a Room
- Followed by: Hearing Secret Harmonies

Temporary Kings is a novel by Anthony Powell, the penultimate in his twelve-volume novel, A Dance to the Music of Time. It was published in 1973 by Heinemann and remains in print, as does the rest of the sequence. It takes place at a fictional 1958 literary symposium in Venice.

Temporary Kings has been characterized as a novel in the post-war consensus of literary compromise. It also demonstrates Powell's evocation of art at all levels, most notably a (fictional) Venetian ceiling painting by Giovanni Battista Tiepolo

Temporary Kings received the W. H. Smith Prize in 1974.

It is dedicated to Roland Gant, Powell's editor, who Powell called "one in a million."

== Critical reception ==
In its review of Temporary Kings in 1973, The Times said the book was an improvement on the previous installment, Books Do Furnish a Room, which it said 'showed a certain staleness'. It added: "With 11 out of the 12 books in the series now before us, it is possible to speak fairly confidently of the work as a whole. In spite of that air of being our English Proust which has sometimes grated on those who like the French one, Mr Powell is unlikely to imitate the obsessional heightening in late Proust, nor to spring a redemption on us. His nature is to be uniform: there is hardly a ragged edge or an un-calculated incongruity anywhere in this urbane discourse, where the catastrophes are never witnessed, only inferred from scenes in themselves comic. If the new characters have not quite the flavour of the earlier Gileses and Jeavonses, and the range of the social panorama now appears less than it once seemed, the flow of reappearances and transformations is powerful enough to carry the series through that 'Dance to the Music of Time' whose discipline and formal rhythm do recall Poussin, the artist its title invokes: except that it is a great deal more fun."
