= Roy Fuller =

English writer

Roy Fuller

Roy Broadbent Fuller CBE (11 February 1912 – 27 September 1991) was an English writer, known mostly as a poet.

He was born in Failsworth, Lancashire to lower-middle-class parents Leopold Charles Fuller and his wife Nellie (1888–1949; née Broadbent), whose father was clerk to a workhouse master. His father, born in Fulham in 1884, was the illegitimate son of Minnie Augusta Fuller (born 1863), daughter of a Soham police constable, Richard Fuller. Orphaned and subsequently raised with his elder sister, Minnie (later Matron of the Manchester Royal Infirmary) at Caithness, Leopold worked his way up to the position of works manager (also later becoming a director) of a rubber-proofing mill at Hollinwood, Lancashire, dying in 1920.

Fuller was subsequently raised in Blackpool, Lancashire, and educated at Blackpool High School. Fuller was articled to a solicitor in 1928, in which year his first poem was published in the Sunday Referee. After qualifying as a solicitor in 1933, he worked for The Woolwich Equitable Building Society, ending his career as head of the legal department and a director. He served in the Royal Navy from 1941 to 1946.

Poems (1939) was his first book of poetry. He also began to write fiction, including crime novels, in the 1950s, and wrote several volumes of memoirs. As a poet he became identified, on stylistic grounds, with The Movement. He was Professor of Poetry at Oxford University from 1968 to 1973.

He received a C.B.E. and Queen's Gold Medal for Poetry in 1970 and the Cholmondeley Award from the Society of Authors in 1980. From 1972 to 1979 he was a member of the Board of Governors of the BBC.

The poet John Fuller is his son. In 1966 Anthony Powell dedicated to Fuller his novel The Soldier's Art, the eighth volume of his masterwork, A Dance to the Music of Time.

== Books ==
- Poems (1939)
- The Middle of a War (1942)
- A Lost Season (1944)
- Savage Gold (1946)
- With My Little Eye (1948)
- Epitaphs and Occasions (1949)
- The Second Curtain (1953)
- Counterparts (1954)
- Image of a Society (1956)
- Brutus's Orchard (1957)
- Fantasy and Fugue (1956) [This was republished as Murder in Mind.]
- Byron for Today (1958)
- The Ruined Boys (1959)
- Buff (1965)
- My Child, My Sister (1965)
- New Poems (1968)
- Off Course: Poems (1969)
- The Carnal Island (1970)
- Seen Grandpa Lately? (1972)
- Song Cycle from a Record Sleeve (1972)
- Tiny Tears (1973)
- Owls and Artificers: Oxford lectures on poetry (1974)
- Professors and Gods: Last Oxford Lectures on Poetry (1975)
- From the Joke Shop (1975)
- The Joke Shop Annexe (1975)
- An Ill-Governed Coast: Poems (1976)
- Poor Roy (1977)
- The Reign of Sparrows (1980)
- Souvenirs (1980)
- Fellow Mortals: An anthology of animal verse (1981)
- More About Tompkins, and other light verse (1981)
- House and Shop (1982)
- The Individual and his Times: A selection of the poetry of Roy Fuller (1982) with V. J. Lee
- Vamp Till Ready: Further memoirs (1982)
- Upright Downfall (1983) with Barbara Giles and Adrian Rumble
- As from the Thirties (1983)
- Home and Dry: Memoirs III (1984)
- Mianserin Sonnets (1984)
- Subsequent to Summer (1985)
- Twelfth Night: A personal view (1985)
- New and Collected Poems, 1934-84 (1985)
- Outside the Canon (1986)
- Murder in Mind (1986)
- Lessons of the Summer (1987)
- Consolations (1987)
- Available for Dreams (1989)
- Stares (1990)
- Spanner and Pen: Post-war memoirs (1991)
