= Vision of the Valley of Dry Bones =

Vision in chapter 37 of the Book of Ezekiel

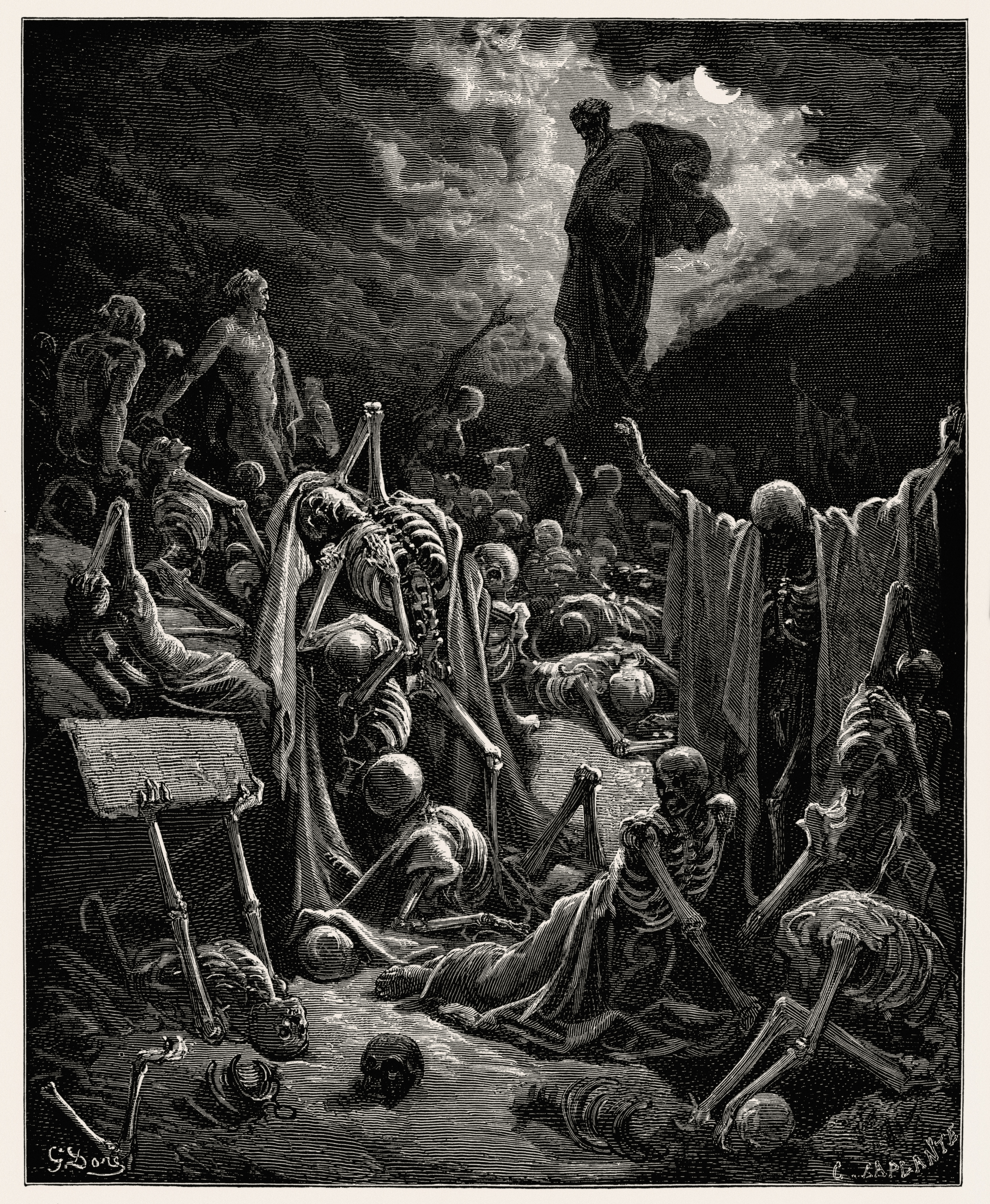
Engraving of "The Vision of The Valley of The Dry Bones" by Gustave Doré

The Vision of the Valley of Dry Bones (or The Valley of Dry Bones or The Vision of Dry Bones) is a prophecy in chapter 37 of the Book of Ezekiel, with the event also being alluded to in Al-Baqarah.

== Content ==
The chapter details a vision revealed to the prophet Ezekiel, conveying a dream-like realistic-naturalistic depiction.

In his vision, the prophet sees himself standing in a valley full of dry human bones. He is commanded to carry a prophecy. Before him, the bones connect into human figures; then the bones become covered with tendons, flesh, and skin. Then God reveals the bones to the prophet as the people of Israel in exile and commands the prophet to carry another prophecy in order to revitalize these human figures, to resurrect them, and to bring them to the Land of Israel.

== Literary references ==
Herman Melville, early in his novella “Benito Cereno”, provides much description of the strange behavior and appearance of another ship, the San Dominick. As the captain and some crew of another ship get closer to it, Melville writes this paragraph:

As the whale-boat drew more and more nigh, the cause of the peculiar pipe-clayed aspect of the stranger was seen in the slovenly neglect pervading her. The spars, ropes, and great part of the bulwarks looked woolly from long unacquaintance with the scraper, tar, and the brush. Her keel seemed laid, her ribs put together, and she launched, from Ezekiel’s Valley of Dry Bones.

The novelist Anthony Powell named The Valley of Bones, the seventh novel in the sequence A Dance to the Music of Time, for this part of Ezekiel 37. The novel is about the opening days of World War II. The entirety of the relevant part of Ezekiel 37 is read from the pulpit at the end of Chapter 1 by a Church of England padre to a motley group of mostly Welsh miners and bankers as well as some officers from England's upper classes as they begin to form a company. The padre suggests that not just they, but all of the British army as it prepares for war, should take this image as a way of thinking about how they need to come together. Unlike in Ezekiel, though, as the novel unfolds,

The hand and spirit of God are absent; instead, there are men – never very strong, often ineffective, seldom secure, always troubled....Powell's narrative pictures the partial breakdown of an infantry company: the personal ossification of some men, the cracking of the mold in others, the failure (and even death) of still others.

— Morris 1968, pp. 218–230

Poet Glauco Ortolano wrote a poem entitled Valley of the Dry Bones based on Ezekiel 37:

As Israel bid farewell to Babylon
In the Valley of Dry Bones
So should we
Overcome the sins and enticements
Of the world

Thus, when our time to return from the grave comes,
Let our bones reconnect with our figure
So we may be allowed to fight the last insurrection
As the fruits of the first resurrection

== Qur'anic parallel ==
In Al-Baqarah 2:243, Allah reveals that thousands of Israelites, who were in exile, went out from their homes in fear of death, presumably suffering from a plague or disease of some sort. He had eased their suffering, putting them to rest in a spot where their bones remained. Then, in proving his omnipotence and showing the people they had nothing to fear in this mortal realm, Allah reconstructed their bones, having brought them back to life.

Both classical and contemporary tafsirs have identified this verse as referring to the event mentioned in the Old Testament. The difference between the biblical and Qur'anic versions is that Dhu'l-Kifl (who Ezekiel's often been identified as) isn't explicitly present in the Qur'anic narrative, while Dhu'l-Kifl is described as being present in the biblical one. In addition, in the Book of Ezekiel the events are stated as just a vision, purely perceptual, while the events are described as actually having happened in the Qur'an.

== In popular culture ==
The Negro spiritual "Dem Bones", also known as "Dry Bones", was inspired by Ezekiel's vision of the Valley of Dry Bones. It was first recorded by The Famous Myers Jubilee Singers in 1928.

In the movie True Grit, the lead character Mattie Ross describes her night sleeping in a mortuary reminding her of the Valley of Dry Bones.

The 2020 song "Rattle!" by Elevation Worship is based on the story of the dry bones.

In the 2020 song "Persona Non Grata" by American indie band Bright Eyes, the lyrics state "Where the stained glass of crimson meets Ezekiel's visions. Saw a valley of bones where no man shall be saved."

The Super Mario franchise features a recurring enemy known in English releases as Dry Bones. The enemy is an animated Koopa Troopa skeleton which falls apart when stomped on, only to reform itself moments later, often while making a rattling sound.

== Literature ==
- Jeffrey, D.L., ed. (1992). "Dry Bones, Valley of". A Dictionary of Biblical Tradition in English Literature. W.B. Eerdmans. ISBN 978-0-8028-3634-2.
- Morris, Robert (1968). The Novels of Anthony Powell. University of Pittsburgh Press. pp. 218–230.
