= A Jolly Bad Fellow =

1964 British film by Don Chaffey

- Directed by: Don Chaffey
- Screenplay by: Robert Hamer; Donald Taylor
- Based on: Don Among the Dead Men; 1952 novel by C. E. Vulliamy
- Produced by: Donald Taylor
- Starring: Leo McKern
- Cinematography: Gerald Gibbs
- Edited by: Peter Tanner
- Music by: John Barry
- Production company: Pax Films
- Distributed by: British Lion Films
- Release date: 1964
- Running time: 94 minutes
- Country: United Kingdom
- Language: English

A Jolly Bad Fellow (U.S. title: They All Died Laughing; also known as Don Among the Dead Men) is a 1964 British black comedy film directed by Don Chaffey and starring Leo McKern and Janet Munro. It was written by Robert Hamer and Donald Taylor based on C.E. Vulliamy's 1952 novel Don among the Dead Men.

A university professor advances his career through habitually poisoning his colleagues at the university.

Filmink called it "an attempt by Michael Balcon to recapture the magic of Ealing" and gave a rare leading film role to Leo McKern.

== Plot ==
Kerris Bowles-Ottery is professor of science at the University of Ockham. To advance his career, he poisons inconvenient colleagues with an untraceable substance he has discovered that induces hysteria and manic behaviour followed by death. His research assistant, Delia, blackmails him into a promise of marriage, but he remains attached to his wife, and poisons Delia. When the police arrive at his home to question him, he flees in his car but fatally crashes it as a result of smoking a poisoned cigarette that his wife has unknowingly brought from his laboratory.

== Cast ==
- Leo McKern as Prof Bowles-Ottery
- Janet Munro as Delia Brooks
- Maxine Audley as Clarina Bowles-Ottery
- Duncan Macrae as Dr Brass
- Dennis Price as Prof Hughes
- Miles Malleson as Dr Woolley
- Mervyn Johns as Willie Pugh-Smith
- Mark Dignam as The Master
- Leonard Rossiter as Dr Fisher
- Alan Wheatley as epicene
- Patricia Jessel as Mrs Pugh-Smith
- Dinsdale Landen as Fred
- George Benson as Inspector Butts.
- Ralph Michael as Superintendent Rastleigh
- Jerome Willis as Detective Inspector Armstrong
- John Sharp as Hodges
- Wally Patch as Tom the publican
- Judith Furse as Lady Davidson

== Production ==
The film was based on C.E. Vulliamy's 1952 black comedy novel Don among the Dead Men, about an Oxford don who murders off rival colleagues. In 1962 it was announced film rights had been purchased by Michael Balcon, who assigned the job of writing the script to Andrew Sinclair, author of The Breaking of Bumbo. It was going to be made by Pax Films who had a deal with Bryanston and Brittania Films.

The script was eventually credited to Robert Hamer who had made Kind Hearts and Coronets. The film ended up being the first lead role for Leo McKern, who was usually a character actor. The movie was meant to be in the style of the Ealing comedies. Filming started June 1963 at Shepperton.

== Reception ==
The Evening Standard wrote "McKern is a jolly good actor and it's sad to see him done in by a jolly bad film... a promising idea for a black comedy. But here it's devoid of wit, finesse, style and ruthlessness."

"Not very entertaining," said The Observer.

Variety called it "the type of witty, offbeat comedy that used to be a favorite of the old Ealing Films setup... a lighthearted entry entertaining while it lasts. But this is unlikely to stick in patrons' memories."

The Monthly Film Bulletin wrote: "Its awkward, old-fashioned punning title is unfortunately typical of A Jolly Bad Fellow. A Sir Michael Balcon production, with the late Robert Hamer sharing the script credit and a host of familiar character actors in the cast, it naturally arouses hopes of a renewal of the Ealing comedy tradition. But that vein has been worked out and this is the second recent British film to demonstrate that you cannot really rejuvenate an outworn formula simply by throwing in a bit of social comment and a few snide references to television. Like Nothing But the Best, A Jolly Bad Fellow is full of echoes – Genevieve, Kind Hearts, Brief Encounter, even the early films of Ralph Richardson, whose mannerisms have been inherited by Leo McKern. But the echoes only remind one how much better these things were done twenty years ago. The idea of murder as a jolly jape was pretty dated even before The Ladykillers. In the present film it is also peculiarly tasteless because it is unnecessary – the plot does not depend on the death of any of the victims. Don Chaffey's direction manages to be both flat and fussy – the business with the poisoned cigarettes being worked literally and figuratively to death – and there is an irritatingly jaunty score for "jazz organ" which makes one think wistfully of Larry Adler."

Leslie Halliwell said: "Interesting but finally irritating comedy of murders with a punnish rather than a donnish script and only moments of genuine sub-Ealing hilarity."

In a 2017 study of Bryanston Films, Duncan Petrie writes that the film did not make "any impact either commercially or critically."

The New York Times called it "nonconformist but not especially sidesplitting" although having "a deftly casual air about it as well as the polish of professionalism".
