= Fair Stood the Wind for France =

1944 novel by H. E. Bates

- First US edition
- Author: H. E. Bates
- Cover artist: Nicholas Panesis
- Language: English
- Publisher: Michael Joseph (UK); Little Brown (US)
- Publication date: 1944
- Publication place: United Kingdom
- Media type: Print
- OCLC: 220638129
- Preceded by: How Sleep the Brave (1943)
- Followed by: The Cruise of the Breadwinner (1946)

Fair Stood the Wind for France is a novel written by English author H. E. Bates. The novel was published in 1944 and was Bates's first financial success. The title comes from the first line of "Agincourt", a poem by Michael Drayton (1563–1631).

== Plot introduction ==
The story concerns John Franklin, the pilot of a Wellington bomber, who badly injures his arm when he crash-lands the aircraft in German-occupied France during the Second World War. He and his crew make their way to an isolated farmhouse and are taken in by the family of a French farmer. Plans are made to smuggle them all back to Britain via Vichy-controlled Marseille but Franklin's condition worsens, his injured arm having been amputated, and he remains at the farm during the hot summer weeks that follow and falls in love with the farmer's daughter Françoise. Eventually they make the hazardous journey together by rowing boat, bicycle and train.

== Reception ==
Kirkus Reviews is positive: "A holding story - stark and sustaining interest -- less intricately plotted than some of the stories of escape, but with greater literary quality and emotional values...Bates is an accomplished stylist, he has an aesthetic awareness, a realization of the psychological casualties of war to make this more than external entertainment.

== Adaptations ==
The book was adapted into a 4-part television mini-series in 1980 for the BBC, starring David Beames as Franklin and Cécile Paoli as Françoise. This production is available on DVD, distributed by Acorn Media UK. A stage adaptation was produced at the Royal Theatre, Northampton in April and May 1986. It was written by Gregory Evans, directed by Michael Napier Brown and starred Katharine Schlesinger and Kim Wall. In January 1991 BBC Radio 4 transmitted a three-part Classic Serial also adapted by Gregory Evans and directed by David Benedictus. In November 2009, BBC Radio 4 broadcast a new two-part dramatisation by Maddy Fredericks in the Classic Serial strand.
