= Ezekiel 34 =

Book of Ezekiel, chapter 34

- ← chapter 33 chapter 35 →
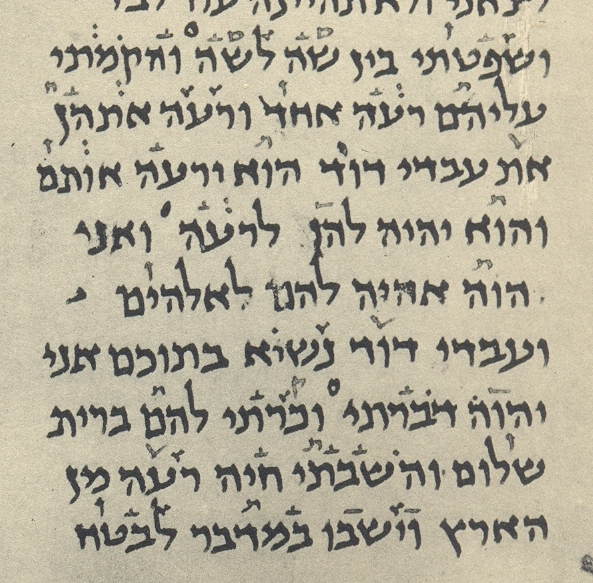
- The Hebrew text of Book of Ezekiel 34:23ff with Babylonia vocalization in a geniza fragment from Bodley Library, University of Oxford (shelfmark Ms. heb. d. 64).
- Book: Book of Ezekiel
- Hebrew Bible part: Nevi'im
- Order in the Hebrew part: 7
- Category: Latter Prophets
- Christian Bible part: Old Testament
- Order in the Christian part: 26

Ezekiel 34 is the thirty-fourth chapter of the Book of Ezekiel in the Hebrew Bible or the Old Testament of the Christian Bible. This book contains the prophecies attributed to the prophet/priest Ezekiel, and is one of the Books of the Prophets. In this chapter, Ezekiel prophesies against the "irresponsible shepherds" of Israel and states that God will instead seek out God's sheep and become their "true shepherd". The Jerusalem Bible notes the continuity of this theme, occurring in Jeremiah 23:1–6, here in Ezekiel, and later resumed in Zechariah 11:4–17, as well as in the New Testament.

== Text ==
The original text was written in the Hebrew language. This chapter is divided into 31 verses.

=== Textual witnesses ===
Some early manuscripts containing the text of this chapter in Hebrew are of the Masoretic Text tradition, which includes the Codex Cairensis (895), the Petersburg Codex of the Prophets (916), Aleppo Codex (10th century), Codex Leningradensis (1008).

There is also a translation into Koine Greek known as the Septuagint, made in the last few centuries BC. Extant ancient manuscripts of the Septuagint version include Codex Vaticanus (B; $\mathfrak{G}$^{B}; 4th century), Codex Alexandrinus (A; $\mathfrak{G}$^{A}; 5th century) and Codex Marchalianus (Q; $\mathfrak{G}$^{Q}; 6th century). (Note: Ezekiel is missing from the extant Codex Sinaiticus.)

== Verse 2 ==
"Son of man, prophesy against the shepherds of Israel, prophesy and say to them,
Thus says the Lord God to the shepherds:

"Woe to the shepherds of Israel who feed themselves!
Should not the shepherds feed the flocks?" (NKJV)

- "Son of man" (Hebrew: בן־אדם ḇen-’ā-ḏām): this phrase is used 93 times to address Ezekiel.
- "Shepherd" (Hebrew: רועי or רעי rō-w-‘ê): the noun is derived from the Hebrew verb רָעָה ra'ah (Assyrian rê°û, verb: "pasture", noun: "ruler") meaning to "pasture, tend, graze", to "feed (the flock)"; figuratively "to guard, care for, rule." A "common allegory" referring to the rulers of Israel, either political or spiritual.

== Verse 3 ==
You eat the fat and clothe yourselves with the wool; you slaughter the fatlings, but you do not feed the flock.

"You eat the milk" in the Septuagint - the consonants are the same.

== Verse 5 ==
So they were scattered because there was no shepherd;

and they became food for all the beasts of the field when they were scattered. (NKJV)

Cross reference: Numbers 27:17; 1 Kings 22:17; 2 Chronicles 18:16; Isaiah 13:14; Jeremiah 50:6; Zechariah 10:2; Matthew 9:36; Mark 6:34; Acts 20:29

== Verse 6 ==
"My sheep wandered through all the mountains, and on every high hill; yes, My flock was scattered over the whole face of the earth, and no one was seeking or searching for them."

The final words, "for them", are added in most English translations, as they are not in the original text. Robert Young's Literal Translation ends "and there is none inquiring, and none seeking". The sheep are scattered, "first on to 'every high hill' as idolaters, and then 'over the face of the earth' in exile".

== Verse 16 ==
“I will seek what was lost and bring back what was driven away, bind up the broken and strengthen what was sick; but I will destroy the fat and the strong, and feed them in judgment.”

This verse "clearly anticipates a return from exile to the land of Israel".

== Verse 23 ==
I will establish one shepherd over them, and he shall feed them — My servant David.
He shall feed them and be their shepherd. (NKJV)

Cross reference: 2 Samuel 5:2; 2 Samuel 7:8; 1 Chronicles 11:2; Psalm 78:71; Isaiah 40:11; Jeremiah 3:15; John 10:1–16; John 21:15–17; 1 Peter 5:2–4; Acts 20:28

== Verse 25 ==
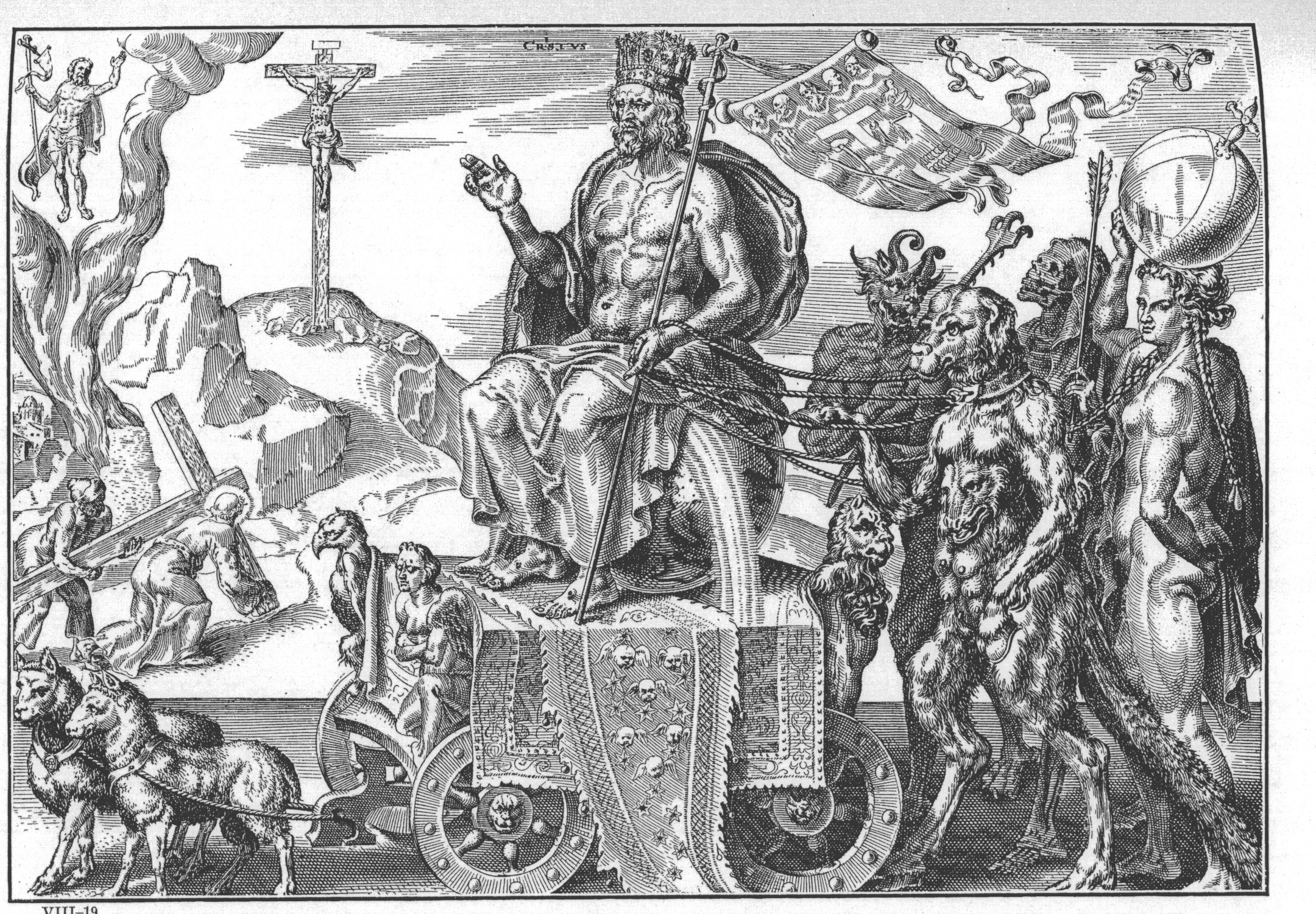
Artwork describing Ezekiel 34:25 by an unknown Italian artist; illustration of The Bible and its Story Taught by One Thousand Picture Lessons, edited by Charles F. Horne and Julius A. Bewer, published by Francis R. Niglutsch, New York, in 1908. vol. 8.

“I will make a covenant of peace with them, and cause wild beasts to cease from the land; and they will dwell safely in the wilderness and sleep in the woods.” (NKJV)

Cross reference: Leviticus 26:6; Hosea 2:20; Jeremiah 31:31

== Verse 31 ==
“You are My flock, the flock of My pasture;
you are men, and I am your God,”

says the Lord God. (NKJV)

== See also ==
- David
- Israel
- Related Bible parts: 1 Samuel 5, 1 Samuel 7, Psalm 23, Psalm 78, Psalm 89, Isaiah 40, Jeremiah 31, Matthew 23, Matthew 25, Luke 15, John 10, John 21, Hebrews 8

== Bibliography ==
- Bromiley, Geoffrey W. (1995). International Standard Bible Encyclopedia: vol. iv, Q-Z. Eerdmans. ISBN 9780802837844.
- Brown, Francis; Briggs, Charles A.; Driver, S. R. (1994). The Brown-Driver-Briggs Hebrew and English Lexicon (reprint ed.). Hendrickson Publishers. ISBN 978-1565632066.
- Clements, Ronald E (1996). Ezekiel. Westminster John Knox Press. ISBN 9780664252724.
- Gesenius, H. W. F. (1979). Gesenius' Hebrew and Chaldee Lexicon to the Old Testament Scriptures: Numerically Coded to Strong's Exhaustive Concordance, with an English Index. Translated by Tregelles, Samuel Prideaux (7th ed.). Baker Book House.
- Joyce, Paul M. (2009). Ezekiel: A Commentary. Continuum. ISBN 9780567483614.
- Würthwein, Ernst (1995). The Text of the Old Testament. Translated by Rhodes, Erroll F. Grand Rapids, MI: Wm. B. Eerdmans. ISBN 0-8028-0788-7.
