= Ezekiel 36 =

Book of Ezekiel, chapter 36

- ← chapter 35 chapter 37 →
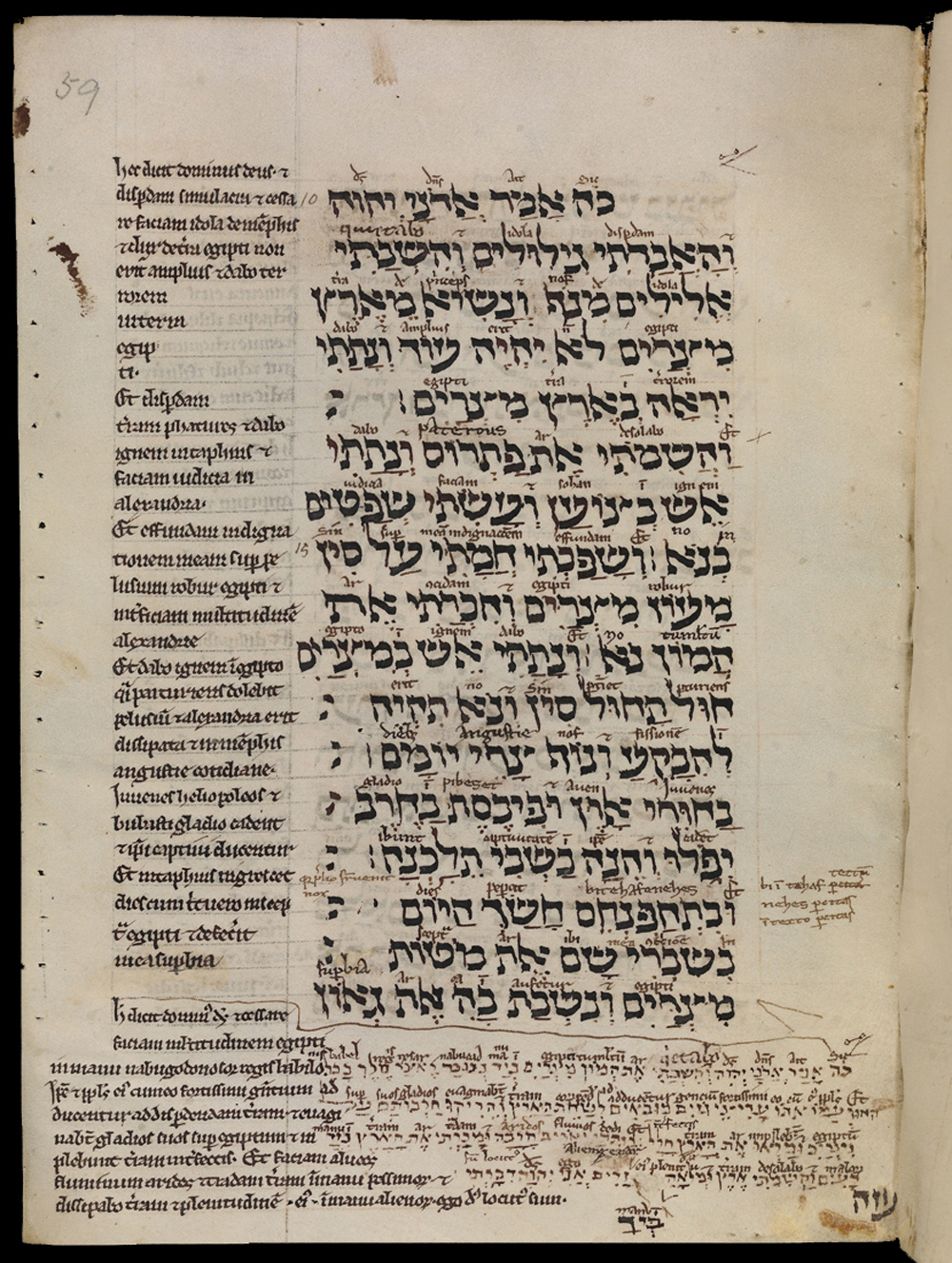
- Book of Ezekiel 30:13–18 in an English manuscript from the early 13th century, MS. Bodl. Or. 62, fol. 59a. A Latin translation appears in the margins with further interlineations above the Hebrew.
- Book: Book of Ezekiel
- Hebrew Bible part: Nevi'im
- Order in the Hebrew part: 7
- Category: Latter Prophets
- Christian Bible part: Old Testament
- Order in the Christian part: 26

Ezekiel 36 is the thirty-sixth chapter of the Book of Ezekiel in the Hebrew Bible or the Old Testament of the Christian Bible. This book contains the prophecies attributed to the prophet/priest Ezekiel, and is one of the Books of the Prophets. This chapter contains two prophecies, one conveying "hope for the mountains of Israel" (verses 1–15) and one declaring that Israel's restoration is assured (verses 16–38). Biblical commentator Susan Galambush pairs the first of these with an oracle condemning Mount Seir in Edom in the previous chapter.

== Text ==
The original text was written in the Hebrew language. This chapter is divided into 38 verses.

=== Textual witnesses ===
Some early manuscripts containing the text of this chapter in Hebrew are of the Masoretic Text tradition, which includes the Codex Cairensis (895), the Petersburg Codex of the Prophets (916), Aleppo Codex (10th century), and Codex Leningradensis (1008). Fragments containing parts of this chapter were found among the Dead Sea Scrolls, that is, the Ezekiel Scroll from Masada (Mas 1d; MasEzek; 1–50 CE) with extant verses 1–10, 13–14, 17–35.

There is also a translation into Koine Greek known as the Septuagint, made in the last few centuries BCE. Extant ancient manuscripts of the Septuagint version include Codex Vaticanus (B; $\mathfrak{G}$^{B}; 4th century), Codex Alexandrinus (A; $\mathfrak{G}$^{A}; 5th century) and Codex Marchalianus (Q; $\mathfrak{G}$^{Q}; 6th century). (Note: Ezekiel is missing from the extant Codex Sinaiticus.)

== Verse 1 ==
"And you, son of man, prophesy to the mountains of Israel, and say,

‘O mountains of Israel, hear the word of the Lord!’" (NKJV)

- "Son of man" (Hebrew: בן־אדם ḇen-’ā-ḏām): this phrase is used 93 times to address Ezekiel.
- "Mountains of Israel" (Hebrew: הרי ישראל hā-rê yiś-rā-’êl): refers to "the land of Israel", called "the ancient heights" (verse 2) as the highlands and the hill country are central to its geography.

== Verse 2 ==
Thus says the Lord God: “Because the enemy has said of you,

‘Aha! The ancient heights have become our possession,’” (NKJV)

- "Aha" (Hebrew: הֶאָ֔ח, he-’āḥ): an interjection to express joy or "satisfaction over the misfortune of an enemy or rival" as in Isaiah 44:16; Psalm 35:21, 25; Psalm 40:16 and Ezekiel 25:3.

== See also ==
- Edom
- Israel
- Jerusalem
- Related Bible parts: Jeremiah 31, Romans 11

== Bibliography ==
- Bromiley, Geoffrey W. (1995). International Standard Bible Encyclopedia: vol. iv, Q-Z. Eerdmans. ISBN 9780802837844.
- Brown, Francis; Briggs, Charles A.; Driver, S. R. (1994). The Brown-Driver-Briggs Hebrew and English Lexicon (reprint ed.). Hendrickson Publishers. ISBN 978-1565632066.
- Clements, Ronald E (1996). Ezekiel. Westminster John Knox Press. ISBN 9780664252724.
- Gesenius, H. W. F. (1979). Gesenius' Hebrew and Chaldee Lexicon to the Old Testament Scriptures: Numerically Coded to Strong's Exhaustive Concordance, with an English Index. Translated by Tregelles, Samuel Prideaux (7th ed.). Baker Book House.
- Joyce, Paul M. (2009). Ezekiel: A Commentary. Continuum. ISBN 9780567483614.
- The Nelson Study Bible. Thomas Nelson, Inc. 1997. ISBN 9780840715999.
- Würthwein, Ernst (1995). The Text of the Old Testament. Translated by Rhodes, Erroll F. Grand Rapids, MI: Wm. B. Eerdmans. ISBN 0-8028-0788-7.
