= The Kindly Ones (Powell novel) =

Novel by Anthony Powell

- First edition
- Author: Anthony Powell
- Cover artist: James Broom-Lynne
- Language: English
- Series: A Dance to the Music of Time
- Publisher: Heinemann
- Publication date: 1962
- Publication place: United Kingdom
- Media type: Print (Hardcover)
- Pages: 254 pp
- Preceded by: Casanova's Chinese Restaurant
- Followed by: The Valley of Bones

The Kindly Ones (published in 1962) is a novel by Anthony Powell that forms the sixth in his twelve-volume sequence A Dance to the Music of Time. The book's title relates to the placatory name given to the Furies of Greek mythology and chiefly addresses the period just before and after Britain enters World War II. The book is dedicated "For R.W.K.C.", the biographer and historian R. W. Ketton-Cremer.

== Plot ==
The novel is divided into four episodes, of which the first takes place at Stonehurst during the boyhood of Nick Jenkins on the eve of World War I. This introduces some of the figures encountered in earlier instalments of the sequence. They include the retired General Conyers, who tactfully handles the nude appearance among them of a parlour maid unhinged by jealousy at the news that the family servant Albert is going to get married. As the General is leaving Stonehurst after lunch there is the chance conjunction with him in the road of the eccentric cultist Dr. Trelawney and Nick's Uncle Giles.

The story then returns to the time sequence of the novel series, with another lunch at the second episode's centre. Nick and his wife Isobel are staying with his composer friend Moreland and are included in the invitation to a meal with Sir Magnus Donners at Stourwater Castle. They are driven there by Nick's old school friend Peter Templer, whom he has not seen for a long while. Sir Magnus has recently taken up photography and the party agrees to portray for him the seven deadly sins depicted on the drawing room tapestries. This culminates in the mental breakdown of Templer's second wife, again by reason of sexual jealousy. Just then Kenneth Widmerpool calls on business and is persuaded to drive the visitors home.

Following his uncle's death, Nick journeys down to arrange for his cremation and stays overnight at the Bellevue, the dingy seaside hotel now kept by Albert in which Uncle Giles had been living. Also staying there is Bob Duport, the former husband of Peter Templer's sister Jean, with whom Nick had had a secret affair years before. Duport has been the victim of Widmerpool's business ruthlessness and is hiding from his creditors. When he and Nick return from an evening's drinking, they have to rescue Dr. Trelawney, yet another of the Bellevue residents, from the bathroom in which he has trapped himself. Afterwards he prophesies that "the sword of Mithras…will ere long flash from its scabbard", when once more "the Angel of Death will ride the storm".

On the day of Nick's return, news breaks that the Molotov–Ribbentrop Pact had been signed. Once World War 2 begins, Nick, who is in his thirties, tries to find a regiment which will take him as an officer. He makes unsuccessful approaches to General Conyers, and to Widmerpool, already a reserve officer in the Territorial Army. While calling on his relation by marriage, Lady Molly, he encounters the now homeless Moreland whose wife Matilda, a former mistress of Sir Magnus Donners, has returned to and is now about to marry Sir Magnus. Also staying in the house and processing the papers of Reservists is Stanley Jeavons, the brother of Lady Molly's husband, who agrees to speed through Nick's call-up.
