= Colwyn Edward Vulliamy =

Anglo-Welsh biographer and author (1886–1971)

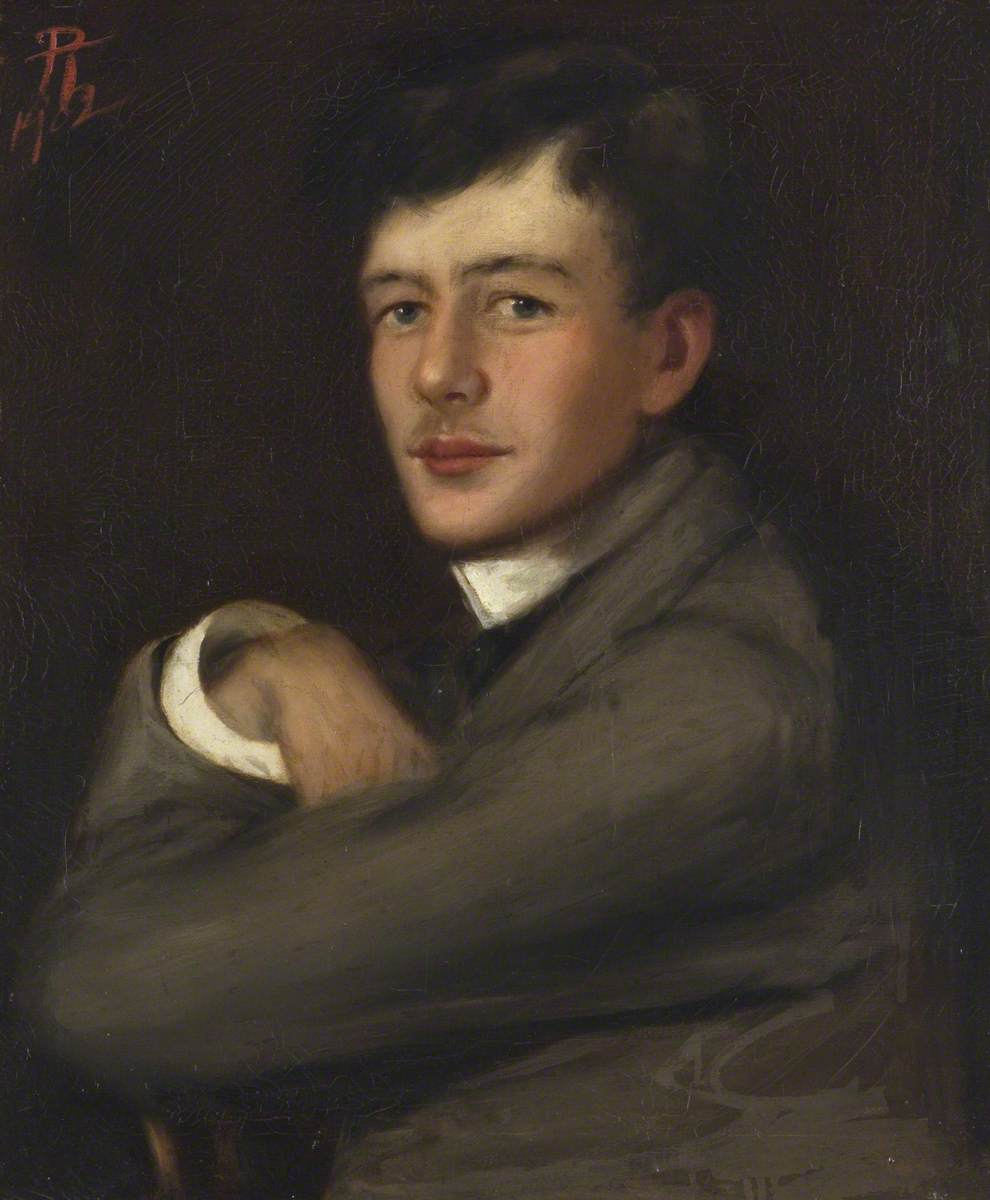

Colwyn Edward Vulliamy (20 June 1886 – 4 September 1971) was an Anglo-Welsh biographer and author. He was mostly credited as C. E. Vulliamy, but he sometimes used the pen name Anthony Rolls for his crime fiction.

Born in Glasbury, Radnorshire, into a landed branch of the Vulliamy family, Vulliamy was the son of Edwyn Papendiek Vulliamy and Edith Jane Beaven.

His James Boswell (1933) has been called “the cruellest and most damaging portrait of his subject that has ever been composed”. Vulliamy's Ursa Major: A Study of Dr Johnson and His Friends (1946) was chosen as a book of the month by the Right Book Club in 1948.

Apart from his more serious work as a biographer, historian and archaeologist, Vulliamy also wrote detective fiction. His novel Don Among the Dead Men (1952) was filmed as A Jolly Bad Fellow, a black comedy starring Leo McKern.

Vulliamy married Eileen Muriel Hynes (1886–1943), and they had two children, Patricia Drift Vulliamy (1917–1987), and John Sebastian Papendiek Vulliamy (1919–2007), an architect who was the father of the journalist Ed Vulliamy.

== Publications as C. E. Vulliamy ==
- Charles Kingsley and Christian Socialism (1914)
- Our Prehistoric Forerunners (London: The Bodley Head, 1925)
- Unknown Cornwall (1925)
- The White Bull (Scholartis, 1929), translations from Voltaire
- The Letters of the Tsar to the Tsaritsa, 1914–1917 (translated by A. L. Hynes). (London: The Bodley Head; New York: Dodd, Mead & Company, 1929)
- Voltaire (London: Geoffrey Bles; New York: Dodd, Mead & Company, 1930)
- The Archaeology of Middlesex and London (1930)
- John Wesley (1931)
- Rousseau (1931)
- The Vicar's Experiments (1932)
- James Boswell (1932)
- William Penn (1933)
- Judas Maccabaeus: A Study Based upon Dr Quarto Karadyne's Translation of the Ararat Codex (London: Geoffrey Bles, 1934)
- Mrs Thrale of Streatham (1936)
- Royal George: A Study of King George III (1937)
- Outlanders: A Study of Imperial Expansion in South Africa, 1877–1902 (London: Jonathan Cape, 1938)
- Crimea (1939)
- Calico Pie (1940)
- A Short History of the Montagu-Puffins (1941)
- Doctor Philligo (1944)
- English Letter Writers (Collins, 1945) from the "Britain in Pictures" series
- Edwin and Eleanor: a Pastoral of Pioneer Life (1945)
- Ursa Major: A Study of Dr Johnson and His Friends (London: Michael Joseph, 1946; Right Book Club, 1948)
- Byron: With a View of the Kingdom of Cant and a Dissection of the Byronic Ego (1948)
- Prodwit's Guide to Writing (1949)
- Henry Plumdew: His Memoirs, Experiences, and Opinions, 1938–1948, ed. C. E. Vulliamy (London: Michael Joseph, 1950)
- The Anatomy of Satire (1950)
- Rocking Horse Journey: Some Views of the British character (London: Michael Joseph, 1952)
- Don Among the Dead Men (London: Michael Joseph, 1952)
- The Onslow Family, 1528–1874 (1953)
- Little Arthur's Guide to Humbug (1960)
- Tea at the Abbey (1961)

== Publications as Anthony Rolls ==
- The Vicar’s Experiments (Geoffrey Bles, 1932)
- Family Matters (Geoffrey Bles, 1933)
- Scarweather (Geoffrey Bles, 1934)
