= Mary Kelly (writer) =

English writer (1927–2017)

Mary Kelly

Mary Theresa Kelly, née Coolican (28 December 1927 – 2017), was an English writer of crime novels. Born in London, she received an M.A. degree from University of Edinburgh in 1951. She married Dennis Charles Kelly in 1950, and was a teacher in Surrey County Council schools. In 1961, her novel The Spoilt Kill won a Gold Dagger Award.

== Bibliography ==
=== Inspector Brett Nightingale series ===
- A Cold Coming (1956)
- Dead Man's Riddle (1957)
- The Christmas Egg (1958)

=== Other novels ===
- The Spoilt Kill (1961)
- Due to a Death (1962; USA: The Dead of Summer)
- March to the Gallows (1964)
- The Dead Corse (1966)
- Write on Both Sides of the Paper (1969)
- The Twenty-Fifth Hour (1971)
- That Girl in the Alley (1974)
