= Adam Diment =

British novelist (born 1943)

Frederick Adam Diment (born 1943) is a spy novelist who published four novels between 1967 and 1971. All four are about the adventures of Philip McAlpine whom critic Anthony Boucher described as "an agent who smokes hashish, leads a highly active sex life, kills vividly, uses (or even coins) the latest London slang and still seems a perfectly real (and even oddly likeable) young man rather than a reflected Bond image."

A film version of The Dolly Dolly Spy with David Hemmings playing McAlpine was scheduled to go into production but was never made.

Diment disappeared from public view after his last novel, adding to his cult figure status among fans of 1960s spy novels. According to The Observer, by 1975 Diment was living in Zurich, shunning publicity, and had no plans to write further novels. In 2017 The Guardian reported that the now-bankrupt publisher Unbound was attempting to re-issue his books via a crowdfunding scheme.

== Novels ==
- The Dolly Dolly Spy (1967)
- The Great Spy Race (1968)
- The Bang Bang Birds (1968)
- Think, Inc (1971)
