= The Soldier's Art =

Eighth novel in Anthony Powell's twelve-volume A Dance to the Music of Time,

- Author: Anthony Powell
- Cover artist: James Broom-Lynne
- Series: A Dance to the Music of Time
- Publisher: Heinemann
- Publication date: 1966
- Publication place: United Kingdom
- Preceded by: The Valley of Bones
- Followed by: The Military Philosophers

The Soldier's Art is the eighth novel in Anthony Powell's twelve-volume masterpiece A Dance to the Music of Time, and the second in the war trilogy. The title is from the poem by Robert Browning, Childe Roland to the Dark Tower Came, fifth line: “think first, fight afterwards – the soldier’s art.”

The Soldier's Art has been described as among the best novels about the British experience in the Second World War.

The Soldier’s Art opens in 1941. Nick Jenkins’s Division is still in Northern Ireland. General Liddament takes an interest in Jenkins and arranges for him to see a Major Finn in London for a new post with the Free French, but Jenkins's French is not good enough. Jenkins returns to Divisional Headquarters.

In F Mess Charles Stringham is now a waiter. He and Jenkins speak in private about Robert Tolland’s death.

At the Divisional Headquarters Widmerpool, a major and the DAAG, learns he will be leaving the Division but will do nothing to help Jenkins find a post. Jenkins receives orders to London.

It was published in 1966, and touches on themes of separation and unanticipated loss. It is dedicated to Powell's friend, the writer, Roy Fuller.
