= Kathleen Freeman (classicist) =

British writer and scholar (1897–1959)

- Kathleen Freeman
- Born: 22 June 1897; Yardley, Birmingham, England
- Died: 21 February 1959 (aged 61); St Mellons, Wales

Academic background
- Education: Cardiff University (as University College of South Wales and Monmouthshire)

Academic work
- Discipline: Ancient Greek philosophy
- Institutions: Cardiff University (as University College of South Wales and Monmouthshire), Philosophical Society of England

Kathleen Freeman (22 June 1897 – 21 February 1959) was a British classical scholar and author of detective novels. Her detective fiction was published under the pseudonym Mary Fitt. Freeman was a lecturer in Greek at the University College of South Wales and Monmouthshire, Cardiff, between 1919 and 1946.

== Early life and education ==
Kathleen Freeman was born in Yardley, Birmingham, and was the daughter of a commercial traveller, Charles H. Freeman, and Catharine Freeman, née Mawdesley. By the 1911 census, the family had moved to an eight-room house at 86 Conway Road, Cardiff. Freeman's mother died in 1919, and her father died in 1932. Freeman attended Canton High School on Market Road in Cardiff, which opened in 1907. Boys and girls were both educated in the school but separately in different subjects: Canton High School offered Latin but not to girls, and Freeman's schooling did not include Greek or Latin.

In a field dominated by men, she was an unlikely candidate to become a classicist of note. No details have been found about when or with whom she started to learn ancient Greek. Freeman knew Latin, French, German, Italian, and ancient and modern Greek. Except for French, which was taught at Canton High School, it remains unclear how she learnt these languages.

Freeman won a scholarship to study at the University College of South Wales and Monmouthshire, Cardiff, which began to accept male and female students in 1893. She began her degree in 1915 and studied with Professor Gilbert Norwood.

== Academic career ==
Following her graduation in 1918 when she was awarded a BA, Freeman remained at University College and was appointed Lecturer in Greek in 1919. She went on to earn an MA in 1922 and a DLitt in 1940. A 1922 picture of the faculty at University College shows 41 men and 10 women. Only one of these women, Ida Beata Saxby, had a doctorate (University of London, 1918).

Freeman is best known for her works The Pre-Socratic Philosophers: A Companion to Diels, Fragmente Der Vorsokratiker (1946), and Ancilla to the Pre-Socratic Philosophers (1947/48), a translation of and handbook to the fragments of Pre-Socratic philosophers collected by Diels.

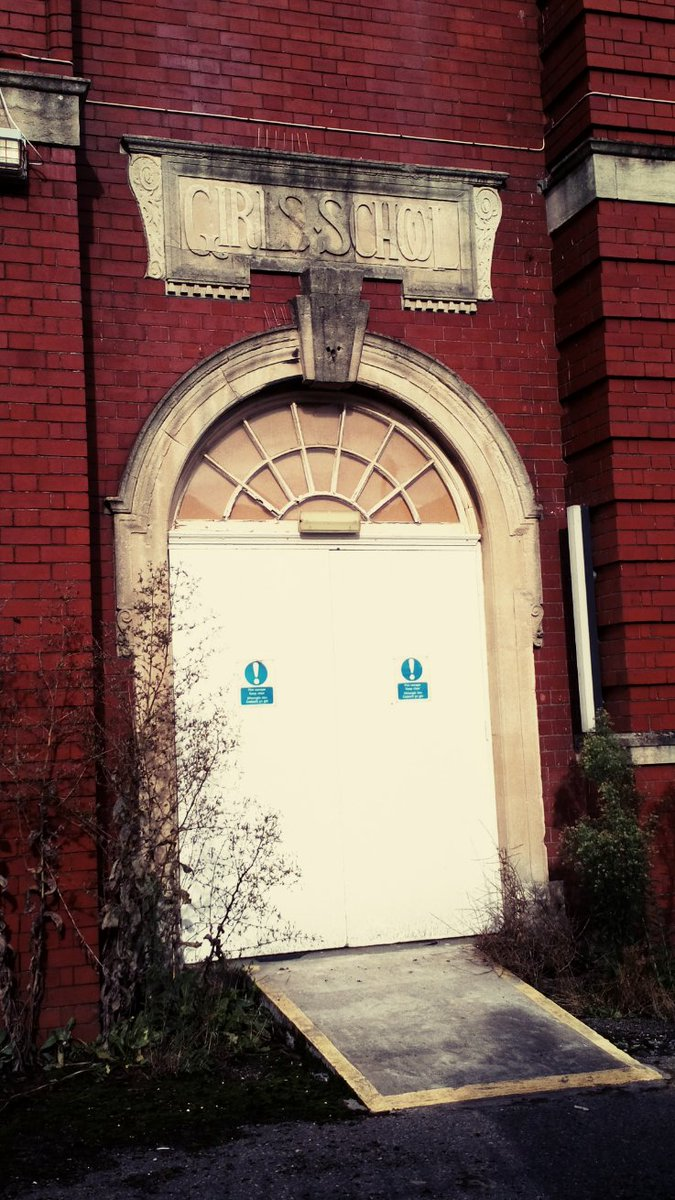
Girls' entrance, Canton High School, Market Road, Cardiff

From early in her career, Freeman worked to bring Greek texts to the general public through her work in translating texts and presenting her ideas to general audiences. Freeman featured on BBC radio in 1926 presenting a series on 'Writers of Greece', including Greek authors such as Aristophanes, Thucydides and Empedocles.

During the Second World War Freeman delivered lectures on Greece for the Ministry of Information and in the National Scheme of Education for HM Forces in South Wales and Monmouthshire. She further contributed to the war effort with her selections of translations from Greek authors which featured in The Western Mail, a Cardiff-based newspaper. These were later published as the book, It Has All Happened Before: What the Greeks Thought of their Nazis (1941). Her publications Voices of Freedom (1943), What They Said at the Time: A Survey of the Causes of the Second World War (1945) and her work with the Philosophical Society of England, where she acted as Supervisor of Studies from 1948 to 1952 before becoming the Chairman in 1952, are further testimony to her desire to make Greek ideas accessible through translation. Freeman resigned from the university in 1946 in order to pursue her research and writing.

== Fiction-writing career ==
Freeman enjoyed success as a writer of fiction and wrote under the pseudonyms Mary Fitt (1936–60), Stuart Mary Wick (1948; 1950), Clare St. Donat (1950) and Caroline Cory (1956).

In 1926, in addition to her study The Work and Life of Solon, Freeman published a collection of short stories The Intruder and Other Stories, and her first novel Martin Hanner. A Comedy. In 1936, she began publishing crime fiction under the pseudonym Mary Fitt, writing 27 books and a number of short stories. In 1950, she became a member of the Detection Club. Her books were critically acclaimed at the time, although since her death many have been out of print. She also wrote twelve children's stories and T'other Miss Austen (1956), a study of Jane Austen.

In recent years, Freeman's work has been re-assessed, especially in the light of Welsh women and modernism. Her short stories have also been described as antecedents of the Kate North's queer stories, and, as of 2019, republication of some of her short stories was planned.

== Personal life ==
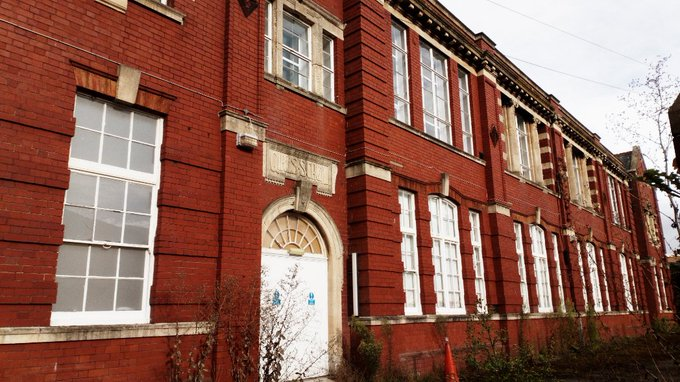
Formerly Canton High School, now Chapter Arts Centre, Market Road, Cardiff

From some time in the 1930s until her death, she lived with her girlfriend, Dr. Liliane Marie Catherine Clopet (1901–1987), a GP and author, at Lark's Rise, a house on Druidstone Road in St Mellons, now a district of Cardiff.

Freeman dedicated all her novels (written as Freeman, rather than Fitt) to Clopet from This Love (1929) onwards. The presentation copy of The Work and Life of Solon has survived, which Freeman dedicated to Clopet, dated to 14 July 1926. Freeman's inscription includes a slight misspelling of Clopet's name, which has been thought by antiquarian bookseller Peter Harrington, to indicate that Freeman and Clopet were in the early stages of their relationship. Freeman died in 1959 in St. Mellons at the age of 61. Clopet considerably outlived Freeman, dying in 1987 in Newport.

== Bibliography ==
=== Academic publications ===
- 1926: The Work and Life of Solon, with a translation of his poems, Cardiff: University of Wales Press Board. OCLC 756460254
- 1941: It Has All Happened Before: What the Greeks Thought of their Nazis, London: F. Muller Ltd. OCLC 5290960
- 1943: Voices of Freedom, London: F. Muller Ltd. OCLC 912104035
- 1945: What They Said at the Time: A Survey of the Causes of the Second World War, London: F. Muller Ltd. OCLC 921002880
- 1946: The Pre-Socratic Philosophers; a companion to Diels, Fragmente der Vorsokratiker, Oxford: Blackwell. OCLC 54961908
- 1946: The Murder of Herodes and Other Trials from the Athenian law courts, London, MacDonald. OCLC 607833964
- 1947: The Greek way: an Anthology. Translations from verse and prose, London, MacDonald. OCLC 577963906
- 1947/48: Ancilla to the pre-Socratic philosophers: a complete translation of the fragments in Diels, Fragmente der Vorsokratiker, Oxford and Cambridge, Mass., Blackwell and Harvard University Press. OCLC 706866300
- 1948: The Philoctetes of Sophocles, a modern version, London: Muller. OCLC 10111365
- 1950: Greek city-states, London, Macdonald; New York: W. W. Norton. OCLC 654595269
- 1952: God, Man and State. Greek concepts, London: Macdonald. OCLC 307525
- 1954: The Paths of Justice, London: Lutterworth Press. OCLC 602389093
- 1954: Everyday things in Ancient Greece, London, Batsford. A one-volume revision of Everyday Things in Homeric Greece, Everyday Things in Archaic Greece, and Everyday Things in Classical Greece by C. H. Quennell and Marjorie Quennell. 1929–32. OCLC 401803
- 1954: The Sophists. Translation of Mario Untersteiner, I sofisti, Oxford: Blackwell. OCLC 504343285

=== Selected fictional publications ===
- 1926: The Intruder and Other Stories, London: Jonathan Cape. OCLC 560414633
- 1926: Martin Hanner. A Comedy, New York: Harcourt, Brace and Co. OCLC 560414667
- 1936: Three Sisters Flew Home, London: Nicholson & Watson. OCLC 560845582
- 1937: The Three Hunting Horns, London: Nicholson & Watson. OCLC 752858530
- 1938: Expected Death, London: Nicholson & Watson. OCLC 8717293
- 1941: Death on Herons' Mere, London: Michael Joseph. OCLC 560844590
- 1941: Aftermath of Murder, New York: Doubleday. OCLC 13960788
- 1946: Death and the Pleasant Voices, London: Michael Joseph. OCLC 25115981
- 1948: And Where's Mr Bellamy?, London: Hutchinson. OCLC 16298203
- 1941: Death and Mary Dazill, London: Michael Joseph. OCLC 11233504
- 1950: Pity for Pamela, London: Macdonald & Co. OCLC 25115985
- 1952: Clues to Christabel, London: Pan Books. OCLC 155919411
- 1953: The Night-Watchman's Friend London: Macdonald & Co.
- 1959: Mizmaze, London: Michael Joseph. OCLC 16252800
