= Ezekiel 37 =

Book of Ezekiel, chapter 37

- ← chapter 36 chapter 38 →
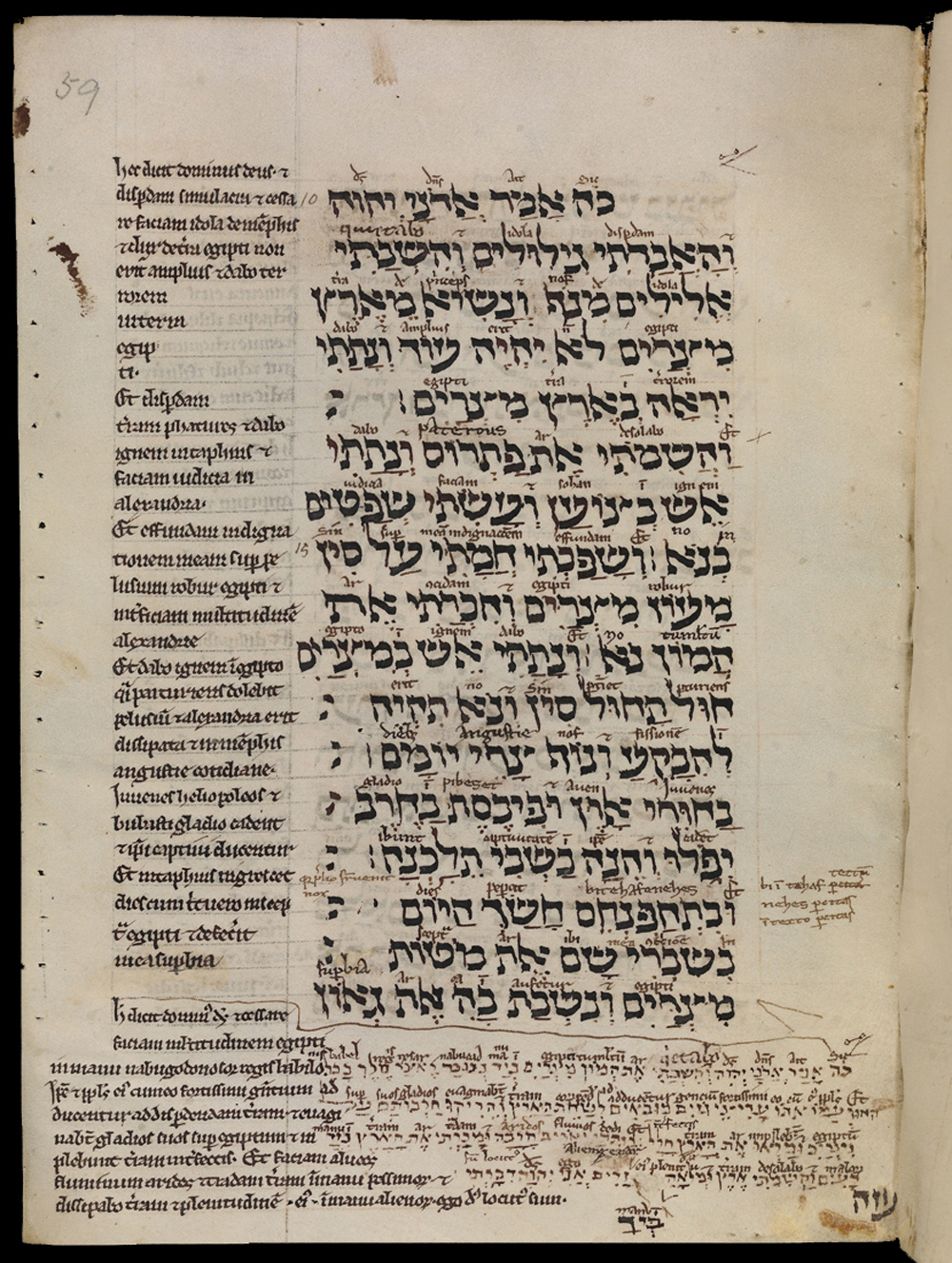
- Book of Ezekiel 30:13–18 in an English manuscript from early 13th century, MS. Bodl. Or. 62, fol. 59a. A Latin translation appears in the margins with further interlineations above the Hebrew.
- Book: Book of Ezekiel
- Hebrew Bible part: Nevi'im
- Order in the Hebrew part: 7
- Category: Latter Prophets
- Christian Bible part: Old Testament
- Order in the Christian part: 26

Ezekiel 37 is the thirty-seventh chapter of the Book of Ezekiel in the Hebrew Bible or the Old Testament of the Christian Bible. This book contains the prophecies attributed to the prophet/priest Ezekiel, and is one of the Nevi'im (Prophets). This chapter contains a vision of the resurrection of dry bones, widely known as the Vision of the Valley of Dry Bones, in which Ezekiel at last assures the captives in Babylon that they will return from exile.

== Text ==
The original text was written in the Hebrew language. This chapter is divided into 28 verses.

=== Textual witnesses ===
Some early manuscripts containing the text of this chapter in Hebrew are of the Masoretic Text tradition, which includes the Codex Cairensis (895), the Petersburg Codex of the Prophets (916), Aleppo Codex (10th century), and Codex Leningradensis (1008). Fragments containing parts of this chapter were found among the Dead Sea Scrolls, that is, the Ezekiel Scroll from Masada (Mas 1d; MasEzek; 1–50 CE) with extant verses 1–14, 16, 23, 28. Another witness is the Pseudo-Ezekiel.

There is also a translation into Koine Greek known as the Septuagint, made in the last few centuries BCE. Extant ancient manuscripts of the Septuagint version include Codex Vaticanus (B; $\mathfrak{G}$^{B}; 4th century), Codex Alexandrinus (A; $\mathfrak{G}$^{A}; 5th century) and Codex Marchalianus (Q; $\mathfrak{G}$^{Q}; 6th century). (Note: Ezekiel is missing from the extant Codex Sinaiticus.)

== Structure ==
The New King James Version groups this chapter into two sections:

- Ezekiel 37:1–14 = The Dry Bones Live
- Ezekiel 37:15–28 = One Kingdom, One King

== Verse 9 ==
Then said He unto me: 'Prophesy unto the breath, prophesy, son of man, and say to the breath: {S} Thus saith the Lord GOD: Come from the four winds, O breath, and breathe upon these slain, that they may live.'

- "Son of man" (Hebrew: בן־אדם): this phrase is used 93 times to address Ezekiel.
- "Breath" (Hebrew: רוח rū-akh): in this sense, "breath of life", can also translated to "wind", "spirit", or "animus."

== Verse 16-17 ==
'And thou, son of man, take thee one stick, and write upon it: For Judah, and for the children of Israel his companions; then take another stick, and write upon it: For Joseph, the stick of Ephraim, and of all the house of Israel his companions; and join them for thee one to another into one stick, that they may become one in thy hand.'

Pope John Paul II uses this "simple sign" from Ezekiel as an image of both "missionary and ecumenical endeavour" in his 1995 encyclical letter Ut Unum Sint: On commitment to Ecumenism.

Within the Church of Jesus Christ of Latter-day Saints this is understood to be a reference to the Book of Mormon (Stick of Joseph) and the Bible (Stick of Judah) coming together and working as one.

== Verse 24 ==
David My servant shall be king over them, and they shall all have one shepherd;
they shall also walk in My judgments and observe My statutes, and do them.

This verse refers a person coming from the House of David as "the servant of God", one shepherd of Israel, who will rule over the House of Judah (verse 16) and over the Tribe of Joseph (verse 17), so that he will "make them one stick, and they shall be one in mine hand" (verse 19), in a single nation of Israel.

== See also ==
- David
- Ephraim
- Israel
- Jacob
- Joseph
- Judah
- Old Testament messianic prophecies quoted in the New Testament
- Related Bible parts: Genesis 2, 2 Samuel 7, John 1, John 2

== Bibliography ==
- Blenkinsopp, Joseph. "A history of prophecy in Israel" (Westminster John Knox Press, 1996)
- Bromiley, Geoffrey W. (1995). International Standard Bible Encyclopedia: vol. iv, Q-Z. Eerdmans. ISBN 9780802837844.
- Brown, Francis; Briggs, Charles A.; Driver, S. R. (1994). The Brown-Driver-Briggs Hebrew and English Lexicon (reprint ed.). Hendrickson Publishers. ISBN 978-1565632066.
- Clements, Ronald E (1996). Ezekiel. Westminster John Knox Press. ISBN 9780664252724.
- Gesenius, H. W. F. (1979). Gesenius' Hebrew and Chaldee Lexicon to the Old Testament Scriptures: Numerically Coded to Strong's Exhaustive Concordance, with an English Index. Translated by Tregelles, Samuel Prideaux (7th ed.). Baker Book House.
- Joyce, Paul M. (2009). Ezekiel: A Commentary. Continuum. ISBN 9780567483614.
- The Nelson Study Bible. Thomas Nelson, Inc. 1997. ISBN 9780840715999.
- Würthwein, Ernst (1995). The Text of the Old Testament. Translated by Rhodes, Erroll F. Grand Rapids, MI: Wm. B. Eerdmans. ISBN 0-8028-0788-7.
