= The Military Philosophers =

Novel by Anthony Powell

- Author: Anthony Powell
- Cover artist: James Broom-Lynne
- Series: A Dance to the Music of Time
- Publisher: Heinemann
- Publication date: 1968
- Publication place: United Kingdom
- Preceded by: The Soldier's Art
- Followed by: Books Do Furnish a Room

The Military Philosophers is the ninth of Anthony Powell's twelve-novel sequence A Dance to the Music of Time. First published in 1968, it covers the latter part of Nicholas Jenkins' service in World War II. It is the last in Powell's war trilogy, and Jenkins is assigned to a War Office Section with the Allies of World War II.

Jenkins has a desk job in Whitehall in acting as a liaison officer first with the Poles and later with the Belgians and Czechs. In the background of the narrative he is reading Athenae Oxonienses by Anthony Wood, Brief Historical Relation of State Affairs: from September 1678 to April 1714 by Narcissus Luttrell and Marcel Proust.

The novel begins with a teletype message that small detachments of Poles were crossing the USSR frontier into Iraq. Gradually the reader realizes that the Katyn Forest Massacre pervades this novel.

Pamela Flitton, a driver for the ATS, drives Jenkins to the second Bureau of the Polish GHQ. Jenkins realizes that she is Charles Stringham's niece. She informs him that Stringham had not been heard from since he was posted to Singapore.

Nick is conducting officer for Allied military attachés on a visit to France, Brussels, and the Netherlands. At the Field Marshal's Tactical HQ they meet with Bernard Montgomery.

Writing in The New York Review, John Gross observed, "The Military Philosophers represents a return to Powell’s most accomplished comic vein. It is also, on occasion, unexpectedly moving—unexpectedly, because both Powell’s principal literary modes depend to a large degree for their success on a positive withholding of sympathy."

The Military Philosophers is dedicated to Georgina Ward, the actress who appeared in the theatrical version of Powell's novel, Afternoon Men.
