= The Darling Buds of May =

The Darling Buds of May may refer to:

- The Darling Buds of May (novel), a 1958 novel by H. E. Bates
  - The Darling Buds of May (TV series), a 1991–1993 TV series based on the novel
  - The Mating Game (film), a 1959 film adaptation
  - The Larkins (2021 TV series)
- Darling Buds of May (album), a 2006 album by the rock band Faulter
- "Darling Buds of May", a 2011 song by Viva Brother from Famous First Words
- "The darling buds of May", a quote from William Shakespeare's Sonnet 18

== See also ==
- The Darling Buds
