= The Larkins =

The Larkins may refer to:

- The Larkins (1958 TV series), a British TV comedy series broadcast between 1958 and 1964
- The Larkins (2021 TV series), a British TV comedy drama that ran for two series in 2021-2
- the family which is the subject of The Darling Buds of May (novel) (1958) and its sequels
