= When the Green Woods Laugh =

1960 novel

- First Edition
- Author: H. E. Bates
- Language: English
- Genre: Comedy
- Publisher: Michael Joseph; Little, Brown (US)
- Publication date: 1960
- Publication place: United Kingdom
- Media type: Print
- Preceded by: A Breath of French Air
- Followed by: Oh! To be in England

When the Green Woods Laugh is a 1960 comedy novel by the British writer H. E. Bates. It is the third in the series began by the 1958 novel The Darling Buds of May focusing on the Larkins, a family living in rural Kent. The title is a reference to William Blake's poem Laughing Song. It was published in America by Little, Brown under the alternative title Hark, Hark, the Lark!.

Pop Larkin makes a profit by selling a dilapidated country mansion he has acquired to a wealthy couple from London, and then has to fend off the romantic advances of one of their guests, Mrs. Perigo. Things take a more serious note when, after he rejects her approaches, she accuses him of assault and he ends up in court.

In 1991 it was adapted into two episodes of the first series of ITV's The Darling Buds of May featuring David Jason and Catherine Zeta-Jones.

== Bibliography ==
- Baldwin, Dean R. H.E. Bates: A Literary Life. Susquehanna University Press, 1987.
- Birch, Dinah (ed.) The Oxford Companion to English Literature. Oxford University Press, 2009.
- Jacob, Merle & Apple, Hope. To be Continued: An Annotated Guide to Sequels. Greenwood Publishing Group, 2000.
