= Love for Lydia (TV series) =

1977 British television series

- Based on: Love for Lydia by: H. E. Bates
- Written by: Julian Bond
- Starring: Mel Martin; Christopher Blake; Peter Davison; Jeremy Irons; Sherrie Hewson
- Country of origin: United Kingdom
- Original language: English
- No. of series: 1
- No. of episodes: 13

Production
- Producer: Tony Wharmby
- Production company: LWT

Original release
- Network: ITV
- Release: 9 September – 2 December 1977

Love for Lydia is a British television serial made by London Weekend Television and broadcast from 9 September to 2 December 1977 on ITV. It is based on the novel by H. E. Bates, first published in 1952. The series was written by Julian Bond. This period serial stars Mel Martin in the title role of Lydia Aspen. The series has a total of 13 episodes. It is available on DVD in both the UK and North American markets.

== Premise ==
In his teen years, Edward Richardson meets the soon-to-be wealthy Lydia Aspen. She has been brought to live with her aunts and uncle in Evensford after the death of her father. The two begin a romance that swings between love and disillusion, chiefly brought on by their immaturity. The story spans the pre-depression era and after with both tragedy and self-realization.

== Cast ==
- Mel Martin as Lydia Aspen
- Christopher Blake as Edward Richardson
- Sherrie Hewson as Nancy Holland
- Peter Davison as Tom Holland
- Jeremy Irons as Alex Sanderson
- Beatrix Lehmann as Bertie Aspen
- Rachel Kempson as Juliana Aspen
- Michael Aldridge as Captain Rollo Aspen
- Ralph Arliss as Blackie Johnson
- Christopher Hancock as Mr Richardson
- David Ryall as Bretherton
- Wendy Gifford as Mrs Sanderson

== Episodes ==
No.	Title	Directed by	Written by	Original release date
1	"Episode 1"	Tony Wharmby	Julian Bond	9 September 1977
Edward Richardson, an unhappy reporter for the newspaper in Evensford, meets Lydia Aspen. She is living in the "big house" with her elderly aunts and uncle after the death of her father.
2	"Episode 2"	Tony Wharmby	Julian Bond	16 September 1977
Richardson neglects his job to go ice-skating with Lydia. She appears shy at first. Richardson introduces her to his friends Tom and Nancy Holland as he becomes more infatuated with Lydia.
3	"Episode 3"	Tony Wharmby	Julian Bond	23 September 1977
After quitting his job, Richardson and Lydia have a falling out. He attempts to write a novel but fails. His best friend Alex coaxes him to invite Lydia along on a picnic and the two rekindle their relationship.
4	"Episode 4"	John Glenister	Julian Bond	30 September 1977
Lydia becomes bolder. Aunt Bertie invites Richardson to take Lydia to a dance also in company with Tom, Nancy, Alex and Alex's mother. They meet Blackie Johnson, the driver of their rented car.
5	"Episode 5"	Unknown	Julian Bond	7 October 1977
With Blackie as their driver, Lydia, Richardson and friends attend numerous dances. Lydia begins to become bored and seeks more excitement. Both Tom and Alex become fascinated with Lydia as Richardson becomes more disconcerted with her flirting.
6	"Episode 6"	Tony Wharmby	Julian Bond	14 October 1977
At Lydia's insistence, the group attend a village hop, much to Alex and Richardson's contempt. They discover Lydia dancing with Blackie and are appalled.
7	"Episode 7"	Piers Haggard	Julian Bond	21 October 1977
Lydia's aunts throw a grand party for her 21st birthday. Richardson proposes marriage and is rejected. A fire at Blackie's garage ends the celebration.
8	"Episode 8"	Michael Simpson	Julian Bond	28 October 1977
After deciding they will only be friends, Richardson struggles with the decision but Lydia does not. Alex is interested in Lydia. After seeing Lydia and Blackie together in the parking lot, Richardson misinterprets the situation which leads to a tragic accident.
9	"Episode 9"	Simon Langton	Julian Bond	4 November 1977
Richardson no longer sees Lydia after her rejection of his proposal. He begins to live and work on Tom's farm. Tom is drawn into trouble when a neighbor's daughter becomes infatuated with Tom. Lydia's attentions are now on Tom.
10	"Episode 10"	Unknown	Julian Bond	11 November 1977
Lydia and Tom are now deeply involved but Tom has more strife brought on by the neighbors daughter. Richardson makes plans to move to London when tragedy again strikes. Richardson rejects Lydia.
11	"Episode 11"	Unknown	Julian Bond	18 November 1977
Now living, working and writing in London, Richardson tries to bring his life together without Lydia. Lydia begins to sink into a life of alcohol and parties, spending her inheritance as she goes.
12	"Episode 12"	Christopher Hodson	Julian Bond	25 November 1977
Based on his publisher's advice, Richardson moves back to Evensford and continues writing. He discovers Lydia is hospitalized and attended by Blackie. He visits her regularly.
13	"Episode 13"	Christopher Hodson	Julian Bond	2 December 1977
Lydia struggles with her recovery, relying on Richardson. Lydia now wants Richardson in her life and he must make a decision.

== Reception ==
In a contemporary review, John J. O'Connor of The New York Times found two weaknesses with the series; it was "too long" for the source material and he thought the characters too stereotypical. O’Connor thought highly of the cast and although there were flaws he wrote "this is a production obviously involving uncommon intelligence. Extraordinary care has been taken on all levels." He summarized: "It often demands patience, but attention will be rewarded with touches of rare insight."
