= The Darling Buds of May (TV series) =

British television comedy drama series (1991–1993)

- Series titles
- Starring: David Jason; Pam Ferris; Philip Franks; Catherine Zeta-Jones
- Theme music composer: Pip Burley
- Country of origin: United Kingdom
- Original language: English
- No. of series: 3
- No. of episodes: 20

Production
- Running time: 50 minutes approx.
- Production companies: Excelsior Productions; Yorkshire Television

Original release
- Network: ITV
- Release: 7 April 1991 – 4 April 1993

The Darling Buds of May is a British comedy drama television series, produced by Yorkshire Television for the ITV network, first broadcast between 7 April 1991 and 4 April 1993. The first six episodes of Series 1 and the first two of Series 2 are adaptations of the 1958 novel of the same name, and three of its four sequels, by H. E. Bates. The remaining episodes are original storylines based on the same format.

Set in rural 1950s Kent, it follows the life of the Larkin family. It stars David Jason as "Pop" Larkin alongside Pam Ferris as "Ma" Larkin, with Catherine Zeta-Jones playing their eldest daughter Mariette, who marries tax inspector Cedric "Charley" Charlton, played by Philip Franks. A ratings success, it was Zeta-Jones's breakthrough role.

Featuring a total of 20 episodes, it was broadcast as three series of six double-episode storylines in the spring of 1991, 1992 and 1993, plus two single-episode Christmas specials aired in 1991 and 1992.

The title is from the third line of Shakespeare's sonnet 18.

== Synopsis ==
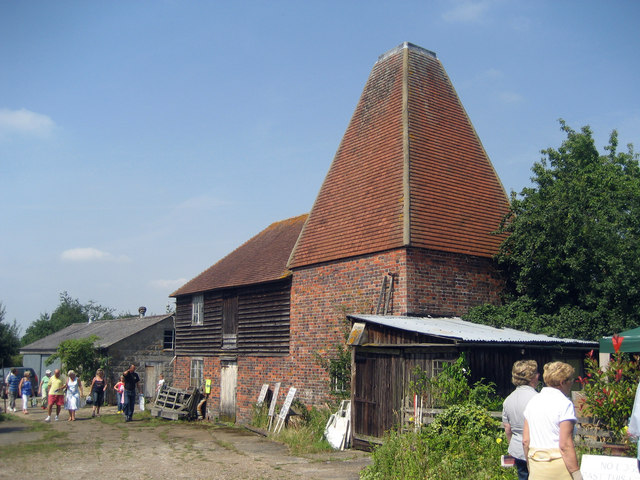
The square oast house of Buss Farm, featured in the opening credits, seen in 2007

The Larkin family live on a smallholding in rural England, in the county of Kent. Sidney ("Pop") and his common-law wife Florence ("Ma") have six children: eldest daughter Mariette, followed by their (at first, only) son Montgomery, and other daughters Primrose, twins Zinnia and Petunia, and Victoria. Ma is a housewife while Pop supplements his farm income with various other, not entirely legitimate, enterprises. Tax collector Cedric ("Charley") visits to audit Pop but falls in love with Mariette and quits his job to live the rural life. As Ma and Pop raise their other children, Charley attempts to provide for his now wife Mariette. Ma and Pop soon have a seventh child, Oscar, followed around a year later by Charley and Mariette's first baby, John Blenheim.

Pop and Ma's relationship is depicted as loving and affectionate throughout, although Pop is flirtatious and subject to numerous advances, most of which Ma is aware of and evidently unconcerned by. Proud of all his children, Pop's schemes provide well for the family, enough to fund boarding school for the twins, naval boarding school for Monty, a swimming pool, a fairground, and a holiday to France, although he is just as motivated by doing good and helping others as making a profit. Ma occasionally becomes involved in Pop's schemes, or creates a scheme of her own. Possessing some very close friends, their lifestyle, in particular the fact they have never been married, nonetheless raises eyebrows in the stuffy environs of the local village.

Mariette and Charley's relationship is more torrid, in part due to his insecurity over Mariette being so attractive, and Charley's varying success in providing financially, with their newly acquired hop garden struggling. Mariette's business skills eventually come to bear as they purchase a local brewery. Primrose is depicted as a frustrated romantic, moving to France to live with a boy her own age and attempting to seduce both Charley and the village minister upon her return. Monty meanwhile contends with bullying, both at home and at naval boarding school. The increasingly mischievous twins gradually grow apart from their younger sibling Victoria, who delights in teasing and embarrassing all her siblings, especially Primrose.

== Period ==
All the episodes are seemingly set during 1958–59, despite the timespan of events across all three series making this a logical impossibility. The first serial is based on the first book, written and set in 1958, during which Florence finds out she is pregnant. In the second serial ("When the Green Woods Laugh"), Sidney is accused of committing indecent assault on 23 August 1958, with the trial taking place on the same day as Charley and Mariette's wedding. The date of the trial is given as 7 July; this would seem to be a continuity error, because it cannot be July of the following year, as Florence's baby had not yet been born. By the time of the third serial ("A Breath of French Air"), Florence has already given birth to Oscar, and the Larkins have a late-August holiday in Brittany, coinciding with Charley and Mariette celebrating their first wedding anniversary. The fourth serial ("Christmas is Coming") is set at Christmas, and it is established Mariette is five months pregnant; she gives birth in the fifth serial ("Oh! To Be in England!"), which would be some time in the spring of 1960 at the earliest, according to the dating of the first series and the chronology of events up to that point.

However, in the sixth serial ("Stranger at the Gates") the twins celebrate their birthday, which a close-up of a wall calendar reveals to be 15 August 1959. In the eighth serial ("Le Grand Weekend"), the Larkins' weekend getaway coincides with Charles de Gaulle's state visit, which would date the events of the episode to April 1960, if it does indeed coincide with the real-life visit. Primrose's birthday was revealed to be in May in "Stranger at the Gates", and she celebrates it in the ninth serial, "The Happiest Days of Your Life", dating the events to either May 1960 (using the retconned second series date) or 1961 (going by the date given in the first series).

By the eleventh serial ("Climb the Greasy Pole"), when the children are older and the babies have grown to toddlerhood, another close-up of a calendar reveals the month to be October 1959. At the end of the final episode, Sidney is elected to the Rural District Council on 5 November 1959 (Guy Fawkes Night).

== Cast ==
=== Main cast members ===
Of the four main cast members, Jason and Ferris appeared in all twenty episodes, while Zeta-Jones and Franks appeared in eighteen, their only absences being in the third series' double episode "Cast Not Your Pearls Before Swine" (3.3 & 3.4).

- David Jason, as Sidney Charles "Pop" Larkin, the father of the family
- Pam Ferris, as Florence Daisy "Ma" (Parker) Larkin, the mother of the family
- Catherine Zeta-Jones, as Mariette Charlton, née Larkin, eldest Larkin daughter
- Philip Franks, Cedric "Charley" Charlton, husband of Mariette

=== Recurring cast – Larkin family ===
The actors playing the other Larkin children and grandchild were as below (listed in descending character age). All the children except those yet to be born appeared in the first episode. After appearing in the first six episodes, the actor playing Primrose was replaced, the second appearing from the seventh episode (the first Christmas special) onwards. The actors playing the roles of Oscar and John Blenheim first appear in episodes 1.5 and 2.1, respectively. Although a male character, John Blenheim was played by Daisy-May Bates, granddaughter of the author of the books.

- Julie Stichbury, as Primrose Larkin (1991) (6 episodes)
- Abigail Rokison, as Primrose Larkin (1991–1993) (12 episodes)
- Ian Tucker, as Montgomery "Monty" Larkin, their elder son (13 episodes)
- Christina Giles, as Petunia Larkin, twin sister to Zinnia (18 episodes)
- Katherine Giles, as Zinnia Larkin, twin sister to Petunia (18 episodes)
- Stephanie Ralph, as Victoria Larkin, the youngest Larkin daughter (19 episodes)
- Ross Marriott, as Oscar Larkin, their younger son (16 episodes)
- Daisy-May Bates, as John Marlborough Churchill Blenheim Charlton, the only son of Charlie and Mariette (11 episodes)

=== Recurring cast – others ===
Various other actors appeared in more than one storyline, i.e. in more than one double episode.

- Rachel Bell as Edith Pilchester, a local spinster (16 episodes)
- Moray Watson as the Brigadier, a local retired army officer (11 episodes)
- Kika Mirylees as Angela Snow, a local woman (7 episodes)
- Martyn Read as Sergeant Wilson, a local police officer (6 episodes)
- Tyler Butterworth as the Reverend John Candy, the local vicar (4 episodes)
- Michael Jayston as Ernest Bristow, the brewery owner (4 episodes)
- Carol MacReady as Mrs. Daws, a local shopkeeper (4 episodes)
- Sheila Burrell as Mrs. Kinthley, owner of the hop-garden bought by Charlie (4 episodes)
- Steven Brand as Tom Sargent, brewery worker and confidant to Mariette (4 episodes)
- Anna Massey as Mademoiselle Antoinette Dupont, a French hotelier (3 episodes)
- Michael Culver as Sir George Bluff-Gore, a local landowner (3 episodes)
- Richenda Carey as Lady Bluff-Gore, wife of Sir George (3 episodes)
- John Carlin as the Reverend Mr Spink (3 episodes)

== Episodes ==
=== Series 1 ===
No.	Title	Original broadcast
1.1 & 1.2	"The Darling Buds of May"	7 and 14 April 1991
Cedric Charlton, a tax inspector, arrives on Home Farm to make Pop Larkin fill in his tax form. He is attracted to their beautiful daughter, Mariette, and the family distract him further by persuading him to join their meal. They play crib and get him drunk, forcing him to stay the night. He wakes with a hangover, and is unfit to return home, but starts increasingly to disregard his life in the office. He accompanies the family on their annual strawberry-picking trip, where he attracts Pauline Jackson, the local flirt. Mariette and Pauline fight for him, but Mariette wins and the episode ends with Mr Charlton (called Charley by the family) proposing to Mariette, and Pop Larkin giving them his blessing.
1.3 & 1.4	"When the Green Woods Laugh"	21 and 28 April 1991
The day of Charley and Mariette's wedding is looming. Pop sells a country mansion to an aristocratic couple. When Pop rejects the advances of Corrine Perrigo (Celia Imrie), she gets her revenge by persuading the woman to charge him with assault, when all he attempted was to stop her from falling. The Brigadier is best man for the wedding. Eventually, Pop is found not guilty and the wedding goes ahead.
1.5 & 1.6	"A Breath of French Air"	5 and 12 May 1991
The Larkins go on holiday to Brittany where the weather is appalling, the food poor and the hotel receptionist unfriendly. The weather improves and after a mechanic sees the crest on the doors of Pa Larkin's car and thinks him a lord, everyone is treated better and the hotel patronne, Mademoiselle Dupont, gives Pop and Ma her room. Primrose falls in love with a local boy and wants to stay in France, whilst there is tension between Charley and Mariette when she attracts the attention of local young men on the beach. She refuses to go on a miniature railway with Charlie and he goes on his own. The train is late and he wanders into a bar where he meets a tomboy and her pals, who get him drunk. He misses the train and is escorted home by Pop, where he quickly sobers up at the sight of Mariette playing in the sea with her new male friends. Charley drags her away, showing a more decisive side to his character which Mariette likes. The Larkins get together with the tomboy (Max, short for Maxime), Angela Snow (who also happens to be visiting France) and her sister, Iris, and organise a wedding anniversary celebration for Charley and Mariette at the hotel.
1.7	"Christmas is Coming!"	22 December 1991
As Christmas approaches, Charley and Mariette go to view a house to rent, unaware that Tommy Mason, an escaped convict, is hiding there. Pop later discovers him in the Larkins' hen-house where Victoria is taking food to him. He explains that, since his imprisonment, his wife has severed all ties with him, but he is anxious to see his children. Pop usually dresses as Father Christmas to give local children toys, but Charley suggests Tommy play the part so he can see his children, which he does, as well as making up with his wife and then returning to prison. Mrs Mason and her children join the throng already invited to spend Christmas Day with the Larkins.

=== Series 2 ===
No.	Title	Original broadcast
2.1 & 2.2	"Oh! To Be in England!"	26 January and 2 February 1992
Mlle Dupont comes to stay with the Larkins, and discovers the truth – Mr Larkin is not a lord. She is disappointed, but comes to terms with it, and enjoys her stay. Pop saves an old woman from being cheated, and buys a fair from his friend, Fruity Pears, who is unable to run it after being attacked by thugs. Primrose's relationship with the French boy has fizzled out; back in the UK, she falls for the Rev Mr Candy, the young vicar in charge of christening the young Larkins ... and a newly arrived Charlton.
2.3 & 2.4	"Stranger at the Gates"	9 and 16 February 1992
A young man named Pieter, who says he is Danish, arrives on the farm, and starts doing odd jobs for the people in the village. Everyone, including Mariette, thinks he's the bee's knees, much to the resentment of Charley. Meanwhile, Montgomery is being bullied by local boys, and Primrose is attempting to win Mr Candy's heart. She mistakes his sister for a girlfriend, and angrily leaves him. Charley discovers that Pieter is German and has been hiding his identity because of the anti-German sentiment in post-World War II Britain. The villagers turn against him on this discovery, but Pieter is restored to favour again after he rescues John Watson, one of the bullies, from a quarry ledge. The Larkins arrange for Pieter to marry his girlfriend, an English lady named Eileen.
2.5 & 2.6	"A Season of Heavenly Gifts"	23 February and 1 March 1992
Pop Larkin unwittingly becomes involved in smuggling when he receives gifts from a grateful pilot he helped after a crash-landing. Meanwhile, an evil Polish man named Mr Cope attempts to prevent Charley and Mariette from buying Mrs Kinthley's hopgarden. The pilot invites the family to a party at his club, which they greatly enjoy. Montgomery Larkin is unhappy at Naval College, where he is training to be a sailor in the merchant navy. The family go to his Open Day; the Brigadier goes along and helps them solve the problem by showing Pop how to humiliate the bullying instructor, Strickland.
2.7	"Le Grand Weekend"	26 December 1992
Pop and Ma's proposed weekend in Paris is disrupted by a storm, and they spend the time in a country house.

=== Series 3 ===
No.	Title	Original broadcast
3.1 & 3.2	"The Happiest Days of Your Life"	28 February and 7 March 1993
The twins go to boarding school, while Charley starts doing the books as a part-time job for the brewery to which he wishes to sell his hops. Charley and Mariette decide to buy the brewery. The whole family repairs the twins' boarding school, which was otherwise going to be forced to close by the bank for not keeping up with the repairs.
3.3 & 3.4	"Cast Not Your Pearls Before Swine"	14 and 21 March 1993
Pop builds a swimming pool, and buys two hundred pigs from George Harran, a confidence trickster who is also cheating Edith, who has fallen in love with him. Meanwhile, Primrose has a new love interest: Roger McGarry, a Liverpool poet who is a member of the swimming pool building crew. Pop prepares a trick against George to put all to rights without hurting Edith. Primrose runs away to Liverpool in pursuit of her love after Victoria teases her, causing Pop to realise the scam, but returns home when she realises he is not the man for her.
3.5 & 3.6	"Climb the Greasy Pole"	28 March and 4 April 1993
Pop runs for rural councillor while Charley and Mariette struggle at the brewery and have problems in their relationship. Gypsies get involved in Pop's campaign for rural councillor. Charley and Mariette have to work on their marriage, as Mariette is attracted to Tom Sargent, after which they at last finalise the deal to buy Bristow's brewery.

== Production ==
=== Conception and development ===
Having been sold to MGM films in 1959, it was not until 1989 that Richard Bates, son of the author of the original books H. E. Bates, was able to purchase the rights to the novels. At the same time, Yorkshire Television was looking for a new project for David Jason, who had starred for them in A Bit of a Do. Richard Bates went on to executive produce the show, alongside Vernon Lawrence of Yorkshire Television.

=== Casting ===
Bates had originally considered Bob Hoskins as ideal for the role of Pop, but Lawrence was of the view his increasing fame as a film actor would create problems. Jason was cast first, followed by Ferris and Franks. Finding an actor to fit with the novel's description of Mariette as a black-haired and olive-skinned beauty proved difficult, with more than 300 hopefuls being rejected until Zeta-Jones was cast. With filming due to start, she had been spotted appearing in 42nd Street at the Drury Lane theatre.

=== Filming ===
Each one-hour episode took two weeks to film, followed by two months in post-production.

=== Filming locations ===
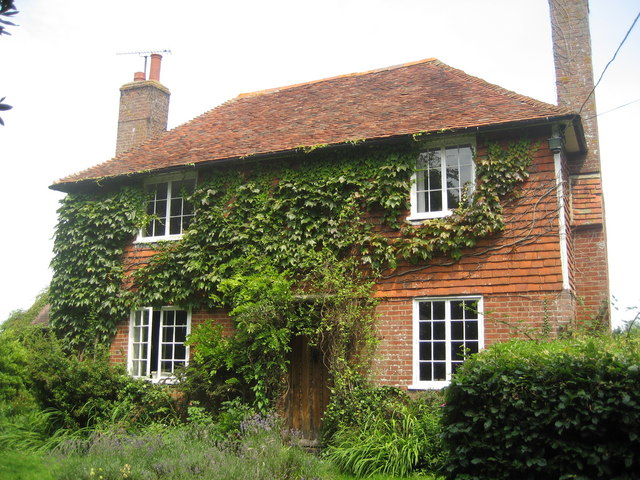
Farmhouse of Buss Farm, seen in 2007

Much of the series was filmed in and around the village of Pluckley in Kent; executive producer Richard Bates lived just a few miles away.

The location for "Home Farm", the Larkin residence, was Buss Farm, a few miles south of Pluckley, owned by the Holmes family. All four main buildings of the Grade II listed farm were utilised: the farmhouse itself, a square oast house (depicted in the title sequence), a Tudor barn and cart lodge. After being put up for sale by the family in 2012, it was purchased in 2013 by a businessman. It was renamed "Darling Buds Farm", and several buildings were converted into guest accommodation themed around the show.

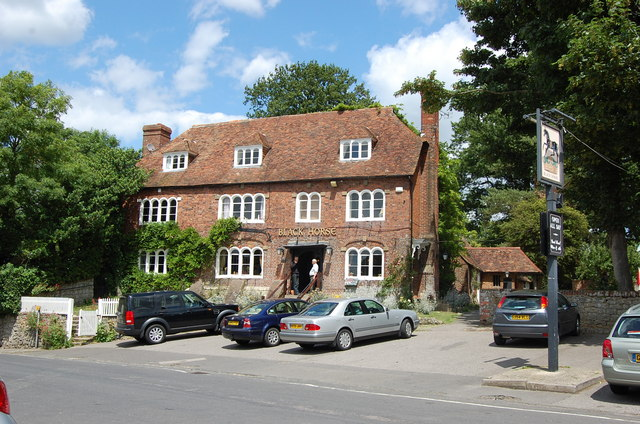
The Black Horse pub in Pluckley, seen in 2009

Other locations in Pluckley village itself were used extensively; the Black Horse pub in The Street was renamed the Hare and Hounds and used as the Larkins' local. Church Gate Cottage and Fig Tree Cottage in The Street served as Edith Pilchester's and The Brigadier's homes, respectively. Pluckley primary school, also in The Street, served as the village hall. The butcher's shop also featured, and the Post Office (dressed as the grocer's). Church scenes were filmed at St Nicholas' Church in the village.

The cricket scenes were filmed at Little Chart Cricket Club, a village north east of Pluckley.

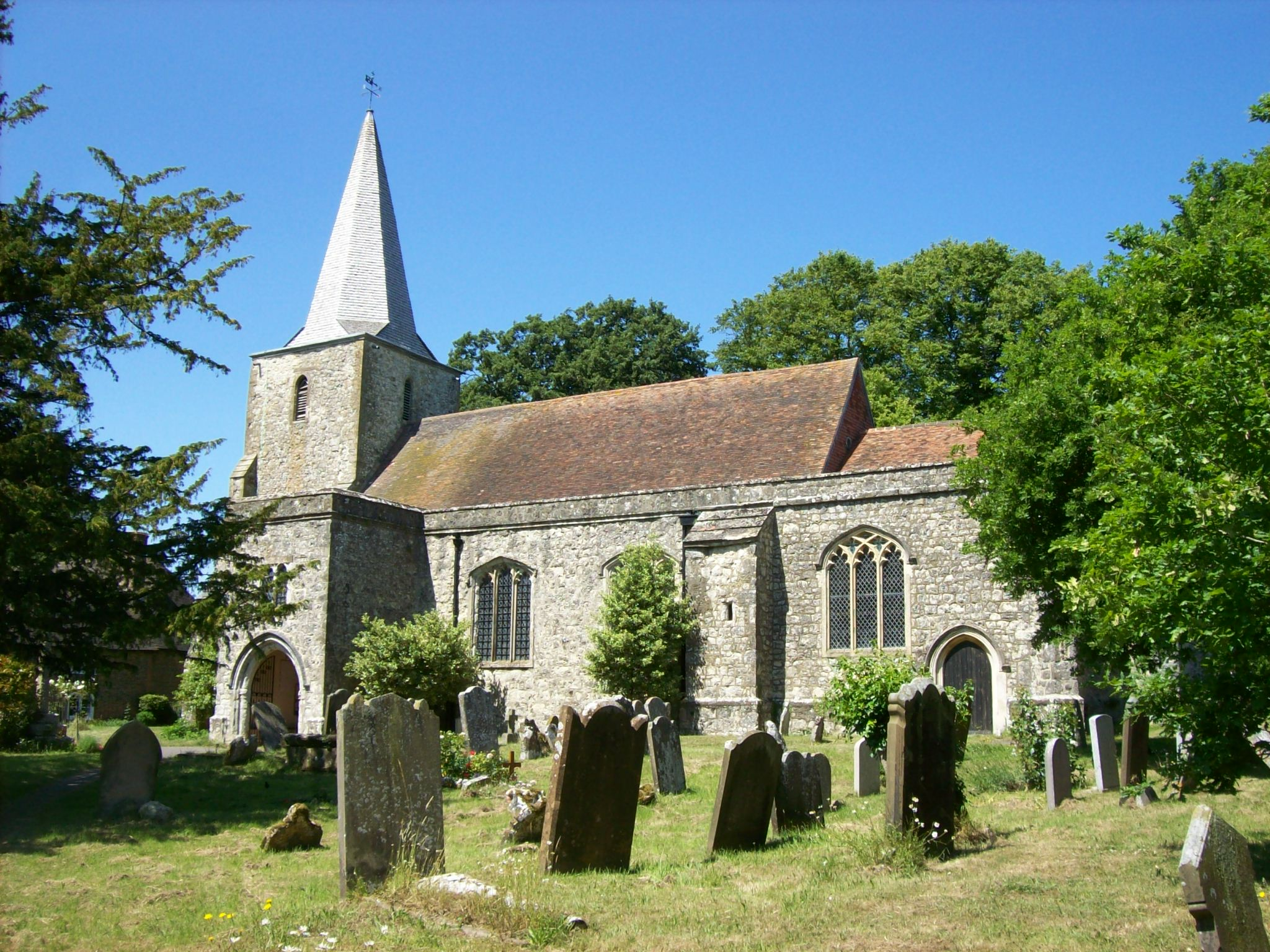
St Nicholas' Church, Pluckley, seen in 2013

Further afield, in and around Tenterden, Kent, Halden Place in Halden Lane, Cranbrook, served as Mrs Kinthley's hop garden, Wentwood Cottage in Swain Road served as Charley and Mariette's cottage, and the Kent & East Sussex Railway was the location of Charley's arrival in Kent, and the station used by Ma, Charley and Mariette shopping for her wedding dress. Other scenes shot in Kent included the Shepherd Neame Brewery in Faversham, and scenes of the Larkins' beach holiday, filmed in Folkestone, including a backdrop of the Leas Lift. Mlle Dupont is met by the Larkins at Folkestone Harbour after her channel crossing.

Little filming was done inside the farmhouse, the interiors having been shot in a studio at Yorkshire Television. Scenes shot in the former Wennington School near Wetherby in Yorkshire, which stood in for Bluff Hall, were included. Other filming locations in Yorkshire include the Hotel Metropole in Leeds, which stood in for the 'Marble Arch Hotel'.

To mark the series' 20th anniversary, Kent County Council established a tourist trail featuring the various film locations, other local attractions, and Kent food.

=== Music ===
The series' music producer Pip Burley wrote the title theme, "Perfick!". He had submitted the piece anonymously, having deemed the submissions received from a shortlist of composers missed the point of the essential romanticism of the show. Although it also featured lyrics, drawn from the words used in the novels, the theme music for the series did not feature them. The song with lyrics was later sung by David Jason for the radio adaptation of the last book in the Larkin series, A Little of What You Fancy.

=== Future ===
In 2016, having filmed a cinema adaptation of another classic TV series, Dad's Army, Zeta-Jones responded positively to suggestions that The Darling Buds of May might also be similarly remade, stating "I'd be playing Ma Larkin, but I'm up for it". However, by 2020, any plans for a film were put on hold, with the Radio Times reporting that ITV was to remake the series, with Simon Nye writing the scripts and with Bradley Walsh and Joanna Scanlan in the cast. The series, with the title The Larkins, first aired in October 2021 starring Walsh and Scanlan, with Sabrina Bartlett and Peter Davison also amongst the cast.

== Themes ==
Locally produced food and drink intentionally played a core role in the series. Local supplies being unripe, the strawberries used in the series were imported from Holland. One of the most iconic scenes features Pop and Ma eating a meal together whilst having a bath. With several scenes featuring eating, the fact Ferris was a vegetarian had to be worked around by the production staff. Both Ferris and Jason gained weight due to the amount of food they had to consume, often doing multiple takes for several scenes at one time, to make the scenes look realistic.

Another theme of the series was the Larkin family's habit of giving their children unusual or themed first and middle names. Mariette was created by combining 'Marie' and 'Antoinette'. Montgomery was named after wartime officer Field Marshal Montgomery. Victoria was named for being born during the plum season (Victoria plum). While Monty and Victoria have no middle names, the other children have several: Primrose Violet Anemone Iris Magnolia Narcissa, twins Petunia June Florence Nightingale and Zinnia June Florence Nightingale, and Oscar Columbus Septimus Dupont, the last one being in tribute to the French hotelier Madamoiselle Dupont, who features in the series. Mariette and Charlie continue the family penchant for elaborate naming by christening their son John Marlborough Churchill Blenheim.

== Release ==
=== Broadcast ===
The first episode was transmitted on ITV at 8.00 pm on a Sunday.

=== Home media ===
When the series was first released on video, it sold £1m worth of copies in the first four days.

Title	Region	Release date	Features
The Complete Series	Region 1 DVD	22 February 2011	BFS Entertainment; 20 episodes; 5 discs; Special features: Interviews with Catherine Zeta-Jones & David Jason; Photo gallery; Biographies; Selected filmographies; Trivia
The Best of The Darling Buds of May	Region 2 DVD	15 July 2002	Cinema Club; 6 episodes: "The Darling Buds of May" (parts 1 & 2); "Stranger at the Gates" (parts 1 & 2); "The Happiest Days of Your Life" (parts 1 & 2); 2 discs; BBFC rating: PG; Special features: Photo library
The Perfick Collection [sic]	Region 2 DVD	10 November 2003	Cinema Club; 20 episodes; 5 discs; BBFC rating: PG; No special features listed
The Complete Series – Special Edition	Region 2 DVD	7 February 2005	ITV DVD; 20 episodes; 6 discs; BBFC rating: PG; Special features: Exclusive commentary with Pam Ferris & Philip Franks
The Complete Boxset	Region 2 DVD	Unknown release	ITV DVD; 20 episodes; 6 discs; BBFC rating: PG; No special features listed
The Complete Series – Special Edition (reissue from 2005)	Region 2 DVD	1 September 2008	ITV DVD; 20 episodes; 6 discs; BBFC rating: PG; Special features: Exclusive commentary
The Complete 20th Anniversary Collection	Region 2 DVD	15 August 2011	ITV DVD; 20 episodes; 6 discs; BBFC rating: PG; Special features: Exclusive commentary with Pam Ferris & Philip Franks on the Darling Buds of May episode
The Best of The Darling Buds of May	Region 4 DVD	Unknown release	Universal Pictures; 6 episodes: "The Darling Buds of May" (parts 1 & 2); "Stranger at the Gates" (parts 1 & 2); "The Happiest Days of Your Life" (parts 1 & 2); 2 discs; ACB rating: PG; Special features: Photo library
Series One	Region 4 DVD	3 March 2007	Shock Records; 6 episodes & bonus episode: "Christmas is Coming"; 2 discs; ACB rating: PG; No special features listed
Series Two	Region 4 DVD	5 May 2007	Shock Records; 6 episodes & bonus episode: "Le Grande Weekend"; 2 discs; ACB rating: G; No special features listed
Series Three	Region 4 DVD	2 July 2007	Shock Records; 6 episodes; 2 discs; ACB rating: PG; No special features listed
The Complete Collection	Region 4 DVD	1 October 2007	Shock Records; 20 episodes; 6 discs; ACB rating: PG; No special features listed
The Complete Collection (reissue from 2007)	Region 4 DVD	29 March 2008	Shock Records; 20 episodes; 6 discs; ACB rating: PG; No special features listed'
The Complete Collection	Region 4 DVD	6 February 2013	Roadshow Entertainment; 20 episodes; 6 discs; ACB rating: PG; Same packaging as the UK 2011 version; Special features: Exclusive commentary with Pam Ferris & Philip Franks on the Darling Buds of May episode
The Complete Collection	Region 4 DVD	3 June 2020	Via Vision; 20 episodes; 6 discs; ACB rating: PG; Special features: Audio commentary with Pam Ferris & Philip Franks
The Complete Series	Region B Blu-ray (AU)	30 April 2025	Via Vision; 20 episodes; 6 discs; New 16:9 remaster; ACB rating: PG; Special features: Audio commentary with Pam Ferris & Philip Franks

Note: The 2008 and 2011 DVD sets from ITV Studios list that there are 11 episodes; this is due to the fact that all episodes in series 1–3 (not including the specials) contain two parts, making them count as a whole.

=== Soundtrack ===
A 16-track soundtrack of the series was released by EMI on CD in 1991.

== Reception ==
The series was a ratings success, its "feel-good" factor during economic recession often noted as the reason. Whilst Yorkshire TV classified it as a drama, audiences and critics have generally considered it to be a comedy-drama.

The first episode broke a British broadcasting record, becoming the first instance of a new series topping the national ratings, beating the soap opera Coronation Street (also an ITV production) on the night. This came as a shock to producers, although they had been hopeful of good ratings due to dull weather and the belief that people would be looking for something to lift their spirits following the end of the Gulf War.

Jason attributed the series' popularity to the public wanting a more wholesome, inclusive and inoffensive viewing option at a time when violence on television was increasing. This was one of the main reasons he decided to take the role.

The series generated an upsurge in sales of H. E. Bates's novels.

=== Awards ===
- 1992 Ivor Novello Award – Best Theme from a TV/Radio Production

== Source novels and other adaptations ==
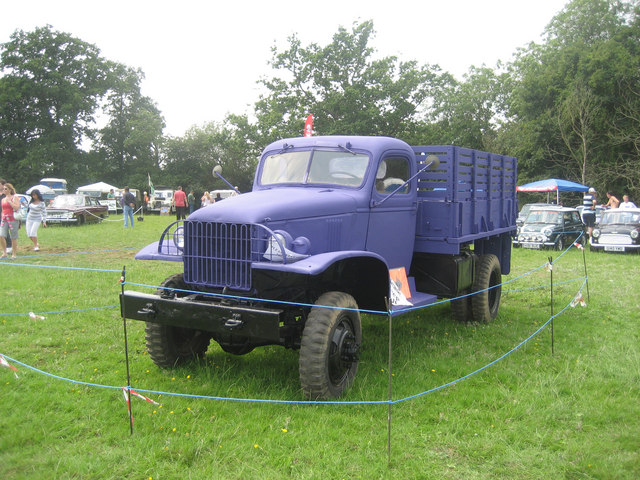
The Larkin family truck, seen at the Darling Buds Classic Car Show at Buss Farm in 2007

The series is based on the works of H. E. Bates, who died in 1974. Having moved from the industrialised English Midlands to a granary in Little Chart in Kent in 1930 in search of new inspirations for his work, he was initially frustrated in his efforts to create a novel based on the Kent way of life. His inspiration for the Larkin stories eventually came in 1955 while on a trip to Sittingbourne. Pausing at Faversham, he observed the joyful camaraderie of a large boisterous family as they emerged from a shop and departed in a large blue truck. Combining this with observations of another family on a nearby small-holding, he set about writing about how these families might live. Originally a short story, he expanded it into a novel, followed by a further four books, the titles of the first four of which were used as episode titles for the TV series:

- The Darling Buds of May (1958)
- A Breath of French Air (1959)
- When the Green Woods Laugh (1960)
- Oh! To be in England! (1963)
- A Little of What You Fancy? (1970)

The first novel in the series was originally adapted to the screen in 1959 as The Mating Game, starring Debbie Reynolds and Tony Randall as Mariette and Charley.

The fifth novel, A Little of What You Fancy?, was never adapted for television, but it was adapted into a six-part series by Eric Pringle for BBC Radio, with Jason and Ferris reprising their roles, first airing in February 1996.

In May 2011 a stage production of the series was put on at Buss Farm.

The most recent version is The Larkins, adapted for television in 2021.
