= H. E. Bates =

British writer (1905–1974)

H. E. Bates CBE
- Born: Herbert Ernest Bates; 16 May 1905; Rushden, Northamptonshire, England
- Died: 29 January 1974 (aged 68); Canterbury, Kent, England
- Citizenship: United Kingdom
- Occupation: Writer
- Writing career
- Language: English
- Genres: Novels, short stories
- Notable works: Love for Lydia, The Darling Buds of May, My Uncle Silas, Fair Stood the Wind for France

Herbert Ernest Bates (16 May 1905 – 29 January 1974), better known as H. E. Bates, was an English writer of novels and short stories. His best-known works include Love for Lydia, The Darling Buds of May and My Uncle Silas.

== Early life ==
Herbert Ernest Bates was born on 16 May 1905 in Rushden, Northamptonshire, and educated at Kettering Grammar School. After school, he worked as a reporter and a warehouse clerk.

== Career ==
Bates's best-known works are set in the English countryside, particularly the Midlands including his native Northamptonshire and the 'Garden of England', Kent, the setting for The Darling Buds of May. Bates was partial to taking long walks around the Northamptonshire countryside, which often provided the inspiration for his stories. His love for the countryside is exemplified in two volumes of essays, Through the Woods and Down the River; both have been reprinted numerous times. Several of Bates's works, such The Bride Comes to Evensford and Love for Lydia, are set in the fictional town of Evensford, which is based on Bates's hometown, Rushden.

Bates discarded his first novel, written when he was in his late teenage years, but his second, and the first to be published, The Two Sisters, was inspired by one of his midnight walks, which took him to the small village of Farndish. There, late at night, he saw a light burning in a cottage window which triggered the story. He was working briefly for the local newspaper in Wellingborough, a job which he hated, and then later at a local shoe-making warehouse, where he had time to write; in fact the whole of this first novel was written there. This was sent to, and rejected by, eight or nine publishers until Jonathan Cape accepted it on the advice of its respected reader, Edward Garnett. Bates was then twenty years old. More novels, collections of short stories, essays, and articles followed, but did not pay well.

=== World War II short stories ===
During World War II, he was commissioned as an officer in the Royal Air Force, solely to write short stories. The Air Ministry realised that it might create more favourable public sentiment by emphasizing stories about the people fighting the war, rather than facts. The stories were published originally in the News Chronicle with the pseudonym "Flying Officer X". Later they were published in book form as The Greatest People in the World and Other Stories and How Sleep the Brave and Other Stories. His first financial success was Fair Stood the Wind for France. After a posting to the Far East, this was followed by two novels about Burma, The Purple Plain in 1947 and The Jacaranda Tree (published in 1949), and one set in India, The Scarlet Sword (published in 1950).

He was also commissioned by the Air Ministry to write The Battle of the Flying Bomb, but because of various disagreements within the government, it was cancelled, and then publication was banned for 30 years. It was published during 1994 with the title Flying Bombs over England. Another commission which has still to be published is Night Interception Battle concerning the difficulty of tracking enemy aircraft at night.

=== Post-war work ===
Other novels followed after the war; he averaged about one novel and a collection of short stories a year, which was considered very productive at the time. These included The Feast of July and Love for Lydia. His most popular creation was the Larkin family in The Darling Buds of May. Pop Larkin and his family were inspired by a person seen in a local shop in Kent by Bates and his family when on holiday. The man (probably Wiltshire trader William Dell, also on holiday) had a huge wad of rubber-banded bank notes and proceeded to treat his trailer load of children with Easter eggs and ice creams. Other characters were modelled on friends and acquaintances of Bates, such as Iris Snow (a parody of Iris Murdoch) and the Brigadier who was modelled on the father of John Bayley, Murdoch's husband.

The television adaptation, produced after his death by his son Richard and based on these stories, was a tremendous success. It is also the source of the American movie The Mating Game. The My Uncle Silas stories were also made into a UK television series from 2000 to 2003. Many other stories were adapted to TV and others to movies, the most renowned being The Purple Plain in 1954 and The Triple Echo; Bates also worked on other movie scripts. In 2020 ITV commissioned a new television series of The Darling Buds of May, with the title The Larkins, starring Bradley Walsh, Joanna Scanlan, Sabrina Bartlett and Tok Stephen. The first episode aired in October 2021.

== Personal life ==
In 1931, he married Madge Cox, who lived two streets away from him in his native Rushden. They moved to the village of Little Chart in Kent and bought an old granary and this together with an acre of garden they converted into a home. Bates was a keen and knowledgeable gardener who wrote many books on flowers. The Granary remained their home for the whole of their married life.

They had two sons and two daughters. One son, Jonathan Bates, was nominated for an Academy Award for his sound work on the 1982 movie Gandhi. Another, Richard, became a television producer. Bates's granddaughter, Victoria Wicks, is an actress and script consultant.

== Death and honours ==
In 1973, he was appointed a Commander of the Order of the British Empire (CBE).

Bates died of kidney failure on 29 January 1974 in Canterbury, Kent, aged 68. A prolific and successful author, his greatest success was posthumous, with the television adaptations of his stories The Darling Buds of May and its sequels as well as adaptations of My Uncle Silas, A Moment in Time, Fair Stood the Wind for France and Love for Lydia. In his home town of Rushden, Bates has a road named after him, leading to the leisure centre. His archive is held at the Harry Ransom Center at the University of Texas at Austin. After Bates's death Madge moved to a bungalow, which had originally been a cow byre, next to the Granary. She died in 2004 at the age of 95.

== Bibliography ==
=== Novels ===
- The Two Sisters (1926)
- Catherine Foster (1929)
- Charlotte's Row (1931)
- The Fallow Land (1932)
- The Poacher (1935)
- A House of Women (1936)
- Spella Ho (1938)
- Fair Stood the Wind for France (1944)
- The Cruise of the Breadwinner (1946)
- The Purple Plain (1947)
- Dear Life (1949)
- The Jacaranda Tree (1949)
- The Scarlet Sword (1950)
- The Grass God (1951)
- Love for Lydia (1952)
- The Feast of July (1954)
- The Sleepless Moon (1956)
- A Crown of Wild Myrtle (1962)
- A Moment in Time (1964)
- The Distant Horns of Summer (1967)
- The Triple Echo (1970)

==== Pop Larkin series ====
- The Darling Buds of May (1958)
- A Breath of French Air (1959)
- When the Green Woods Laugh (1960)
- Oh! To be in England (1963)
- A Little of What You Fancy (1970)

=== Short stories ===
- The Seekers (1926)
- The Spring Song and in View of the Fact That (1927)
- Day's End (1928)
- Alexander (1929)
- The Tree (1930)
- The Hessian Prisoner (1930)
- A Threshing Day for Esther (1930)
- Charlotte Esmond (1930) Republished as Mrs Esmond's Life (1931)
- A German Idyll (1932)
- Sally Go Round the Moon (1932)
- The Black Boxer (1932)
- The Story Without an End (1932)
- The House with the Apricot (1933)
- Time (1933)
- The Lily (1933)
- The Woman who had Imagination (1934)
- The Duet (1935)
- The Mill (1935)
- The Ox (1939)
- I Am Not Myself (1939)
- The Beauty of the Dead (1940)
- The Bride Comes to Evensford (1943)
- Colonel Julien (1951)
- The Delicate Nature (1953)
- Dulcima (1953)
- The Nature of Love (1953)
- The Daffodil Sky (1955)
- Summer in Salander (1955)
- The Grapes of Paradise (1956)
- The Queen of Spain Fritillary (1956)
- Death of a Huntsman (1957)
- A Great Day for Bonzo (1957)
- A Month by the Lake (1957)
- Night Run to the West (1957)
- A Prospect of Orchards (1957)
- The White Wind (1957)
- An Aspidistra in Babylon (1959)
- The Watercress Girl (1959)
- Mr Featherstone Takes a Ride (1961)
- Now Sleeps the Crimson Petal (1961)
- The Day of the Tortoise (1961)
- The Ring of Truth (1961)
- The Quiet Girl (1962)
- The World is Too Much With Us (1962)
- The Fabulous Mrs V (1964)
- The Simple Life (1967)
- The Chords of Youth (1968)
- The Four Beauties (1968)
- The White Admiral (1968)
- The Dam (1971)
- The Man Who Loved Squirrels (1971)
- The Song of the Wren (1972)
- The Yellow Meads of Asphodel (1976)

=== Short story collections ===
- Day's End and Other Stories (1928)
- Seven Tales and Alexander (1929)
- The Black Boxer Tales (1932)
- The Woman Who Had Imagination and Other Stories (1934)
- Thirty Tales (1934)
- Cut and Come Again (1935)
- Something Short and Sweet (1937)
- Country Tales (1938)
- The Flying Goat (1939)
- The Beauty of the Dead and Other Stories (1940)
- Thirty-One Selected Tales (1947)
- The Bride Comes to Evensford and Other Tales (1949)
- Colonel Julian and Other Stories (1951)
- Twenty Tales (1951)
- Selected Short Stories of H.E. Bates (1951)
- The Daffodil Sky (1955)
- Selected Stories (1957)
- The Watercress Girl (1959)
- An Aspidistra in Babylon (1960)
- Now Sleeps the Crimson Petal and Other Stories (1961)
- The Golden Oriole (1962)
- Seven by Five (1963)
- The Fabulous Mrs V (1964)
- The Wedding Party (1965)
- The Wild Cherry Tree (1968)
- The Four Beauties (1968)
- The Song of the Wren (1972)
- The Good Corn and other Stories (1974)
- A Party for the Girls (1988)
- Elephant’s Nest in a Rhubarb Tree & Other Stories (1989)
- Love in a Wych Elm and Other Stories (2009)

=== Novels and short stories collection ===
- The Best of H.E. Bates (1980)

==== Uncle Silas series ====
- My Uncle Silas (1939)
- Sugar for the Horse (1957)

==== Flying Officer X series ====
- The Greatest People in the World and Other Stories (1942)
- How Sleep the Brave and Other Stories (1943)
- Something in the Air (1944)
- The Stories of Flying Officer 'X' (1952)

=== Drama ===
- The Last Bread (1926) (a play in one act)
- The Day of Glory (1945) (a play in three acts)

=== Essays and non-fiction ===
- Flowers and Faces (1935)
- Through the Woods (1936)
- Down the River (1937)
- The Seasons & The Gardener (1940)
- In the Heart of the Country (1942)
- O More Than Happy Countryman (1943)
- War Pictures by British Artists (1943)
- Country Life (1943)
- There's Freedom in the Air (1944)
- The W.A.A.F in Action (1944)
- Flying Bombs over England (1945) Also published as "The Battle of the Flying Bomb."
- The Tinkers of Elstow (1946)
- The Country Heart (1949)
- Fawley Achievement (1951)
- The Country of White Clover (1952)
- Edward Garnett (1950)
- A Love of Flowers (1971)
- A Fountain of Flowers (1974)

=== Criticism ===
- The Modern Short Story (1942)

=== Books for children ===
- The Seekers (1926)
- The Seasons & The Gardener (1940)
- Achilles the Donkey (1962)
- Achilles and Diana (1963)
- Achilles and the Twins (1964)
- The White Admiral (1968)

=== Autobiography ===
- The Vanished World (1969)
- The Blossoming World (1971)
- The World in Ripeness (1972)

== References to H. E. Bates ==
- Bates's novel Love for Lydia served as an inspiration for Donna Lewis's 1996 hit song "I Love You Always Forever".
- Literary study of his works: Dennis Vannatta, H. E. Bates (Twayne's English Authors Series). Boston: Twayne Publishers, 1983. ISBN 0-8057-6844-0
- Bates's idyllic depiction of rural Britain is referred to by the character 'I' in cult British comedy Withnail & I
- His short story 'The Mill' featured as the extract in the first paper of the AQA English Language GCSE in 2019.

== Notes ==
- Eads, Peter, 1990, H.E.BATES, A Bibliographical Study, St. Paul's Bibliographies, Winchester, Hampshire, Omnigraphics, Detroit 1990 ISBN 0 906795 76 1
- * Eads, Peter, 2007, H.E.BATES, A Bibliographical Study, Oak Knoll Press & British Library, ISBN 978-1-58456-215-3 (Oak Knoll Press) ISBN 978-0-7123-5003-7 (The British Library)
- Eads, Peter, 1990, Give Them Their Life, The Poetry of H.E. Bates, Evensford Productions Ltd, ISBN 0 9516754 0 0
- Eads, Peter, 1995, The Life and Times of H.E.Bates, Northamptonshire County Council Libraries and Information Service, ISBN 0-905391-17-9
