= Donald Losby =

American actor

Donald A. Losby, Jr.
- Born: May 26, 1951 (age 75); San Francisco, California, U.S.
- Occupation: Actor
- Years active: 1950s–1970s
- Known for: Character roles in television series during the 1950s and 1960s

Donald A. Losby, Jr (born May 26, 1951 in San Francisco, California) is an American actor, known primarily for his many character roles in popular television during the 1950s and 1960s in programs such as The Adventures of Ozzie and Harriet, The Andy Griffith Show, The Twilight Zone, Wagon Train, Bonanza, Rawhide, Route 66, The Fugitive, Ben Casey, Lassie, My Three Sons, Gunsmoke (1966 “The Whispering Tree), Daniel Boone, Blue Light, Lost in Space ("Return from Outer Space"), and The Young Rebels, as well as a small number of movies, typically playing the role of someone's son or brother, as in The Mating Game with Debbie Reynolds.

== Filmography ==
Year	Title	Role
1957	Raintree County	Jim Shawnessy
1959	The Mating Game	Grant Larkin
1959	The Remarkable Mr. Pennypacker	Ben Pennypacker
1962	Tower of London	Young boy
1963	Critic's Choice	Godfrey Von Hagedorn
1964	Your Cheatin' Heart	Young Hank Williams
1968	How Sweet It Is!	Davey Henderson

== Trivia ==
- In 1963, he co-starred in an unsold pilot for a proposed comedy series called Grand Slam, about a sports columnist (played by Murray Hamilton) who can not help getting involved with other people's problems.
- His last acting role was in support of the short-lived 1970 television show Headmaster, a vehicle for Andy Griffith that also co-starred Jerry Van Dyke.
