= The Triple Echo (novella) =

1970 novella by H. E. Bates

The Triple Echo (novel)
- First edition
- Author: H. E. Bates
- Illustrator: Ron Clarke
- Language: English
- Publisher: Michael Joseph (UK)
- Publication date: 1970
- Publication place: United Kingdom
- Media type: Print
- Pages: 79
- ISBN: 0-7181-0814-0

The Triple Echo is a 1970 novella written by English author H. E. Bates. Set during the early years of World War II the story describes the strange relationship that develops between a young army deserter and a married woman struggling to run a farm alone in the absence of her P.O.W. husband. Bates later said he began working on the story in 1943 but encountered a stumbling block over a character, later removed, and was unable to make any progress with the project until 1968. Although first published in book form in 1970, the complete story was originally published in the Daily Telegraph magazine in instalments during December 1969. The book was filmed in 1972.

== Plot Introduction ==
In the early years of World War II Alice Charlesworth is running a farm single-handed in the absence of her husband who is incarcerated in a Japanese P.O.W. camp. When she encounters Barton, a young deserter, on her land she gladly accepts him into her home and her bed. Although Barton eases Alice's loneliness and her frustrations, they do not become friends and there is always some uneasiness between them, perhaps owing to the difference in their ages or perhaps to Barton's weak and frivolous nature. To hide the young man from detection Alice dresses him in her own clothes and tells people that he is her sister. The drama reaches a shocking conclusion when army MPs arrive searching for the deserter and one of them is attracted to Barton, believing him to be a woman.

== Adaptation ==
It was adapted into a film in 1972, The Triple Echo, directed by Michael Apted and starring Glenda Jackson, Oliver Reed and Brian Deacon.
