= The Two Sisters (novel) =

1926 novel by H. E. Bates

- First edition (UK)
- Author: H. E. Bates
- Language: English
- Publisher: Jonathan Cape (UK); Viking Press (US)
- Publication date: 1926
- Publication place: United Kingdom
- Media type: Print & Audio
- Pages: 224

The Two Sisters was the first novel published by English author H. E. Bates in 1926.

== Background ==
It was his first novel, though he had published a one-act play The Last Bread earlier that year. The book was inspired by one of his midnight walks, which took him to the small village of Farndish in Bedfordshire. There, late at night, he saw a light burning in a cottage window and it was this that triggered the story.

It was written when Bates was only 19 living in Rushden and working as a warehouse clerk. It was rejected by nine publishers before being accepted by Jonathan Cape at the recommendation of Edward Garnett, who also wrote an introduction to the novel

== Plot introduction ==
Jenny and her younger sister Tessie live in an isolated farmhouse with their recently widowed and tyrannical father Jacob and their two brothers Jim and Luke. Tessie seeks escape in the local dancehall. Jenny stays at home. Then an unexpected visitor Michael Winter breaks into their quiet lives; both sisters falling in love with him.
