= The Triple Echo =

1972 British film by Michael Apted

- Original poster
- Directed by: Michael Apted
- Written by: Robin Chapman
- Based on: The Triple Echo by H.E. Bates
- Produced by: Graham Cottle
- Starring: Glenda Jackson; Oliver Reed; Brian Deacon; Anthony May; Gavin Richards
- Cinematography: John Coquillon
- Edited by: Barrie Vince
- Music by: Marc Wilkinson
- Production companies: Hemdale Film Corporation; Senta Productions
- Distributed by: Hemdale
- Release date: 17 November 1972
- Running time: 94 minutes
- Country: United Kingdom
- Language: English

The Triple Echo (U.S title: Soldier in Skirts) is a 1972 British drama film directed by Michael Apted starring Glenda Jackson, Brian Deacon and Oliver Reed, and based on the 1970 novella by H.E. Bates. It was shot in Wiltshire.

== Plot ==
In England during World War II, Alice, a woman running a farm in the countryside, discovers a young man named Barton roaming the fields. He helps around the farm and the two become friends, then lovers. Barton decides to desert the army. Alice offers him refuge in exchange for help running the farm in the absence of her husband, who has been taken prisoner by the Japanese. Barton puts Alice's ailing dog out of its misery by shooting it with her husband's shotgun.

When the military police begin to search for Barton, he must take measures to avoid being caught, so Alice helps him form the disguise of a woman, who she says is her sister Jill. However, Barton tells people that his name is Cathy. A sergeant soon begins to take a liking to "Cathy". As Christmas approaches, the sergeant returns to invite Alice and Cathy to a Christmas party. Alice declines, but Barton, wanting to get out and have some fun, accepts the offer. Alice warns him against doing so.

During the party, the sergeant and another soldier take Cathy and a young woman into a back room to have sex, but when Jill forces the sergeant away he realises that Cathy is really a man. Barton escapes, and the military police follow and hunt him near to the farm house where Alice is waiting. Because Alice does not want Barton to suffer at the hands of the soldiers, she shoots him dead with her husband's shotgun.

== Cast ==
- Glenda Jackson as Alice Charlesworth
- Oliver Reed as sergeant
- Brian Deacon as Barton
- Anthony May as subaltern
- Gavin Richards as Stan
- Jenny Lee-Wright as Christine
- Kenneth Colley as Provost Corporal
- Daphne Heard as shopkeeper
- Zelah Clarke as first girl
- Colin Rix as compere
- Ioan Meredith as guard
- Sid Hill as sergeant reading newspaper

== Novella ==
The film was based on a novella by H.E. Bates, which he started writing in 1968 although he had had the idea since World War Two. The novella was published in 1970. The Guardian said it had "a persistent smell of fabrication right through".

== Production ==
In January 1971 it was reported Bryan Forbes would write, produce and direct a version of the novella for EMI Films. It would star Vanessa Redgrave, Jenny Agutter and Peter McEnery, and start filming in March. However in March 1971 Forbes quit as head of EMI Films.

In March 1972 it was announced that the film version would star Glenda Jackson and Oliver Reed, reuniting them after their success in Women in Love. It was an early movie from Hemdale. Director Michael Apted later said the only reason he could make the film "was Glenda was available and was willing to appear for a much smaller than usual fee."

In 1973 Jackson said she was "fairly happy" with the film.

== Reception ==
The Monthly Film Bulletin wrote: "Michael Apted has directed more than fifty television plays, and his first feature film, The Triple Echo, could well have been another. Indeed it would have fitted very well into the recent Country Matters series, though the extra time and the freedom from "natural breaks" do permit a more leisurely development of background and atmosphere. The opening establishes place, time and character with effortless economy, but with the sort of deliberate tempo exactly suited to the subject. The fertile valley; the remote farmhouse; the solitary woman striding over the fields, gun in hand; her hostile reaction to a stranger and the easy change to friendliness and hospitality when she meets a sympathetic response: all these – in a series of easy flowing pictures and half a dozen lines of dialogue – create an atmosphere that leads perfectly into the relationship that is to follow. This relationship is the heart of the film, and the catalytic function of the Sergeant with his mildy implausible goingson is presumably part of the plot mechanics of Bates' original story. Unfortunately, the dramatic form exposes the machinery rather too obviously, and the tragic climax comes across with a melodramatic flourish that has no part in such a delicately imagined and tactfully executed little anecdote. Yet it is handled with enough discretion not to destroy sys conviction of the rest ole whose real interest – despite sexual emphasis of distributors' publicity – lies in a subtle and perceptively realised relationship in which sex is only one element. Alice and Barton are initially as much attracted by their common way of life as by their physical needs. And the change which occurs when he too readily accepts the dependent role she has forced on him has more to do with her domineering nature and with feelings of guilt than with any sexual ambiguities in either of them. Glenda Jackson and Brian Deacon follow the convolutions of their changing roles with tact and intelligence, while Oliver Reed contributes a horribly convincing picture of "the coarse, brutal, almost sub-human Sergeant."

The Radio Times Guide to Films gave the film 3/5 stars, writing: "Adapted from a novel by H.E. Bates and set on a remote farm in 1942, this unlikely drama might have provoked a few unintentional smirks if it hadn't been so sensitively played by Glenda Jackson and Brian Deacon. Michael Apted's careful direction makes the ruse of disguising deserter Deacon as Jackson's sister seem almost credible, while his recreation of the tranquil wartime countryside makes the abrupt intrusion of vulgar sergeant Oliver Reed all the more foreboding."

The Guardian called it "nothing very special... but at least it's a good story, well told." The same paper later said the movie "got some good critical reaction but did nothing at the box office."

On the review aggregator website Rotten Tomatoes, 60% of 5 critics' reviews are positive, with an average rating of 5.0/10.

== Awards ==
Michael Apted was nominated for a Golden Prize Award at the 8th Moscow International Film Festival in 1973. (The film had been banned from the festival originally but this was lifted after a small cut was made to a sex scene.)

== Home media ==
The Triple Echo was released on VHS in the United States in 1985 Paragon Video Productions.

The film has never been made available on DVD format in the United Kingdom or United States. It was however released in Germany as Desertiert:Der Kampf ums Überleben, on 1 December 2016 from Medien GmbH distribution. The film has also been released in Spain as La Máscara y la Piel.

On 10 January 2019, it was announced that The Triple Echo would be made available on Blu-ray from Powerhouse films subsidiary, Indicator. It features a new 2K restoration of the film as well as original Mono audio. A number of new special features are included and limited edition exclusive booklet with the first pressing. The set was released on 25 March 2019.
