= Farndish =

Village in Bedfordshire, England

Coordinates: 52.26190°N 0.64610°W

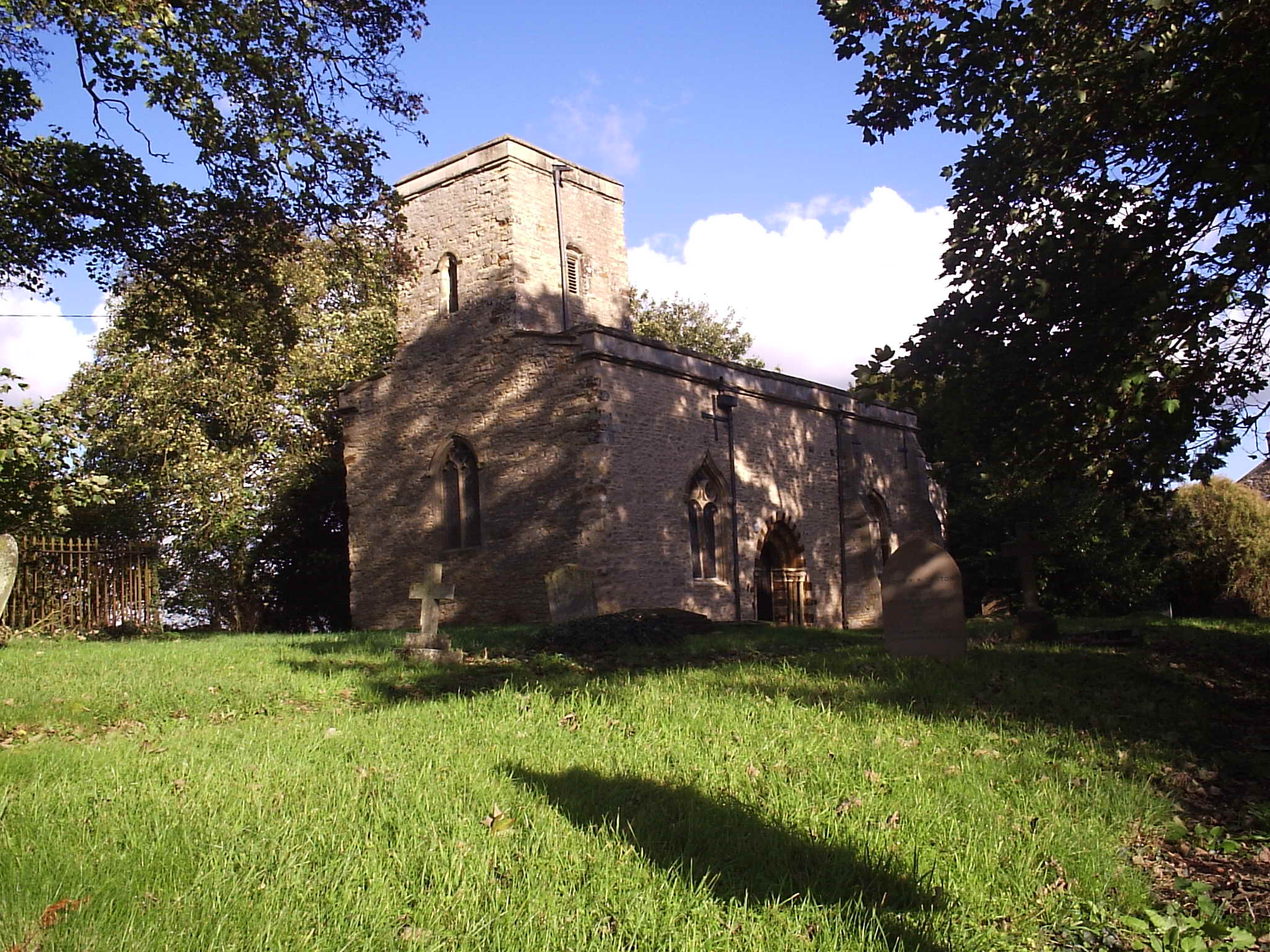
- Farndish church

- Location within Bedfordshire
- OS grid reference: SP925635
- Civil parish: Podington
- Unitary authority: Bedford
- Ceremonial county: Bedfordshire
- Region: East
- Country: England
- Sovereign state: United Kingdom
- Post town: Wellingborough
- Postcode district: NN29
- Dialling code: 01933
- Police: Bedfordshire
- Fire: Bedfordshire
- Ambulance: East of England
- UK Parliament: North Bedfordshire

Farndish is a village in the civil parish of Podington, in the Bedford borough of Bedfordshire, England. It is located about 500 metres (550 yd) east of the county boundary with Northamptonshire. The village is near the Northamptonshire villages of Irchester and Wollaston and the Bedfordshire village of Wymington.

== History ==
The name Farndish means fern-clad pasture. Farndish was mentioned in the Domesday Survey as 'Fernadis'.

According to Samuel Lewis in 1848:

Farndish is a parish in the Hundred of Willey, and the county of Bedford, 4½ miles (S.W. by S.) from Higham-Ferrers, containing 73 inhabitants. The church living is a rectory, in the archdeaconry of Bedford, and diocese of Lincoln, rated in the king's books at £10. C. Chester, Esq. was patron in 1784.

Rev. Augustus Orlebar, considered to have been the basis of the character Tom Brown in Thomas Hughes' Tom Brown's School Days, was rector of Farndish from 1852 to 1858.

Farndish was an ancient parish, which historically straddled the counties of Bedfordshire and Northamptonshire. In 1884 the parish was abolished and merged with the neighbouring parish of Podington. The parts of the old parish of Farndish which had been in Northamptonshire were transferred to Bedfordshire at the same time. At the 1881 census (the last before the abolition of the parish), Farndish had a population of 72.

The local author H. E. Bates would often come through the village on his nocturnal walks in the 1920s and 1930s. It was on one of the night walks that he got the inspiration for his first novel, The Two Sisters, when he saw a light burning in a cottage window.

In 1937 The Times reported the plans being made in Farndish to mark the celebrations for the Coronation of King George VI and Queen Elizabeth – "a fine example of how England's villages may make this a memorable day in the lives of their people". On Coronation Day each of the twelve houses in the village was to be decorated to represent a different part of the British Empire. In the morning there would be a service in the parish church, for which the parson would come from Podington. "Then", according to The Times, "the population of 45 will adjourn to the village hall to drink the health of the King in ale. Port wine will be supplied to those who are teetotallers, in accordance with a well-known English custom." In the afternoon there were to be sports and games, and in the evening the villagers would return to the village hall for a fancy-dress dance and whist drive.

== The church ==
The church of St Michaels & All Angels appears to have been built sometime between 1180 and 1210. The masonry used to build the church is mainly local rubble along with some rust-coloured ironstone; the window dressings are of local limestone.

The tower was added in the 15th century within the nave and houses three bells:

- Treble – cast by Christopher Grave – 1663
- Second – cast by James Keene – 1625
- Tenor – cast by Newcombe – 1597

The font dates to circa 1200 and is crowned by a 17th-century wooden cover – this is itself covered in 19th-century inscriptions and patterns. The very low pitched roof still has its original 15th-century timberwork.

According to Kelly's Directory the church is "a small building of stone, in the Transitional, Early English and later styles, consisting of chancel, nave and a low western tower rising within the nave, and containing 3 bells : the south doorway is a rich example of the Transitional Norman style : a beautiful stained east window was presented by the late Mr. W. H. S. Adcock, of this village, one on the south side by the Rev. Greville Chester, late rector, and there are several other stained windows : in the chancel is a small brass to John Johnston, rector (ob. 1625), being then nearly 100 years old; and there are also inscriptions to the Clark, Adcock and Alderman families : the church plate includes an ancient chalice:there are 69 sittings. The register dates from the year 1587."

- The parish records for the church and village are available on microfiche for the period 1550–1812 from the Bedfordshire Family History Society.
- Since 1970, the Church has not been used for regular worship but remains consecrated; since 1974 it has been opened and cared for by The Churches Conservation Trust and the donations of visitors. Repairs to the Church have been carried out for the fund by the Bedford architect Victor Farrar.
- There is a healthy population of bats living in the belfry of the church.
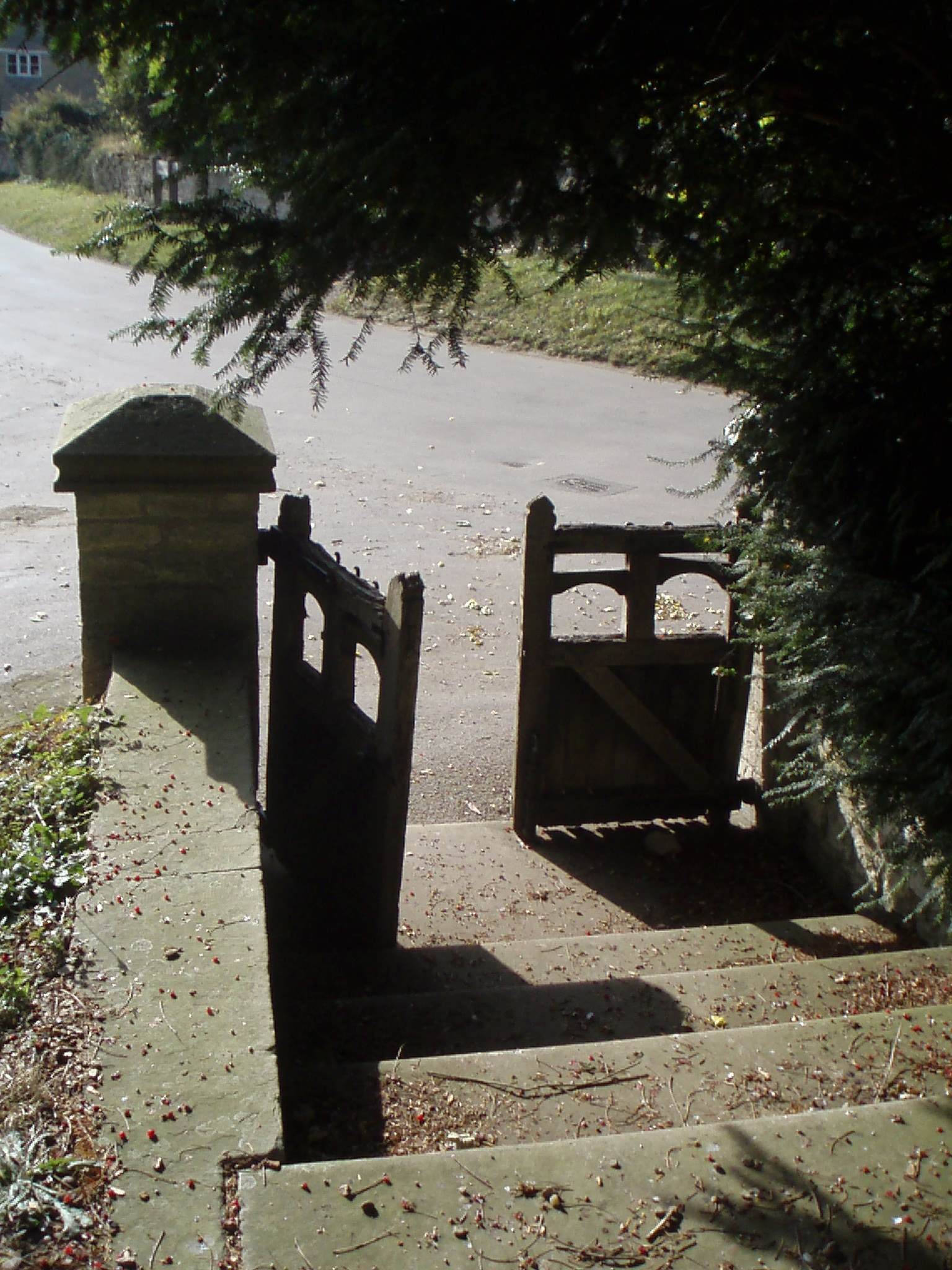
The church gates in the autumn sun

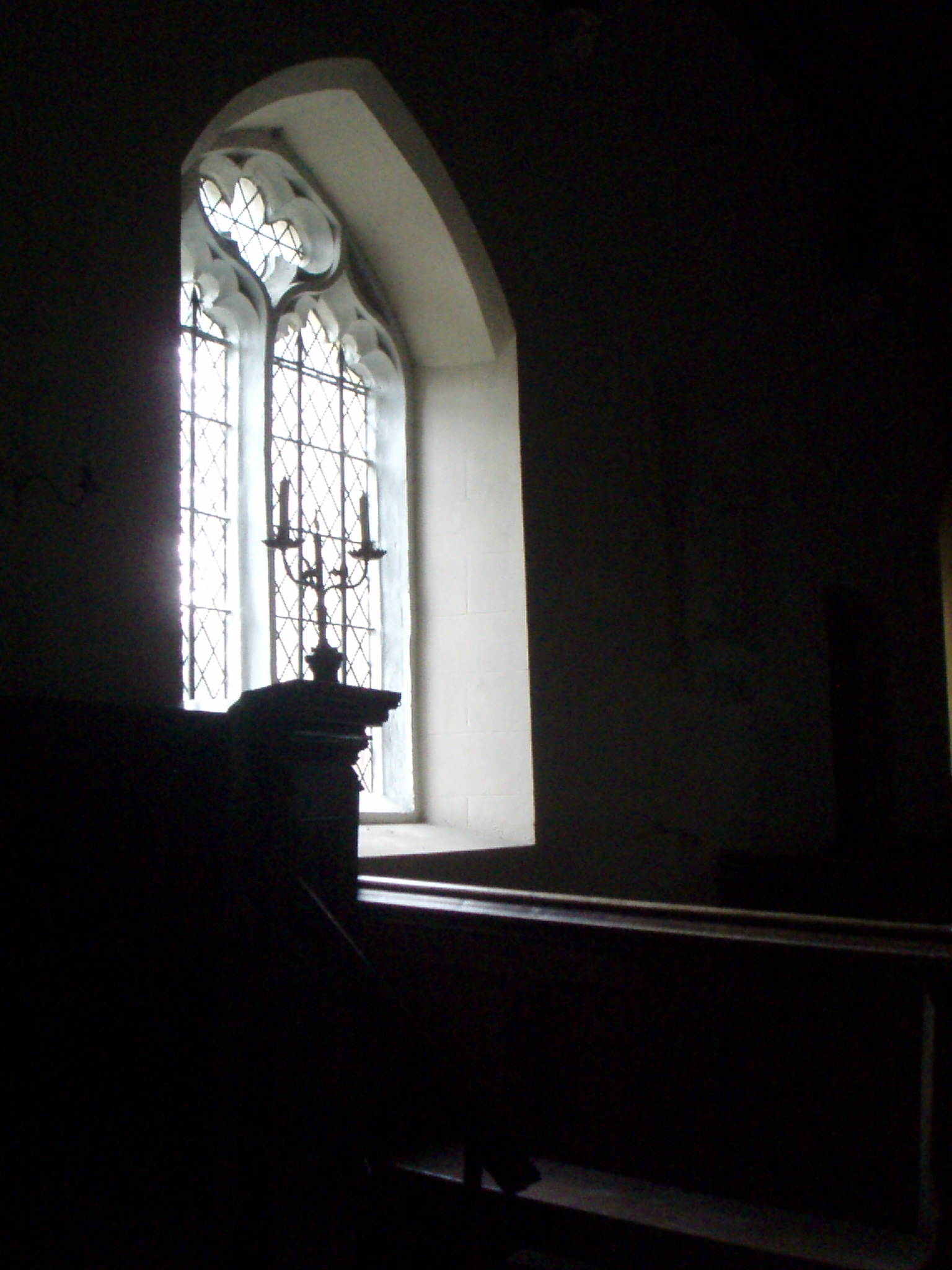
The church window in the half light

== Sources ==
- Foster, J. (1891) "Orlebar, Augustus", Alumni Oxonienses, Parker and Company.
