= Love for Lydia =

1952 novel by H. E. Bates

- First edition Cover art by James Broom-Lynne
- Author: H. E. Bates
- Language: English
- Publisher: Little Brown
- Publication date: 1952 (UK)
- Publication place: United Kingdom
- Media type: Print (Hardcover)

Love for Lydia is a semi-autobiographical novel written by British author H. E. Bates, first published in 1952. It is set in the fictional town of Evensford, based on Bates's hometown Rushden in Northamptonshire, England.

== Plot ==
Lydia Aspen, a seemingly shy girl from a wealthy but isolated background, is encouraged by her aunts, her new carers, to discover the delights of growing up. They entrust her education to Mr Richardson, the young apprentice for Evensford's local newspaper, who is sent to their house to "get a story" about the recent death of Lydia's father.

Richardson's access to the Aspens is unusual, as they are rarely seen by anyone from the town and hide behind their stone walls and perimeter of trees; introducing Lydia to the town's inhabitants gives Richardson a great sense of pride. Visiting the Aspen estate also allows Richardson the chance to escape from the great engulfing vacuum of Evensford, with its endless stretch of factory roofs and back alleys.

As Lydia and Richardson spend more time together, he realises that his initial concept of Lydia was wrong, that she is far from being shy, and is often impetuous and demanding and enjoys captivating the young men who become her companions. Richardson soon discovers that his promise to love her, no matter what she does to him, is going to push him beyond the pain and feelings he thinks he is capable of experiencing.

== Reception ==
A 1952 book review by Kirkus Reviews called the book "a certain latter day-disenchantment for a return to a lost youth, and a first love for Lydia, whose capricious charms were to destroy as well as affect in a fickle, facile pursuit" and summarized: "A moment in time—and feeling, recaptured with a poignant detachment and regret, with however—none of the external drama of earlier novels."

== Adaptations ==
Love for Lydia was adapted into a 13-part serial by London Weekend Television, first broadcast in 1977. It featured several actors in performances which were early in their television careers, including Christopher Blake, Mel Martin, Christopher Hancock, Peter Davison, Jeremy Irons, Ralph Arliss and Sherrie Hewson. It also featured Rachel Kempson, Beatrix Lehmann and Michael Aldridge, as Lydia's eccentric relations, plus David Ryall and Sam Kydd.

A two-part dramatisation with Tim Pigott-Smith as the narrator was first broadcast by BBC Radio 4 in 2004.
