= Listed buildings in Little Chart =

Historic structures in Kent, England

Little Chart is a village and civil parish in the Borough of Ashford of Kent, England. It contains one grade II* and 40 grade II listed buildings that are recorded in the National Heritage List for England.

This list is based on the information retrieved online from Historic England.

== Key ==
Grade	Criteria
I	Buildings that are of exceptional interest
II*	Particularly important buildings of more than special interest
II	Buildings that are of special interest

== Listing ==
Name	Grade	Location	Type	Completed (Note: The date given is the date used by Historic England as significant for the initial building or that of an important part in the structure's description.)	Date designated	Grid ref. (Note: The grid reference is based on the British national grid reference system, sometimes known as OSGB36, used by the Ordnance Survey.) Geo-coordinates	Notes	Entry number (Note: The "List Entry Number" is a unique number assigned to each listed building and scheduled monument by Historic England.)	Image	Wikidata
Boundary Wall to Former Kitchen Garden of Calehill House	II	Calehill House			10 October 1980	TQ9426847061; 51°11′23″N 0°46′43″E		1071431	Upload Photo	Q26326590
Calehill Cottage	II	Calehill Park			10 October 1980	TQ9421747113; 51°11′25″N 0°46′41″E		1071432	Upload Photo	Q26326591
Calehill House	II*	Calehill Park			14 February 1967	TQ9416447142; 51°11′26″N 0°46′38″E		1071434	Upload Photo	Q17556217
Fountain Cottage	II	Calehill Park			10 October 1980	TQ9408247169; 51°11′27″N 0°46′34″E		1362651	Upload Photo	Q26644526
Keepers Cottages	II	Calehill Park			10 October 1980	TQ9464346874; 51°11′17″N 0°47′02″E		1071436	Upload Photo	Q26326595
Roman Catholic Chapel	II	Calehill Park			26 February 1951	TQ9432346939; 51°11′19″N 0°46′46″E		1071430	Upload Photo	Q26326588
Ruins of the Original Calehill House	II	Calehill Park			14 February 1967	TQ9415447047; 51°11′23″N 0°46′37″E		1071433	Upload Photo	Q26326593
The Dower House	II	Calehill Park			10 October 1980	TQ9411147193; 51°11′28″N 0°46′35″E		1071435	Upload Photo	Q26326594
Boundary Wall and Gate Piers to North and West of Surrenden Park	II	Hothfield Road			10 October 1980	TQ9450845829; 51°10′43″N 0°46′53″E		1071438	Upload Photo	Q26326599
Brownmill	II	Hothfield Road			10 October 1980	TQ9581545201; 51°10′21″N 0°47′59″E		1071439	Upload Photo	Q26326600
Dering Cottage and Laundry Cottage	II	Hothfield Road			10 October 1980	TQ9451445852; 51°10′44″N 0°46′54″E		1071437	Upload Photo	Q26326597
Gate Cottage Gatte House	II	Hothfield Road			10 October 1980	TQ9455345815; 51°10′42″N 0°46′55″E		1115142	Upload Photo	Q26408890
Orchard Cottage	II	Hothfield Road, Rooting Street			10 October 1980	TQ9536145498; 51°10′31″N 0°47′36″E		1362653	Upload Photo	Q26644528
Rooting Street Farmhouse	II	Hothfield Road, Rooting Street			10 October 1980	TQ9517845489; 51°10′31″N 0°47′27″E		1115145	Upload Photo	Q26408893
The Swan Inn and Former Stables	II	Hothfield Road			14 February 1967	TQ9438645904; 51°10′46″N 0°46′47″E		1362652	The Swan Inn and Former Stables More images	Q26644527
Barn to West of Coldham House	II	Little Chart Forstal			10 October 1980	TQ9519045783; 51°10′41″N 0°47′28″E		1071442	Upload Photo	Q26326604
Coldham House	II	Little Chart Forstal			10 October 1980	TQ9523345765; 51°10′40″N 0°47′30″E		1362655	Upload Photo	Q26644530
Forstal Cottage	II	Little Chart Forstal			10 October 1980	TQ9527545881; 51°10′44″N 0°47′33″E		1139001	Upload Photo	Q26431963
Forstal Farmhouse	II	Little Chart Forstal			14 February 1967	TQ9508045834; 51°10′42″N 0°47′23″E		1320570	Upload Photo	Q26606554
Forstal Gate	II	Little Chart Forstal			10 October 1980	TQ9533045834; 51°10′42″N 0°47′35″E		1329913	Upload Photo	Q26615098
Home Meadow	II	Little Chart Forstal			14 February 1967	TQ9530845889; 51°10′44″N 0°47′34″E		1071441	Upload Photo	Q26326603
Oasthouse to East of Coldham House	II	Little Chart Forstal			10 October 1980	TQ9527445775; 51°10′40″N 0°47′32″E		1138978	Upload Photo	Q26431945
Pond Cottages	II	1-3, Little Chart Forstal			10 October 1980	TQ9515245889; 51°10′44″N 0°47′26″E		1320573	Upload Photo	Q26606556
The Outlook	II	Little Chart Forstal			10 October 1980	TQ9523545897; 51°10′44″N 0°47′31″E		1071440	Upload Photo	Q26326601
Weatherboarded Barn to North of Forstal Farmhouse	II	Little Chart Forstsal			10 October 1980	TQ9507245870; 51°10′44″N 0°47′22″E		1362654	Upload Photo	Q26644529
Barn to South of Chart Court Farmhouse	II	Pluckley Road			10 October 1980	TQ9337046630; 51°11′10″N 0°45′56″E		1145821	Upload Photo	Q26438961
Oasthouse to West of Chart Court Farmhouse	II	Pluckley Road			10 October 1980	TQ9344246647; 51°11′11″N 0°46′00″E		1362656	Upload Photo	Q26644531
Ruins of Church of St Mary	II	Pluckley Road			14 February 1967	TQ9346046683; 51°11′12″N 0°46′01″E		1329709	Ruins of Church of St Mary More images	Q17650186
Swallow Mill Swallow Mill Farmhouse	II	Pluckley Road			14 February 1967	TQ9339046963; 51°11′21″N 0°45′58″E		1071443	Upload Photo	Q26326606
Appleyard	II	Rooting Lane			10 October 1980	TQ9457545014; 51°10′17″N 0°46′55″E		1318916	Upload Photo	Q26605025
Former Stables to North East of Rooting Manor	II	Rooting Lane			10 October 1980	TQ9460745090; 51°10′19″N 0°46′57″E		1071445	Upload Photo	Q26326608
Oasthouse to West of Rooting Manor	II	Rooting Lane			10 October 1980	TQ9452545075; 51°10′19″N 0°46′53″E		1362657	Upload Photo	Q26644532
Rooting Cottages and Barn to South East of Rooting Manor	II	1 and 2, Rooting Lane			10 October 1980	TQ9458445046; 51°10′18″N 0°46′56″E		1318915	Upload Photo	Q26605024
Rooting Manor	II	Rooting Lane			14 February 1967	TQ9455445085; 51°10′19″N 0°46′54″E		1145824	Upload Photo	Q26438965
Yew Tree Cottage	II	Rooting Lane, Rooting Street			10 October 1980	TQ9511645475; 51°10′31″N 0°47′24″E		1071444	Upload Photo	Q26326607
Ice House	II	Surrenden Dering			23 May 1994	TQ9446745723; 51°10′40″N 0°46′51″E		1275167	Upload Photo	Q26564774
Langley House White House	II	The Street			10 October 1980	TQ9433046096; 51°10′52″N 0°46′45″E		1071446	Upload Photo	Q26326610
Mill Cottage	II	The Street			14 February 1967	TQ9432046027; 51°10′50″N 0°46′44″E		1362659	Upload Photo	Q26644534
The Bank	II	1, The Street			17 September 1952	TQ9432246056; 51°10′51″N 0°46′44″E		1145832	Upload Photo	Q26438976
The Cottage	II	The Street			14 February 1967	TQ9435446086; 51°10′51″N 0°46′46″E		1145829	Upload Photo	Q26438971
The Nook	II	The Street			10 October 1980	TQ9435346096; 51°10′52″N 0°46′46″E		1362658	Upload Photo	Q26644533

== See also ==
- Grade I listed buildings in Kent
- Grade II* listed buildings in Kent

== Sources ==
- Newman, John (2012) [1969], Kent: West and the Weald, The Buildings of England, New Haven and London: Yale University Press, ISBN 978-0-300-18509-6
