= My Uncle Silas =

1939 book of short stories by H. E. Bates

- First edition cover
- Author: H. E. Bates
- Illustrator: Edward Ardizzone
- Language: English
- Published: 1939 Jonathan Cape
- Pages: 190

My Uncle Silas is a book of short stories about a bucolic elderly Bedfordshire man, written by H. E. Bates and illustrated by Edward Ardizzone.

== Inspiration ==
Bates's Uncle Silas figure, and many of the lineaments of his character, were based on a real person named Joseph Betts, the husband of H. E. Bates's maternal grandmother's sister Mary Ann. Betts lived in a village in the Ouse Valley, was born in the early 1840s, and lived to the early 1930s. The figure he portrays is Rabelaisian and robust, a true countryman of pithy and roguish character, simultaneously earthy and whimsical, crabbed and wicked, yet full of humour and "strong original devilishness."

Bates considered that, if anything, he had understated the true English rural character. The delightful stories and scenes were drawn from his own memories of a Northamptonshire childhood, from stories actually told by his great-uncle, or from a more general country lore of apocryphal legends such as any attentive child might be aware of. The boy (representing the author in childhood) enters into most of the stories, sometimes as a listener and sometimes a participant: his relationship to Silas and the old man's way of putting a slant on his stories for the boy's benefit are essential parts of the whole effect.

== Publication ==
The first collection of stories (My Uncle Silas) was published in 1939, though the first story (introducing the character), The Lily, had been published separately about six years earlier, and had been followed by The Wedding and The Death of Uncle Silas. In public correspondence to the author, the British and colonial public demanded the resurrection of Uncle Silas; and so a further 11 stories were written to complete the volume, illustrated by Edward Ardizzone. Various book-club editions and reprints followed.

In 1957 Michael Joseph Ltd of London published a further volume of 12 additional Uncle Silas stories, accompanied by 25 more Ardizzone drawings, under the title Sugar for the Horse.

A single Uncle Silas story, Loss of Pride was published in 1976 in the posthumous collection of Bates' short stories The Yellow Meads of Asphodel.

== Adaptations ==
Two series of the short stories were adapted for television. The first aired in 2001 and the second in 2003. They featured Albert Finney as Silas. The BBC also produced some radio adaptations.

== Sources ==
- H.E. Bates, 1939, My Uncle Silas (with author's preface: illustrated by Edward Ardizzone). (Jonathan Cape).
- H.E. Bates, 1957, Sugar for the Horse (illustrated by Edward Ardizzone). (Michael Joseph, London).
