= The Scarlet Sword =

English Novel about Kashmir Conflict

The Scarlet Sword is an English novel by H. E. Bates published in 1950. The novel was serialised in John Bull from 19 August to 7 October 1950. Like other partition novels, the narrative deals with the battle between India and Pakistan over Kashmir, especially the historical event of the sacking of St. Joseph's Convent in Baramulla, Jammu and Kashmir, transpiring in the latter part of October 1947. This incident was carried out by a group of pro-Pakistan Afridi and Pathan tribal soldiers. The novel includes a diverse ensemble of characters, encompassing two clergy members, a journalist, a Hindu dancer, a retired Colonel and his spouse, a youthful Englishwoman along with her mother, a nurse, tribal soldiers, and a multitude of individuals representing different facets of religious, medical, and military backgrounds.

== Synopsis ==
According to Andrew Whitehead in his A Mission in Kashmir (2007), the novel was inspired by Sydney Smith's report on Kashmir Incident in The Daily Voyage. The narrative concerns the fate of a modest community in the tumultuous onset of conflict lasting ten days, during which both Hindu residents and British individuals sought sanctuary within the confines of the nearby Catholic Mission. The survival and preservation of their sanity in the face of adversity hinged on the valor of Father Simpson. The Atlantic review summarises the plot of the novel as follows:

In the eruption following the Partition of India, a band of murderous Pathans attacks an isolated Catholic Mission harboring some sixty people — two priests, the nuns, Hindu refugees, a British war correspondent, a British colonel and his wife, a young English girl and her mother, a nurse from Glasgow, and a dancer from the brothels of Bombay. The action, which lasts ten days, is one searing flash of violence in which the characters are brilliantly illumined.

— The Atlantic

Hindu characters that play a pivotal role in the novel include the Bombay prostitute, Kaushalya. Towards the conclusion of the novel, it is implied that she is raped by two Pathans. The novel has sub-plots such as the affair between the "war-weary British journalist", a British Foreign Correspondent Crane and Julia Maxted. Towards the end, a resolution is provided as the Indian Army drive off the tribal soldiers.

== Criticism ==
Andrew Whitehead criticises the lack of context in the novel with almost no non-Europeans, especially Kashmiri characters, given enough narrative space, let alone giving them distinct identities and names.

The novel has also been criticised for using a traditional trope of a "familiar group of Occidentals in their little island" undergoing a roller-coaster of emotions and experiences. Moreover, the novel's preoccupation with the depiction of the inscrutable interior life of the characters, with all the religious and missionary overtones, makes the narrative less interesting.
