= A Breath of French Air =

1959 novel

- First Edition
- Author: H. E. Bates
- Language: English
- Genre: Comedy
- Publisher: Michael Joseph; Little, Brown (US)
- Publication date: 1959
- Publication place: United Kingdom
- Media type: Print
- Preceded by: The Darling Buds of May
- Followed by: When the Green Woods Laugh

A Breath of French Air is a 1959 comedy novel by the British writer H. E. Bates. It is the sequel to his popular 1958 novel The Darling Buds of May about a family living in the Kent countryside. The Larkins decide to take their first ever foreign holiday and travel to France, taking their Rolls-Royce with them. However they at first find France disconcertingly unlikable, including the bad weather.

In 1991 it was adapted into two episodes of the ITV television series The Darling Buds of May featuring David Jason and Catherine Zeta-Jones.

== Bibliography ==
- Baldwin, Dean R. H.E. Bates: A Literary Life. Susquehanna University Press, 1987.
- Head, Dominic. Modernity and the English Rural Novel. Cambridge University Press, 2017.
- Hillier, Bevis. The Decorative Arts of the Forties and Fifties Austerity Binge. C. N. Potter, 1975.
- Jacob, Merle & Apple, Hope. To be Continued: An Annotated Guide to Sequels. Greenwood Publishing Group, 2000.
