= Sabrina Bartlett =

English actress (born 1991)

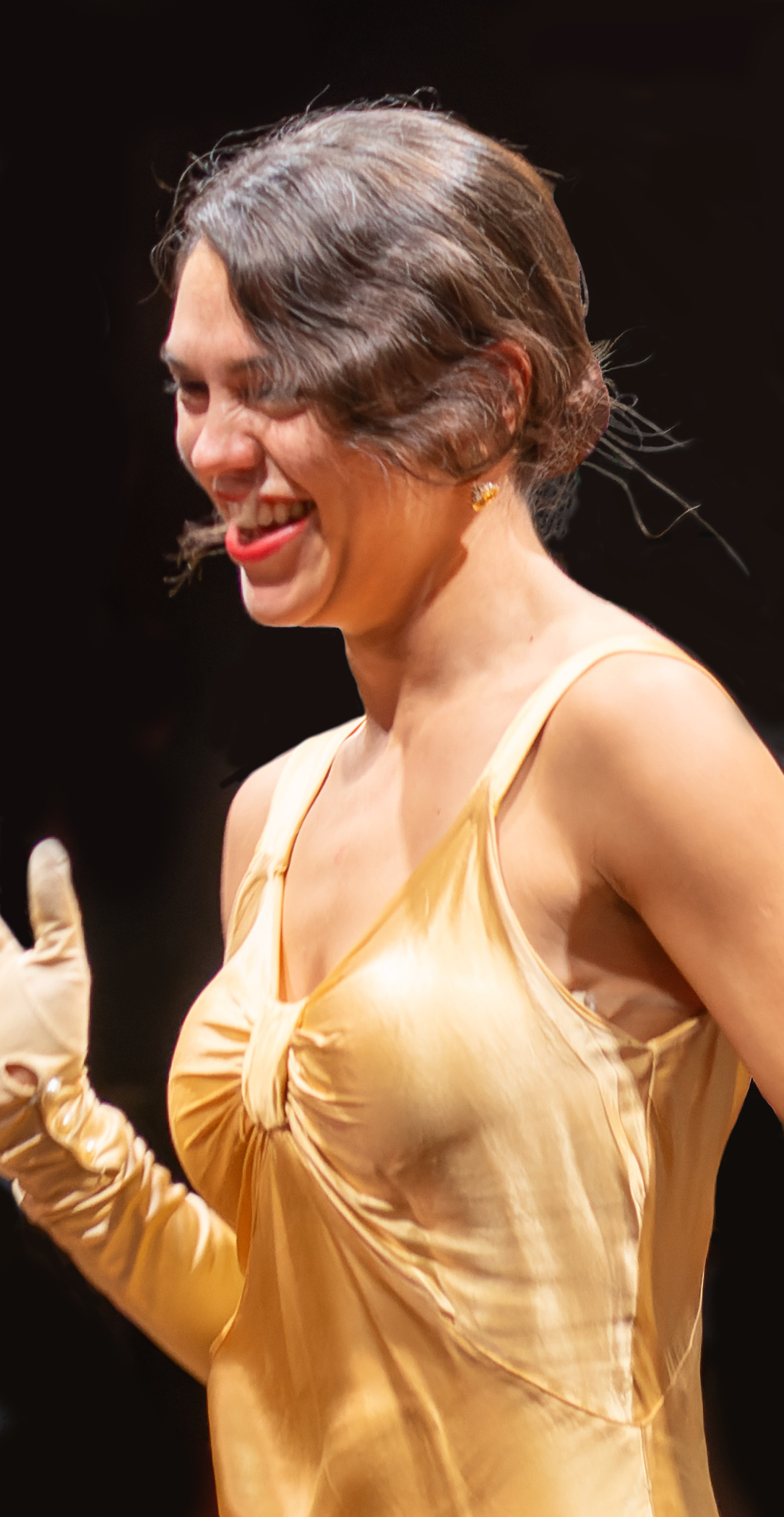
- Bartlett in She Stoops to Conquer 2023
- Born: Sabrina Lois Bartlett; September 1991 (age 35); Fulham, London, England
- Education: Guildford School of Acting
- Years active: 2014–present
- Spouse: Lachie Stewart (m. 2026)

Sabrina Lois Bartlett (born September 1991) is an English actress. She is known for her roles in the BBC One miniseries The Passing Bells (2014), the third series of the ITV drama Victoria (2019), and the first series of Knightfall (2017) on History, Bridgerton (2020) on Netflix, and The Larkins (2021), also on ITV.

== Early life and education ==
Bartlett was born in Fulham and grew up on Walham Grove. Her parents Stephen and Sharon are artists, and she has two sisters and a brother. Her grandfather was born in Calcutta. The family lived between London and Romney Marsh on the Kent coast.

Prior to acting, she took up ballet to help her coordination after a dyspraxia diagnosis and attended Tring Park School for the Performing Arts in Hertfordshire. She switched to drama and went on to train at the Guildford School of Acting, graduating in 2013.

== Career ==
Bartlett landed her first major role in The Passing Bells, a 2014 BBC One World War I television drama. She had a guest role in the Doctor Who series 8 episode "Robot of Sherwood". She played the recurring roles of Sophia and Keren Smith in Da Vinci's Demons and Poldark respectively.

In 2016, Bartlett appeared in the sixth season finale of the HBO series Game of Thrones, "The Winds of Winter" as a member of House Frey, then revealed to be Arya Stark in disguise. She starred as Princess Isabella in the first season of the History series Knightfall.

Bartlett was cast as Abigail Turner in the 2019 third season of Victoria. The following year, Bartlett appeared as Siena Rosso, an opera singer with a clandestine relationship with Jonathan Bailey's character Anthony Bridgerton in the Netflix historical fiction series Bridgerton.

In 2021, she was cast as Mariette in The Larkins, the eldest of the Larkins children, whom Catherine Zeta-Jones played in the previous adaptation. She revealed in 2022 that she would not be returning for the second series and her character was replaced by Joelle Rae. It was later revealed that Bartlett lodged a formal complaint against co-star Tok Stephen, but it was not upheld, leading to her departure.

In 2023, she played Constance Neville She Stoops to Conquer by Oliver Goldsmith at the Orange Tree Theatre, Richmond.

== Personal life ==
Bartlett married Australian businessman Lachie Stewart in Italy in September 2026.

== Acting credits ==
=== Film ===
| Year | Title | Role | Notes | Ref. |
|---|---|---|---|---|
| 2014 | The Crossing | Eileen | Short film | |
| 2015 | Respite | | Short film | |
| 2024 | One Night in Bath | Lauren | | |
| TBA | Arsenic Lane | Stella Alfonsi | | |
| 2026 | F*ck Valentine's Day | Mickey | | |

=== Television ===
| Year | Title | Role | Notes | Ref. |
|---|---|---|---|---|
| 2014 | Suspects | Hannah Stevenson | Episode: "Calling Card" | |
| 2014 | Holby City | Gabriella 'Gabi' Mendoza | Episode: "The Spirit" | |
| 2014 | Doctor Who | Quayle's Ward / Maid Marian | Episode: "Robot of Sherwood" | |
| 2014 | The Passing Bells | Katie | 5 episodes | |
| 2015 | Midsomer Murders | Tina Tyler | Episode: "A Vintage Murder" | |
| 2015 | Poldark | Keren Smith | 3 episodes | |
| 2015 | Da Vinci's Demons | Sophia | 6 episodes | |
| 2016 | Game of Thrones | Maiden Frey/Arya Stark (in disguise) | Episode: 'The Winds of Winter" | |
| 2017 | Knightfall | Princess Isabella | 10 episodes | |
| 2017 | Versailles | Mathilde | Series 2; 3 episodes | |
| 2018 | The Innocents | Lil | Episode: "Bubblegum & Bleach" | |
| 2019 | Victoria | Abigail Turner | Series 3 (regular) | |
| 2020 | Bridgerton | Siena Rosso | Series 1; 5 episodes | |
| 2021 | The Larkins | Mariette Larkin | Series 1 | |
| 2025 | I, Jack Wright | Bella Horrell | Recurring role | |

=== Theatre ===
| Year | Title | Role | Venue | Notes/Ref. |
|---|---|---|---|---|
| 2015 | The Seagull | Nina Zarechnaya | Regent's Park Open Air Theatre | |
| 2016 | Cyrano de Bergerac | Roxane | Southwark Playhouse | |
| 2019 | While the Sun Shines | Elisabeth | Orange Tree Theatre | |
| 2023 | She Stoops to Conquer | Constance Neville | Orange Tree Theatre | |

=== Music videos ===
| Year | Title | Artist | Role | Notes | Ref. |
|---|---|---|---|---|---|
| 2018 | If You Wanna Love Somebody | Tom Odell | Girl | | |

=== Audio dramas ===
| Year | Title | Role | Notes | Ref. |
|---|---|---|---|---|
| 2016 | Doctor Who: The Tenth Doctor Adventures | Cora | | |

=== Video games ===
| Year | Title | Role | Notes | Ref. |
|---|---|---|---|---|
| 2022 | The DioField Chronicle | Izelair Wigan | English version | |

== Awards and nominations ==
| Year | Award | Category | Nominated work | Result | Ref. |
|---|---|---|---|---|---|
| 2015 | NewFilmmakers Los Angeles | Best Performance, Drama | The Crossing | Won | |
| 2021 | Screen Actors Guild Awards | Outstanding Performance by an Ensemble in a Drama Series | Bridgerton | Nominated | |
