= The Mating Game (film) =

1959 film by George Marshall

- theatrical poster
- Directed by: George Marshall
- Written by: William Roberts
- Based on: The Darling Buds of May; 1958 novel by H. E. Bates
- Produced by: Philip Barry, Jr.
- Starring: Debbie Reynolds; Tony Randall; Paul Douglas; Fred Clark; Una Merkel
- Cinematography: Robert J. Bronner
- Edited by: John McSweeney, Jr.
- Music by: Jeff Alexander
- Production company: Metro-Goldwyn-Mayer
- Distributed by: Metro-Goldwyn-Mayer
- Release date: April 29, 1959 (U.S.)
- Running time: 96 minutes
- Country: United States
- Language: English
- Budget: $867,000
- Box office: $3,925,000

The Mating Game is a 1959 American comedy film directed by George Marshall and starring Debbie Reynolds, Tony Randall and, in his final film role, Paul Douglas. It was produced by Metro-Goldwyn-Mayer. Reynolds sings the title song during the opening credits. The film was written by William Roberts and very loosely based on the 1958 British novel, The Darling Buds of May by H. E. Bates, which was later adapted into a more faithful 1991–1993 British TV series, starring Catherine Zeta-Jones in the role that Reynolds plays in the film.

== Plot ==
Irritated neighbor Wendell Burnshaw brings the Larkin family to the attention of the Internal Revenue Service. Lorenzo Charlton is assigned to the case by his boss, Oliver Kelsey. Ma and Pop Larkin warmly welcome him to their family farm in Maryland, at first unaware of why he is there.

Lorenzo is aghast to learn that the Larkins have never filed a tax return. With their cooperation, he sets out to figure out what, if anything, they owe in the way of back taxes, a difficult task, as Pop usually just trades for what they need and keeps no records.

Lorenzo and the eldest Larkin daughter, Mariette, become attracted to each other, but he does not let that get in the way of his work, at least not at first. However, as time goes by, he begins to loosen up and lose some of his buttoned-down mentality—especially when Pop encourages him to drink a strong alcoholic beverage. When Kelsey and Burnshaw drop by to check his progress, Kelsey is displeased with this development. He takes charge of the investigation and sends Lorenzo back to the office in disgrace.

Kelsey calculates the Larkins owe $50,000. The Larkins are unable to pay such a large sum, so Kelsey tells them they can either sell the farm to Burnshaw or face foreclosure. The Larkins' many friends rally round them and offer to buy some of their junk for inflated prices, but Pop proudly turns them down.

Meanwhile, Mariette goes to see Lorenzo. The family's only hope is a receipt for 30 horses bought by the government in the American Civil War and never paid for. With great difficulty, they manage to see Inspector General Bigelow. His legal department calculates that the Larkins are owed, with all the interest that has accrued, over $14 million. Pop decides not to accept it, as he did nothing to earn it, but Lorenzo gets Bigelow to agree to apply it against all present and future taxes owing.

== Cast ==
- Tony Randall as Lorenzo Charlton
- Debbie Reynolds as Mariette Larkin
- Paul Douglas as Pop Larkin
- Una Merkel as Ma Larkin
- Fred Clark as Oliver Kelsey
- Philip Ober as Wendell Burnshaw
- Philip Coolidge as Reverend Osgood
- Charles Lane as Inspector General Bigelow
- Trevor Bardette as Chief Guthrie
- William Smith as Barney
- Addison Powell as David De Groot
- Rickey Murray as Lee Larkin
- Donald Losby as Grant Larkin
- Cheryl Bailey as Victoria Larkin
- Caryl Bailey as Susan Larkin

== Production ==
The film was shot in Metrocolor and CinemaScope.

== Box office ==
According to MGM records, the film earned $2.6 million in the US and Canada and $1,325,000 elsewhere, resulting in a profit of $1,261,000.

== Home media ==
The film was released on DVD by The Warner Archive in March 2009.
