= Little Chart =

Civil parish and small village in Ashford in Kent, England

Coordinates: 51.1791°N 0.7809°E

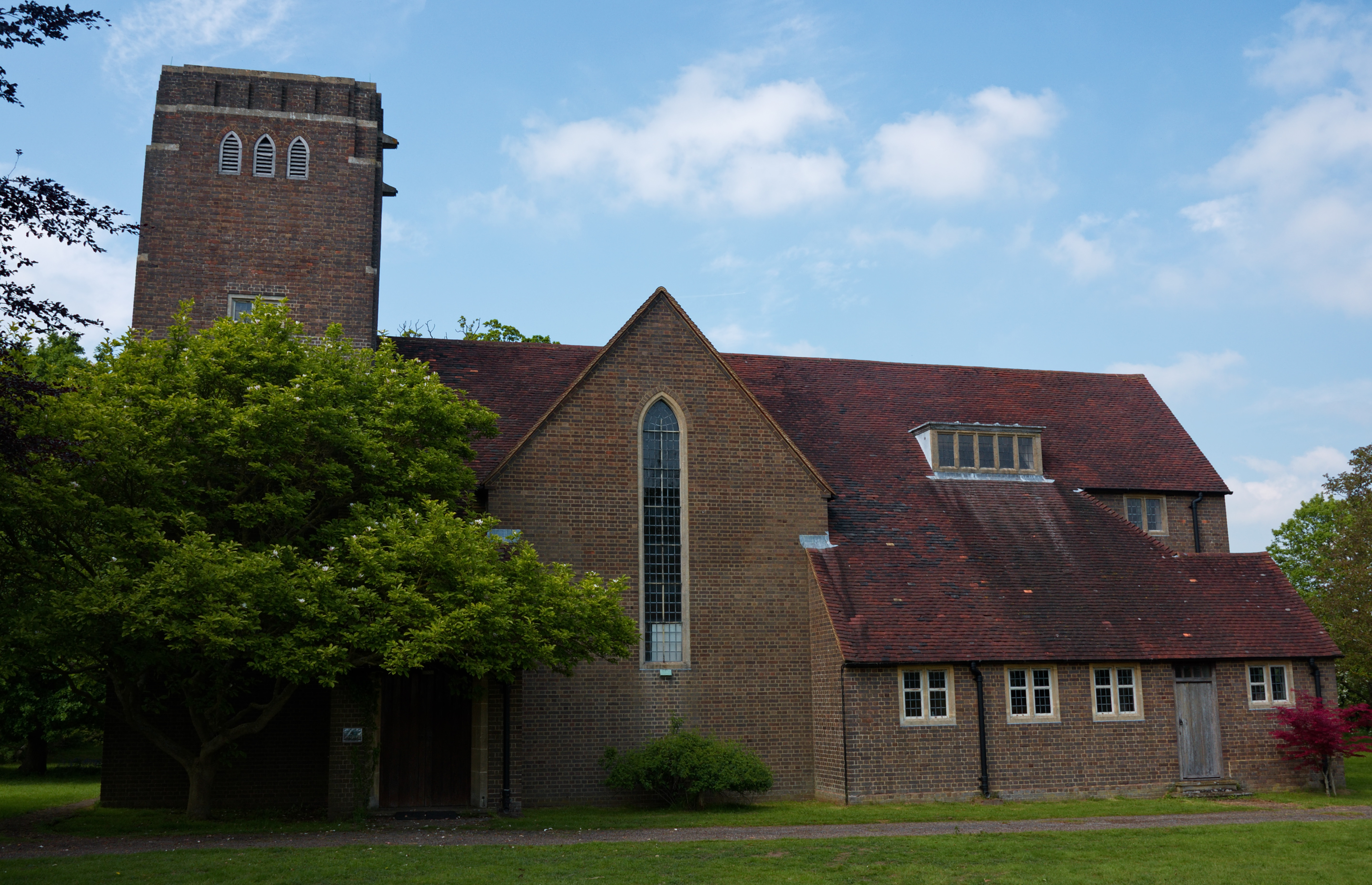
- The replacement St Mary the Virgin Church

- Location within Kent
- Area: 6.01 km^{2} (2.32 sq mi)
- Population: 234 (Civil Parish 2011)
  - Density: 39/km^{2} (100/sq mi)
- OS grid reference: TQ943459
- Civil parish: Little Chart
- District: Ashford
- Shire county: Kent
- Region: South East
- Country: England
- Sovereign state: United Kingdom
- Post town: Ashford
- Postcode district: TN27
- Dialling code: 01233
- Police: Kent
- Fire: Kent
- Ambulance: South East Coast
- UK Parliament: Weald of Kent

Little Chart is a village and civil parish, situated 4 miles (6.4 km) north-west of Ashford in Kent, South East England. The parish lies south of the M20 motorway.

== Geography ==
Within the parish boundaries is the linear settlement village centre by the old water mill and two smaller neighbourhoods less than 500m east:

- Little Chart Forstal (the term forstal means the land in front of a farm and farmyard; cp Painters Forstal). Colloquially known as The Forstal, it is home to Little Chart Cricket Club.
- Rooting Street

The river flowing eastwards, passing a long mill pond and mill on its way, is the West Stour.

== History ==
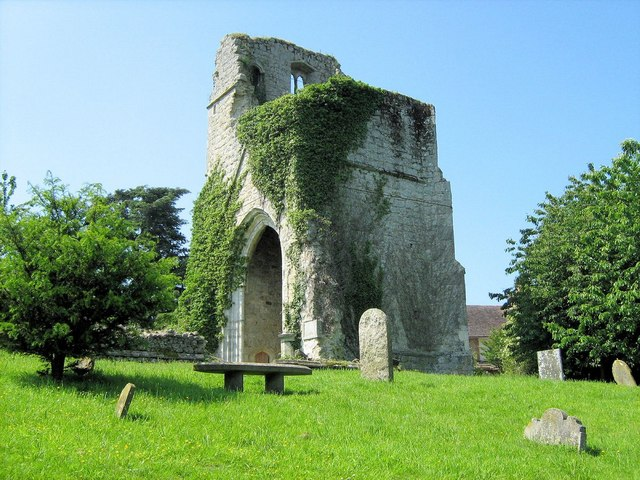
The ruined church of St Mary the Virgin; destroyed in 1944 by a V1 flying bomb.

The secular property that would have had the highest grading of listed building in the parish, Surrenden Park, half in Pluckley, was owned by the Dering family for over 400 years; the family estate covered about four square miles of Kent. Part of their property was Calehill Park, to the north. Neither property now exists: Surrenden succumbed to fire in 1952; Calehill was demolished in 1951.

== Transport ==
Little Chart is situated close to the M20 motorway. The closest railway station is Charing.

== Amenities ==
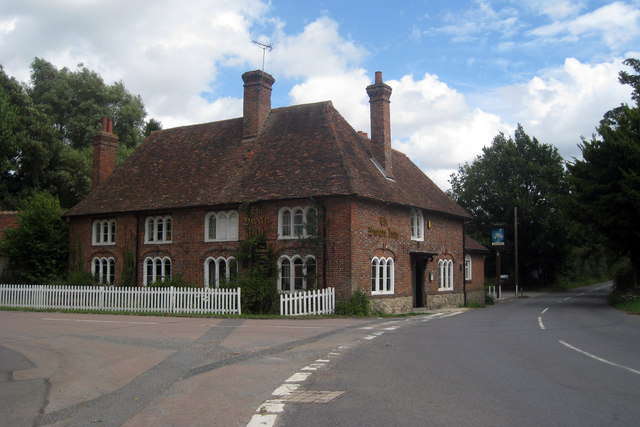
The Swan Inn

The original village church, dedicated to St Mary the Virgin and the Holy Rood, was wrecked in 1944 by a V-1 flying bomb during World War II; it stood on a site further upstream from the village, near Chart Court. The new church, completed in 1955, is now within the village.

The Ford Paper Mill, named after the one-time ford over the Great Stour, has a long history, and is still in operation dealing in salvaged paper.

The Stour Valley Walk, which follows the Great Stour river, and the Greensand Way, from north to south, are both routed through the village. The village has a large pub, The Swan Inn.

== Past residents ==
Jonathan Bates, the Oscar-nominated sound engineer and youngest son of acclaimed writer H. E. Bates, was born in the village.

Australian-born current affairs and sports journalist and broadcaster Jeffrey Thomas owned and lived in the Grade II listed Forstal Farmhouse with his family in the 1970s, where he was instrumental in the formation of the Little Chart Cricket Club in the Kent Village Cricket League.

== See also ==
- Listed buildings in Little Chart
