= The Larkins (2021 TV series) =

English ITV comedy drama

- series logo
- Genre: Comedy-drama
- Based on: The Darling Buds of May by H. E. Bates
- Written by: Simon Nye; Abigail Wilson
- Directed by: Andy De Emmony
- Starring: Bradley Walsh; Joanna Scanlan; Sabrina Bartlett; Tok Stephen
- Theme music composer: Nick Green
- Country of origin: England
- Original language: English
- No. of series: 2
- No. of episodes: 13

Production
- Executive producers: Simon Nye; Ben Farrell; Sophie Clarke-Jervoise; Charlotte Lewis; Toby Stevens; Bradley Walsh
- Producer: Serena Cullen
- Running time: 47 minutes
- Production companies: Objective Fiction; Genial Productions; OMG Scotland.

Original release
- Network: ITV
- Release: 10 October 2021 – 27 November 2022

The Larkins is an English comedy-drama television series, produced by Objective Fiction and Genial Productions. The series is the most recent adaptation of H. E. Bates novel The Darling Buds of May.

Both the novel and the series are set in rural 1950s Kent. The series stars Bradley Walsh as "Pop" Larkin and Joanna Scanlan as "Ma" Larkin. They have six children. The eldest daughter, Mariette, is played by Sabrina Bartlett (series 1) and Joelle Rae (series 2), while Tok Stephen plays accountant Cedric "Charley" Charlton.

In February 2023, the British tabloid press speculated that the series had been cancelled owing to poor ratings, although there was no official statement from ITV. In a television interview, Walsh suggested that, although there might be no new series in 2023 owing to his own unavailability, the possibility of a feature-length special was being explored.

== Characters ==
Character	Portrayed by	Series 1	Series 2	Appearances
Pop Larkin	Bradley Walsh	Main	Main	13
Ma Larkin	Joanna Scanlan	Main	Main	13
Mariette Larkin	Sabrina Bartlett	Main		7
Mariette Larkin	Joelle Rae		Main	3
Cedric 'Charley' Charlton	Tok Stephen	Main	Main	10
Primrose Larkin	Lydia Page	Main	Main	13
Montgomery Larkin	Liam Middleton	Main	Main	13
Victoria Larkin	Lola Shepelev	Main	Main	13
Zinnia Larkin	Davina Coleman	Main		7
Zinnia Larkin	Summer Miller		Main	6
Petunia Larkin	Rosie Coleman	Main		7
Petunia Larkin	Sienna-Mae Miller		Main	6
Baby Oscar	Uncredited	Guest		2
Baby Oscar	Arthur Devoy		Recurring	6
The Reverend Ian Candy	Maxim Ays		Recurring	6
Cuthbert Jerebohm	Julian Rhind-Tutt		Recurring	6
Pinkie Jerebohm	Morgana Robinson		Recurring	6
Blanche Jerebohm	Lucy Allix		Recurring	4
Gilbert Jerebohm	Hector Bateman-Harden		Recurring	4
The Vicar	Peter Davison	Recurring	Recurring	13
Miss Edith Pilchester	Amelia Bullmore	Recurring	Recurring	13
Libby Fothergill	Francesca Wilson Waterworth	Recurring	Recurring	12
The Brigadier	Kriss Dosanjh	Recurring	Recurring	12
Miss Chand	Seeta Indrani	Recurring	Recurring	12
Pauline Molloy	Natalie Mitson	Recurring	Recurring	11
Alec Norman	Tony Gardner	Recurring	Recurring	11
Norma Norman	Selina Griffiths	Recurring	Recurring	11
PC Harness	Barney Walsh	Recurring	Recurring	11
Johnny Delamere	Robert Bathurst	Recurring	Recurring	7
Tom Fisher	Stephen Hagan	Recurring		6
Angela Snow	Katherine Kingsley	Guest	Guest	4
Chauffeur Berndt	David Langham		Guest	5
Old Reg	Wil Johnson	Guest		4
Aunt Fan	Angela Bain	Guest		3
Lady (Rose) Bluff-Gore	Georgie Glen	Guest		3
Sir George Bluff-Gore	Nicholas Le Prevost	Guest		3
Mrs Fothergill	Victoria Wicks	Guest		3
Bertha	Samantha Spiro	Guest		1

== Episodes ==
=== Series overview ===
Series	Episodes	Originally released		Average viewership (in millions)
Series	Episodes	First released	Last released	Average viewership (in millions)
1	6	10 October 2021	14 November 2021	5.51
2	6	16 October 2022	27 November 2022	4.08
Christmas Special	1	25 December 2021		3.21

=== Series 1 (2021) ===
No. overall	No. in series	Title	Directed by	Written by	Original release date	UK viewers (millions)
1	1	"In which we meet the Larkin family"	Andy De Emmony	Simon Nye	10 October 2021	7.20
Pop learns that the Horse and Hounds committee is seeking a new "Master of Hounds", with Alec Norman, his wealthy rival, in the running. Meanwhile, Mariette expresses her intentions to Pop and Ma to move to France. Alec is soon bestowed the title of Master of Hounds. Pop visits his friend Edith Pilchester, learning she has been approached to sell her cottage to a city-type individual who wants to use it as a "weekend bolthole". Primrose admits to Mariette she is infatuated with a boy called Eddie who works at the travelling fair and Mariette agrees to help Primrose find him. Wishing to earn their neighbour's respect, Pop obtains a Rolls-Royce from local thespian Johnny Delamere. Edith's potential buyer returns and Pop encourages her to accept his deal. At the fair, Mariette and Primrose locate Eddie. Ma dupes the gossiping Vicar into thinking Pop is an educated man with the presence of the Rolls-Royce and a book of literature; as intended, the Vicar relays the falsehood to the villagers, who are preparing for the May Day fair. When a felled tree blocks the road to Edith's house, Pop informs the buyer that as he owns the surrounding land only he can grant access to the cottage, and the buyer subsequently pulls out of the contract. At the May Day fair, Pop demonstrates his largesse by buying many lots at the charity auction and tricks Alec into a bidding war for a seascape painting. Its creator is revealed as Montgomery Larkin only after Alec has won. A furious Alec insults the villagers and is relieved of the position of Master of Hounds; both Pop and Ma decline the position and it is given to the Brigadier. Mariette reveals that she will not leave for France until the end of the summer. When the Larkins return to the farm, a stranger awaits them in the yard. He tells them he's a tax inspector!
2	2	"In which the Larkins woo Charley the Tax Man"	Andy De Emmony	Simon Nye	17 October 2021	6.02
The episode opens right where the previous one ended. The Larkins invite Cedric inside, who tries to maintain his professional distance but having been plied with alcohol, misses the last train and ends up sleeping on the snooker table overnight. Next morning, while in Littlechurch, Pop bumps into Sir George Bluff-Gore and makes an offer on Bluff Court which is in a precarious state of disrepair. Meanwhile, Montgomery is preparing for the straw man race by fixing up an old pram with the assistance of Victoria. Cedric, realising that there are no written accounts, decides to shadow Pop for the day with a view to making an assessment of the amount of taxes owed. Mariette offers to tag along. She distracts him with a walk in the countryside while Pop slips off to Bluff Court to seal the deal on the house. This eventually reaches the ears of Alec Norman who pays Cedric a visit at his lodgings to relay this fact and open Cedric's eyes to the subterfuge that has taken place. The Brigadier and Edith decide to put in a good word for Pop with Cedric, emphasising his generosity and charitable nature. It seems to do the trick. Pop decides to turn the tables on Alec, having learned that he is the whistleblower. While paying him a visit, Pop hints at Alec's own shady tax dealings, which Cedric overhears and declares his intention to investigate. This results in Alec backing down. The straw man race begins with the Vicar cheating from the off. Montgomery, assisted by Victoria's flywheel device, manages to move into second place. With most of the competitors drunk, a last-minute collision involving the leader and the sabotaging of the Vicar results in Montgomery taking the checkered flag on his debut appearance. Sir George and Lady Bluff-Gore approach Pop and reveal they will not be accepting his offer after all. He's been gazumped by Tom Fisher, who wants to turn Bluff Court into a hotel!
3	3	"In which Pop and Ma go on holiday"	Andy De Emmony	Simon Nye	24 October 2021	5.18
Pop reveals he has bought a second TV set, but has failed to realise the requirement for an additional or larger aerial. Charley, now firmly ensconced within the Larkin household, is worried about taking more time off work without good reason. Mariette suggests a doctor's sick note. When the doctor pays a house call, he is bribed into issuing the sick note in exchange for some meat. Ma, concerned that Pop is over-worked, books a weekend break at the seaside in Margate for just the two of them leaving Charley and Mariette in loco parentis. Meanwhile, Tom Fisher asks Mariette out on a date to which she agrees. Pop and Ma arrive at their hotel and cross paths with a duchess. In the hotel lounge, Pop strikes up a conversation with 17-year-old Kenny, the prospective groom with a wedding party. It transpires it is a "shotgun" wedding, as the bride, the duchess's daughter, is pregnant. Pop buys the wedding party champagne to lift the mood. Later, he offers to drive the bride to the register office in the Rolls-Royce. At the farm, the kids are erecting the new "huge and ghastly" TV aerial when Tom arrives to collect Mariette for their date. They head off to their table at the Hare and Hound, where Pauline is on waitress duty. Tom offers Mariette a job at his forthcoming hotel, but the date is cut short when Pauline deliberately spills wine over her dress. At the beach, Ma is sporting her hand-knitted swimming costume and goes for a swim whereupon it starts to unravel. Pop is chauffeuring the bride-to-be to her wedding and strikes up a rapport, taking her on a detour via the beach, where he has to rescue Ma and her dignity. The three of them head back to the register office and retrieve Kenny, dropping the couple off at the railway station to determine their own future. When Ma and Pop arrive home, Charley admits he was outwitted at every turn by the children and Mariette reveals she has got rid of the new aerial and made a profit in the process.
4	4	"In which the Larkins rescue the railway station"	Andy De Emmony	Simon Nye	31 October 2021	5.29
Mariette invites Charley, now a seemingly permanent fixture in Littlechurch, to help with the strawberry harvest where there is a glut of soft fruit. While in the village, Pop learns that the railway station and branch line are earmarked for potential closure. The stationmaster indicates the line is unprofitable, and Pop is informed that a final decision is due that same week. Pop enlists the help of Miss Chand and the school children to inflate the passenger numbers in an attempt to influence the outcome and save the station. On board, he learns that the refreshment trolley has been long discontinued and arranges for some of the excess strawberries to be delivered at the next stop, enabling him to flex his entrepreneurial spirit and turn a profit. In the strawberry fields, Pauline makes a beeline for Charley and her advances do not go unnoticed by Mariette. Charley reaches a crossroads in regard to his career and phones the tax office to resign with immediate effect, although he is left feeling unsure of himself afterwards when he sees Tom flirting with Mariette. Later, when Mariette tries to demote Pauline to picking rhubarb, tensions boil over and a cat fight ensues between the two love rivals. Later that week, it emerges that Pop's efforts seem to have come to naught, as the stationmaster informs him that the decision has been made to close the line the very next week, and so Pop decides to pay head office a visit in person to argue the case. It turns out the head office staff members are quite sympathetic, but the branch line simply does not make any money. Upon examining the revenues, it becomes apparent that something fishy has been going on. Pop returns to Littlechurch to confront the stationmaster and outwits him into making a confession about pilfering and under-reporting the takings and has him arrested by PC Harness.
5	5	"In which Ma's sister Bertha comes to visit"	Andy De Emmony	Simon Nye	7 November 2021	4.80
Pop, having learnt that "Spreading Linda", a beloved and ancient tree, is under threat from Tom's redevelopment, asks Edith Pilchester whether any plans have been submitted. She indicates that they have not, but will call a meeting of the parish council to discuss the matter. Charley, still suffering from self-doubt and frustrated with his lack of progress with Mariette, decides to move out of the Larkin farm. He accepts an invitation to billet with the Brigadier, where he plans a grand romantic gesture involving a sitar and an abundance of red roses. Meanwhile, Ma is frantically preparing for a visit from sister Bertha and her family from Bromley. When they arrive in a new Jaguar, it becomes apparent that Bertha is quite materialistic, her husband, Howard, an interminable bore, and daughter, Jemima, introverted and averse to country life. Tom continues to woo Mariette and invites her out for a drive in the country. Unfortunately, his roadster breaks down, which it later turns out is thanks to Victoria attempting to sabotage both his motor car and chances with Mariette. At the village hall, Tom presents a robust case in defence of his proposal. Pop and Ma realise that the nine-member parish council is split down the middle. With the Vicar likely to hold the deadlock-breaking vote, they resolve to "nobble" him. Pop pays him a visit, but Alec Norman has already beaten him to it, and so Pop has to beat Alex's "donation" to secure the Vicar's crucial vote. Back at the farm, Ma eventually snaps at the continuing asides from Bertha and challenges her to a car race around the farm. Upon seeing how determined Bertha is to win, she relents, and harmony is restored when her sister admits she feels jealous of the idyllic life Ma has. Primrose heads to the town planners to look at the planning application in full, where she discovers that the hotel development is just a small part of a much larger scheme, including a new road and housing estate. Tom is secretly confident he has done enough to secure a majority by way of "nobbling" a few council members himself until Primrose bursts into the meeting and alerts everyone to his real plans. At this bombshell, the tide turns in favour of those against, thwarting Tom's ambition. Just as Charley finally plucks up the courage to tell Mariette how he really feels, she disappears with her suitcase and passport. It seems she has left for France early!
6	6	"In which the Larkins are determined to convince Mariette to stay"	Andy De Emmony	Simon Nye	14 November 2021	4.56
The entire Larkin clan and Charley dash to intercept Mariette at the station and persuade her not to slip away quietly, but with a grand send-off at the weekend in the shape of a gymkhana and cocktail party. The next day in the Hare and Hound, Pop befriends glamorous new stranger Angela Snow. As friendly and flirtatious as ever, he invites her to the weekend's festivities, which she readily accepts. The eavesdropping Normans, partaking a drink alongside the Vicar, start to speculate that Pop is a womaniser and philanderer. Soon afterwards, Norma glimpses Ma through a window bottle feeding a baby. Back at the farm Charley finds Mariette practising French grammar in the stables and finally confesses his feelings for her; however, Mariette indicates they've just met at the wrong time in life and that, if he really loves her, he will let her go. That afternoon, Norma proceeds to spread gossip throughout Littlechurch, suggesting that the baby she witnessed Ma feeding can only be the illegitimate offspring of Mariette or Pop by some mystery woman. In reality, Ma has been helping a distant cousin in the village whose daughter has abandoned newborn Oscar. Ma agrees to take Oscar for a while and look after him until the absentee mother returns. At the gymkhana, Tom makes an appearance on his horse and, after a clear round, throws down the gauntlet to Charley. Charley, taking the bait, having never ridden before, mounts a horse bareback and proceeds to make a fool of himself; however, his efforts are rewarded with a kiss from Mariette. Tom, realising he is beaten, turns his interest to Pauline, but she, too, rebuffs him. Feeling rejected, he insults Mariette, prompting Charley to defend her honour. Fisticuffs between the two suitors ensue, with Charley emerging the victor. That evening at the cocktail bash, Ma finally presents Oscar to the rest of the villagers and explains they are adopting him. Despite the family's best efforts, Mariette is unswayed, and, the following day, she departs Littlechurch for Paris, but not alone. Accompanying her is none other than Charley.

=== Christmas special (2021) ===
No. overall	No. in series	Title	Directed by	Written by	Original release date	UK viewers (millions)
7	1	"The Larkins at Christmas"	Andy De Emmony	Simon Nye	25 December 2021	<(3.93) (Note: This episode did not make it into the top 50 most viewed programmes of the week and therefore full figures are not available.)
In the run-up to Christmas, Littlechurch finds itself in the midst of a spate of burglaries, with the Fothergills, the Brigadier, Edith Pilchester and Johnny Delamere all having fallen victim. Suspicions, fuelled by gossip from the Vicar and unfounded accusations by the Normans, centre on resident ex-convict and recluse Ambrose Nunn. Mariette and Charley return from Paris and announce the move back is for good. To celebrate, Ma decides to invite Charley's parents over for a festive lunch, but Charley is not too keen. Edith Pilchester, in the meantime, is busying herself with producing the Christmas nativity/pantomime, but rehearsals are not going well, much to the delight of Norma Norman. To exacerbate matters, a power cut strikes the village and the production is under threat of cancellation until the Larkins offer the use of their barn, as it has both lighting and heating courtesy of a generator fixed by Victoria. That night, the Normans become the latest victims of the burglar, and so Pop pays the Nunns a visit to investigate, but ends up extending the spirit of Christmas and inviting them to the nativity. At the Larkin farm, Charley's parents' visit is not going well. After a faltering start, Ma and Mrs Charlton find common ground and bond over cooking; however, Mr Charlton still has his reservations about the Larkins and their role in his son's future. All the villagers gather at the farm for the nativity, but Pop, following a hunch, lies in wait in the village shop for the burglar and things come to a head when the perpetrator is revealed. Edith's nativity is deemed a success, much to the Normans' chagrin, and Mr Charlton comes round when Charley and Mariette announce their engagement the next morning.

=== Series 2 (2022) ===
No. overall	No. in series	Title	Directed by	Written by	Original release date	UK viewers (millions)
8	1	"Bad Neighbours"	Andy De Emmony	Simon Nye	16 October 2022	4.00
Primrose, now 18 and about to leave high school, is considering her future when she spies a handsome new stranger in the village. The Vicar soon finds himself acquainted with the stranger as none other than Ian Candy, a fellow priest foisted upon him by the local dean to serve the parish. Upon learning the stranger's identity, Primrose pays him a visit at the vicarage not only to extend him a warm welcome but also to make the young cleric aware of her existence. Pop, meanwhile, in the midst of preparing Bluff Court for demolition, is approached by London family the Jerebohms, who express an interest in purchasing the property with a view to renovating it as their country retreat. After some shrewd negotiation, Pop agrees to sell at a price almost double that which he had himself paid the previous year. With renovations complete, the Jerebohms invite Ma and Pop over to a dinner party. The Jerebohms' ulterior motive is soon revealed as buyer's remorse, and they seek a substantial refund, which Ma and Pop refuse to entertain. Upon hearing about the affluent newcomers and dinner party, Norma and Alec try to ingratiate themselves with the Jerebohms, but find themselves rebuffed. The Normans are not the only ones: the Larkin children's attempt to make friends with their Jerebohm peers also proves unsuccessful, as does Primrose's offer to take the Reverend Mr Candy on a date to the movies. The Jerebohms decide their next course of action is to make the Larkins' life intolerable by taking up shooting. However, the constant noise from gunfire only serves to make them deeply unpopular with the rest of the village. Pop, however, soon gains the upper hand, but the lines are drawn for a future showdown.
9	2	"The Trap"	Andy De Emmony	Simon Nye	23 October 2022	3.77
The Jerebohms and Normans join forces and hatch a plan to both humiliate and destroy the Larkins. The Larkins, in contrast, are planning to mend bridges and decide to throw a barbecue for the entire village, with the Jerebohms as guests of honour. The Vicar meanwhile is taking full advantage of the Reverend Mr Candy by sitting back and allowing the newcomer to do all the work, both parish and household. Primrose tries to impress her maturity upon the young clergyman and does not go unnoticed by him at church. She invites him to the barbecue, and, in the meantime, sets her heart on a job as a journalist, approaching The Mid-Kent Times, where she finds herself turned away until she gets more experience. Ma intervenes with the editor, and secures her a trainee position and publication of her first article. Pop and Pinkie cross paths on a country lane, where Pinkie hints she is under the thumb of her husband, Cuthbert. At the barbecue, she elaborates that he also has a violent temper. When a telephone call from an audibly distressed Pinkie arrives asking to borrow money so she can escape her husband, Pop readily agrees. With no answer at the door and raised voices from within, Pop breaks into Bluff Court, but is accused of burglary. In possession of a large amount of cash and standing beside an emptied safe, Pop is placed under arrest by PC Harness.
10	3	"Love and Violence"	Andy De Emmony	Abigail Wilson	30 October 2022	3.77
Ma, sensing cupid may need a helping hand, engineers some alone-time for Primrose and the Reverend Mr Candy by inviting the young clergyman to a Larkins' family supper and then making sure the wider family are largely absent. Pears' travelling fair, owned by Pop's old friend "Fruity", comes to Littlechurch. Upon learning that "Fruity" is considering closing down permanently owing to difficult economic times coupled with the changing tastes of the populace, Pop buys the operation and employs "Fruity" to run it, thus injecting some much needed capital into the ageing attraction. When trouble rears its head in the shape of some bothersome teddy boys (and girls), Edith Pilchester, with her crack aim, sends them packing, but they return in greater numbers. Primrose's first day at the offices of The Mid-Kent Times entails making endless cups of tea for the other reporters. Using her ingenuity, she devises a tea station, allowing her to focus on matters more journalistic. Elsewhere, in a further escalation of their enmity, the Jerbohms and Larkin children have a showdown on a country lane involving a puddle, car keys, a hungry bull and lots of strawberries.
11	4	"Wheels of Justice"	Andy De Emmony	Simon Nye	13 November 2022	4.13
With the court case looming large, the Larkin family are all deeply concerned – all apart from Pop, who has decided on representing himself in front of the magistrates. The Jerebohms, in contrast, have engaged a top London lawyer, who has an impeccable record of prosecutions. Primrose decides to report on the case for The Mid-Kent Times under the guise of a pseudonym, at the same time as trying to keep her burgeoning relationship with the Reverend Mr Candy out of the public eye. In court, Pop pleads not guilty, but Alec Norman and Pinkie Jerebohm lie under oath, and his character witnesses, Miss Pilchester and the Brigadier, fail to convince the magistrates of Pop's good standing within the community. Outgunned and painted as a dodgy dealer by the prosecution, Pop is unsurprisingly found guilty and given a custodial sentence of one year, as it is his first offence. Mariette and Charley return from their honeymoon in Europe to be greeted by the bad news, and resolve to fight the decision with the rest of the Larkin clan.
12	5	"Pop in Prison"	Andy De Emmony	Simon Nye	20 November 2022	4.35
While Pop languishes in prison, his fellow villagers are divided on the question of whether there has been a miscarriage of justice or whether Pop is indeed guilty. Primrose sets to work, undertaking some investigative journalism on the Jerebohms' backgrounds. She discovers that Cuthbert Jerebohm has been declared bankrupt in the past with a conviction for fraud, and that Pinkie was divorced by a previous husband on the grounds of cruelty. Ma pays magistrate Sprague a visit to lodge an appeal based on the new found information, but is refused. On hearing of Pop's incarceration, Angela Snow offers the services of her father, Sir John Furlington Snow, a retired QC, who suggests that what is needed is an ally from within the ranks of the accusers. Mariette appeals to Berndt the chauffeur and he confirms Pop's innocence, supplying further evidence. The magistrate, however, who has been bribed and subsequently blackmailed by Pinkie, once again refuses an appeal. Norma Norman, uncomfortable ever since her husband Alec lied under oath, approaches Ma with information that could prove pivotal.
13	6	"Vengeance"	Andy De Emmony	Simon Nye	27 November 2022	4.47
Having downed one too many sherries, Norma divulges that the magistrate had been bribed by Pinkie and that her husband, Alec, had failed to declare that he was acquainted with the magistrate as a fellow Freemason at the local lodge. Ma formulates a sting operation to gather hard evidence, enlisting the help of PC Harness and some surveillance equipment. Having secreted a microphone in a plant pot, Norma invites Pinkie round for afternoon tea and steers the conversation round to Pop's conviction and the corrupt magistrate; although Pinkie's suspicions are aroused, PC Harness manages to record some very incriminating revelations. The Dean, having received reports that the Vicar has shown no change in his ways, pays a visit and informs him that he is being posted to a different parish. The sudden prospect of having to give up his carefree life prompts the Vicar into asking the Reverend Mr Candy to do the decent thing and leave first. After some thought and a heart-to-heart with Primrose, the Reverend Mr Candy declines, resulting in the Vicar throwing him out of the vicarage and barricading himself in. Eventually, the newcomer and Primrose offer a compromise and Littlechurch retains both clerygmen. Ma and Angela Snow confront magistrate Sprague with the recording, insisting he resign immediately and give Pop a full pardon. Once again a free man, Pop returns to the village and gives the Jerebohms an ultimatum: sell Bluff Court back to him at a knockdown price and leave Littlechurch for good, or prepare to face justice.

== Filming locations ==
Various locations throughout the south east of England have been used during filming to stand in for the fictional setting of Littlechurch, including the villages of West Peckham and Underriver in Kent. Romshed Farm near Sevenoaks served as the Larkins farm and home. According to the Kent Film office, some of the other key locations for series 1 are:

- Viking Bay and Victoria Gardens in Broadstairs;
- Faversham (and the Guildhall);
- Stonepitts Farm near Sevenoaks;
- Long Barn in Sundridge;
- Squerryes Court in Westerham;
- The Walpole Bay Hotel & Museum in Margate;
- Eynsford (The Village Hall, Castle Hotel, The Five Bells Pub and Eynsford riverside); and
- Tonbridge Castle (Tonbridge).

New locations featured in the 2021 Christmas Special include Underriver Village Hall, a private residence in Underriver and a private cottage in Chiddingstone.

== Reception ==
=== Reviews ===
The first episode of The Larkins received generally positive reviews.

James Jackson of The Times wrote: "The jollity of the voracious Larkin family is undeniable, bursting with enough warmth to power an entire country village", with the publication awarding it four stars out of five. The Radio Times also awarded the episode four stars out of five, particularly praising Bradley Walsh as Pop, writing: "The Larkins isn't necessarily anything revolutionary [...] But what it is is a joyous, comforting and homely show which feels like you're getting a big old hug."

Benjie Goodhart, writing for Saga Magazine, wrote that, despite his reservations, he "loved it" and praised the cast as "excellent". The Telegraph's Vicki Power remarked that "the dialogue fizzes with playful wit" and summarised their review by saying: "Shot in lush golden hues, this is an entertaining hour of warm-bath telly, the perfick autumn antidote".

In contrast, The Telegraph's Anita Singh gave the episode two stars out of five, criticising the acting and the racial diversity of the cast they felt was not representative of the time period and setting. However, with some of these shortcomings removed, she revised her opinion for episode one of series two, awarding it four stars and writing that "the show is playing to its strengths: broad comedy and sweet romance. It also serves as a nice hour of escapism".

Sean O'Grady of The Independent described the episode as "an abomination" and "opioid atavistic tosh", panning the portrayal of the setting as "cloyingly class-ridden [...] and bewilderingly archaic to modern eyes".

=== Viewership ===
The opening episode was the third most-watched show of the week and second most-watched show of the day. It averaged just more than 5.3 million people (including those watching on British television network ITV's +1 channel) and was watched by 35.3% of the audience over the hour. Following a seven-day catch-up period, the figure aggregated to 6.58 million people.

== Broadcast ==
Internationally, the series was acquired in New Zealand by the TVNZ network and premiered on 31 October 2021. It began its first series run in Belgium and the Netherlands on 15 November 2021 via the BBC First channel. In Australia, the series was picked up by ABC and broadcast in the prime time Saturday evening slot starting on 27 November 2021. First broadcast rights in the US and Canada have been acquired by the AMC-owned Acorn TV streaming service, with the first two episodes available to stream on 13 December 2021. In Spain, the series was released on 4 January 2022 on Filmin, while the second season was released on 27 December 2022.

== Home media ==
Series	Release date			
Series	Region 1/A	Region 2 (UK)	Region 2 (Germany)	Region 4
1	3 May 2022	20 December 2021		16 February 2022
2		19 December 2022		10 May 2023
