= The Darling Buds of May (novel) =

1958 novel by H.E. Bates

- First edition
- Author: H. E. Bates
- Cover artist: James Broom-Lynne
- Language: English
- Genre: Comedy novel
- Publisher: Michael Joseph
- Publication date: 1958
- Publication place: United Kingdom
- Media type: Print (hardback & paperback)
- ISBN: 0-14-001602-3
- Followed by: A Breath of French Air

The Darling Buds of May is a novella by British writer H. E. Bates published in 1958. It was the first of a series of five books about the Larkins, a rural family from Kent. The title of the book is a quote from William Shakespeare's Sonnet 18: Shall I compare thee to a summer's day? / Thou art more lovely and more temperate: / Rough winds do shake the darling buds of May, / And summer's lease hath all too short a date; [...]

== Plot synopsis ==
Pop and Ma Larkin and their many children take joy in nature, each other's company, and almost constant feasts. Their only income is through selling scrap, picking strawberries, and selling farm animals or previous purchases that they've tired of. Nevertheless, they joyfully spend money on horses, cars, perfume, fine furniture, and holidays abroad. Pop Larkin opposes taxes and any barriers to free enterprise.

Pop and Ma Larkin celebrate sex, youth, and vitality. In each novella in the series, Pop Larkin kisses, caresses, and pinches most of the women that he encounters. Ma Larkin accepts his behaviour and usually approves of it. When told that Pop has kissed the middle-aged Miss Pilchester, she responds, "Do her good. Make her sleep all the sweeter."

In the first novella, Pop, Ma, and Mariette Larkin attempt to beguile Cedric Charlton, a timid and naive tax inspector, into abandoning his investigation of their finances. Their ultimate goal is for Mariette, who is secretly pregnant at the age of seventeen, to marry "Charley" and thus provide a father for her baby. Ultimately Mariette develops true feelings for Charley and they do become engaged. Charley is never told of the pregnancy, which turns out to be a false alarm.

== Adaptations ==
The novel was loosely adapted into the film The Mating Game in 1959. ITV produced a television series of the novel, and its sequels plus additional original storylines, The Darling Buds of May, which ran from 1991 to 1993. A further adaptation of the novel, The Larkins, was made by ITV and broadcast in October 2021.
