= Kenneth Widmerpool =

Fictional character in Anthony Powell's novel sequence A Dance to the Music of Time

- A Dance to the Music of Time character
- Kenneth Widmerpool, depicted by Mark Boxer on the cover of At Lady Molly's, Fontana 1977
- Created by: Anthony Powell

In-universe information
- Gender: Male
- Title: Lord Widmerpool
- Occupation: Solicitor, financier, politician
- Spouse: Pamela Flitton
- Nationality: British

Kenneth Widmerpool is a fictional character in Anthony Powell's novel sequence A Dance to the Music of Time, a 12-volume account of upper-class and bohemian life in Britain between 1920 and 1970. Regarded by critics as one of the more memorable characters of 20th century fiction, Widmerpool is the antithesis of the sequence's narrator-hero Nicholas Jenkins. Initially presented as a comic, even pathetic figure, he becomes increasingly formidable, powerful and ultimately sinister as the novels progress. He is successful in business, in the army and in politics, and is awarded a life peerage. His only sphere of failure is his relationships with women, exemplified by his disastrous marriage to Pamela Flitton. The sequence ends with Widmerpool's downfall and death, in circumstances arising from his involvement with a New Age-type cult.

Literary analysts have noted Widmerpool's defining characteristics as a lack of culture, small-mindedness, and a capacity for intrigue; generally, he is thought to embody many of the worst aspects of the British character. However, he has the ability to rise above numerous insults and humiliations that beset him to achieve positions of prominence through dogged industry and self-belief. In this respect he represents the meritocratic middle class's challenge to the declining power of the traditional "establishment" or ruling group, which is shown to be vulnerable to a determined assault from this source.

Among the more prominent names suggested as real-life models for Widmerpool have been Edward Heath, the British prime minister 1970–1974 and Reginald Manningham-Buller who was Britain's Attorney General in the 1950s. Others of Powell's contemporaries have made claims to be the character's source, although Powell gave little encouragement to such speculation. Widmerpool has been portrayed in two British Broadcasting Corporation (BBC) radio dramatisations of the novel sequence (1979–1982 and 2008) and in Channel 4's television filmed version broadcast in 1997.

== Context: A Dance to the Music of Time ==
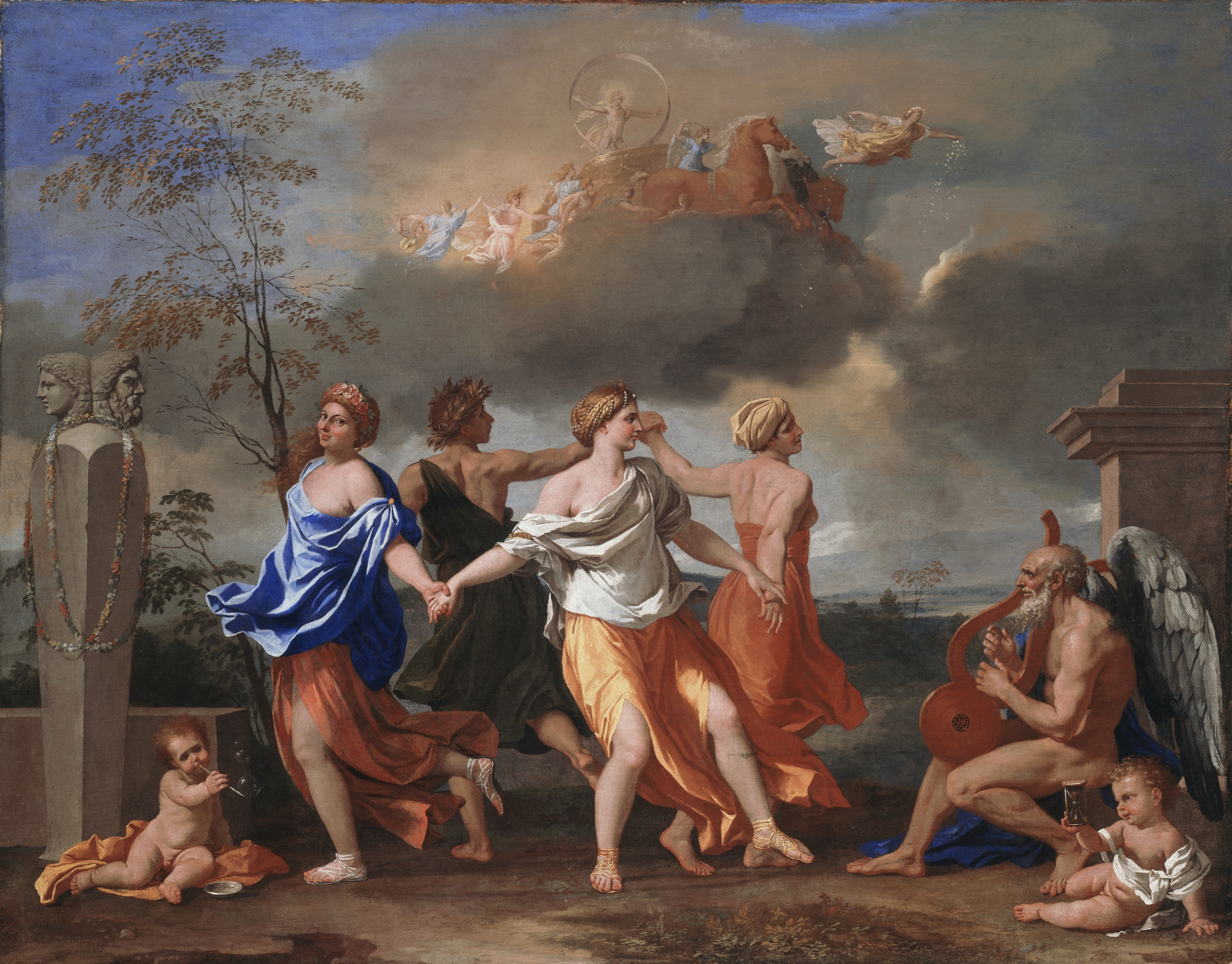
Poussin's A Dance to the Music of Time, from which the name of Powell's sequence of novels is derived. The four seasons dance in a circle as "Time" plays the lute, to the right.

The novel sequence A Dance to the Music of Time comprises 12 volumes spanning a period of approximately 50 years; from the early 1920s to the first years of the 1970s. The series itself was published between 1951 and 1975. Its title is taken from Nicolas Poussin's 1634–1636 painting of the same name. Through the eyes of a narrator, Nicholas Jenkins, the reader observes the changing fortunes of a varied collection of mainly upper-class characters. Their ambience is a bohemian world of art, literature and music, intermingled with the more practical spheres of politics, business and the military. In a 1971 study of the novels the journalist and editor Dan McLeod summarised the theme of the sequence as that of a decaying establishment, confronted by "aggressive representatives from the middle classes elbowing their way up". The latter are prepared to suffer any number of indignities in their pursuit of power but the establishment proves capable of resisting the advance of "all but the most thick-hided and persevering" of outsiders. Kenneth Widmerpool becomes the principal embodiment of these incomers.

The first three volumes are set in the 1920s and follow the main characters through school, university and their first steps towards social and professional acceptance. The next three are placed in the 1930s; the protagonists become established, put down roots, watch the international situation anxiously and prepare for war. The background for the seventh, eighth and ninth volumes is the Second World War, which not all the characters survive. The final three books cover the 25 years from the early days of the post-war Attlee government to the counterculture and protests of the early 1970s. During the long narrative, the focus changes frequently from one group to another; new faces appear while established characters are written out, sometimes reappearing after many volumes, sometimes not at all, though news of their doings may reach Jenkins, through one or other of his many acquaintances. Apart from Jenkins, Widmerpool is the only one of the 300-odd characters who takes part in the action of each of the 12 volumes. Richard Jones, writing in the Virginia Quarterly Review, suggests that the novels may be regarded as "the dance of Kenneth Widmerpool, who is Jenkins's fall-guy, tormentor, and antithesis". Widmerpool dogs Jenkins's career and life; in the opening pages of the first book at school, he is encountered running through the mists, in the vain hope of athletic glory. In the final stages of the last book he is running again, this time at the behest of the quasi-religious cult that has claimed him.

== Character ==
=== Origins, appearance, personality ===
The name "Widmerpool" was assumed by many critics to derive from Widmerpool, a Nottinghamshire village. In a 1978 interview, Powell said he first came across the name in a 17th-century book, Memoirs of the Life of Colonel Hutchinson, which features a Captain of Horse, Major Joseph Widmerpoole, who served in Cromwell's army under John Hutchinson during the English Civil War. Powell viewed this Widmerpoole as a mean-spirited and disagreeable character and "had his name down for really quite a long time as a name I was going to use".

I had been associated with Widmerpool long enough to know that he could not bear to be connected with anyone, or anything, that might be made, however remotely, the subject of ridicule that could recoil even in a small degree upon himself ... The mere phrase "artificial manure" told the whole story.

— Jenkins observes Widmerpool's aversion to his father's trade.

The fictional Widmerpool's background is meritocratic rather than aristocratic. His paternal grandfather was a Scottish businessman surnamed Geddes, who on marriage to a woman of higher social standing, adopted her name as his own. The family appears to have settled in either Nottinghamshire or Derbyshire; Widmerpool's father trades as a fertiliser manufacturer, a matter of extreme embarrassment to his son, who never mentions him. His mother is a woman of strong opinions and a great admirer of Stalin; her passion is her son's career and advancement. Mother and son live together, from Widmerpool père's death in the mid-1920s until Widmerpool's marriage in 1945.

Jenkins's descriptions of Widmerpool's appearance are unflattering; at school he is painted as "heavily built, [with] thick lips and metal-rimmed spectacles giving his face as usual an aggrieved expression ... [as if] he suspected people of trying to worm out of him important information ..." A few years later, he is wearing more fashionable spectacles but Jenkins notes that he still has a curiously fishlike ("piscine") countenance. He has a propensity to put on weight; although barely 30, Widmerpool appears to Jenkins as portly and middle-aged. At the outbreak of war in 1939, in a badly cut army uniform, he resembles a music-hall burlesque of a military officer or else "a railway official of some obscure country". After the war as an MP, his demeanour and shape are "demanding of treatment by political cartoonists". In 1958, meeting Widmerpool (then in his mid-fifties) after some years, Jenkins is shocked by his elderly appearance. His clothes are ill-fitting through weight loss, giving him the look of a scarecrow; his grey hair is sparse and his facial flesh hangs in pouches. The final glimpse of Widmerpool, in his cult milieu, reveals him as a physical wreck, looking aged, desperate and worn out.

Widmerpool's chief characteristic in his youth is an exaggerated respect for and deference to authority. This is first indicated by his obsequious response to being hit in the face by a banana, thrown by the school's cricket captain. It is further shown by his outrage over a prank played by his schoolfellow Charles Stringham on their housemaster, Le Bas. He has a craving for acceptance, even at the price of humiliation, and has a natural talent for aligning himself with the dominant power. Many of Widmerpool's traits are evident quite early in his career: his pomposity, his aversion to all forms of culture ("the embodiment of thick-skinned, self-important philistinism" according to one commentator), his bureaucratic obsessions and his snobbishness. He is politically naïve and his contribution to the pre-war appeasement of Nazi Germany is to suggest that Hermann Göring be awarded the Order of the Garter and given a tour of Buckingham Palace. Yet, as the novel sequence progresses, Widmerpool emerges as far less of a buffoon and becomes, against all expectations, powerful and power-obsessed. In his analysis of Powell's fiction, Nicholas Birns identifies an incident in The Acceptance World (the third volume of the series) as the point at which the assessment of Widmerpool by his contemporaries begins to change. Widmerpool takes charge of a drunken Stringham after a reunion dinner, guides him home and despite resistance puts him firmly to bed: "Widmerpool, once so derided by all of us, had in some mysterious manner become a person of authority. Now, in a sense, it was he that derided us".

Widmerpool's egotism and will-power enable him, once set, to carry all before him, although before his ultimate downfall his powers develop in somewhat sinister directions. In a review of the early novels in the sequence, Arthur Mizener wrote: "Powell makes his great egoists, for all their absurdity, something not essentially different from all the rest of us; even Widmerpool, the most extravagant of the lot, is not. However sublimely ridiculous he becomes, he continues to remind us, not so much, perhaps, of what we have done, as what we have, in our time, known we might do".

=== Career ===
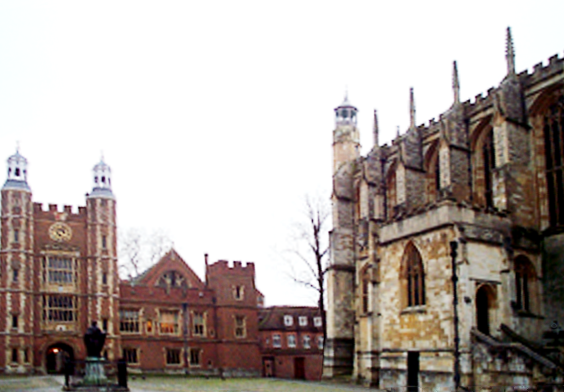
Quadrangle at Eton College, Widmerpool's presumed school

At school (not identified but generally recognised as Eton from the description of wartime bomb damage tallies), Widmerpool is undistinguished academically and athletically, a "gauche striver" in the words of one literary commentator. He is the object of some ridicule, chiefly remembered for wearing the "wrong kind of overcoat" on his arrival at the school. Driven by ambition, instead of going on to university ("much better get down to work right away") he is articled to a firm of solicitors, declaring this to be a springboard to wider horizons in business and politics. When Jenkins encounters him a few years after school, Widmerpool has achieved some social success and is a regular invitee at dinner-dances. He has also acquired a commission as a lieutenant in the Territorial Army.

Through his social contacts Widmerpool secures a job in the politico-legal department of the Donners-Brebner industrial conglomerate, a post that brings him into close contact with Sir Magnus Donners, for whom he exhibits a respect bordering on reverence. He develops a talent for intrigue, which irritates Sir Magnus to the extent that Widmerpool is asked to leave the organisation. He joins a City firm of bill-brokers and still under the age of 30, becomes an influential and respected figure in the financial world. By the late 1930s, Widmerpool is advising Donners-Brebner again. Just before the outbreak of war in September 1939, he oversees a scheme on behalf of Donners to corner the Turkish market in chromite and emerges unscathed when the project collapses.

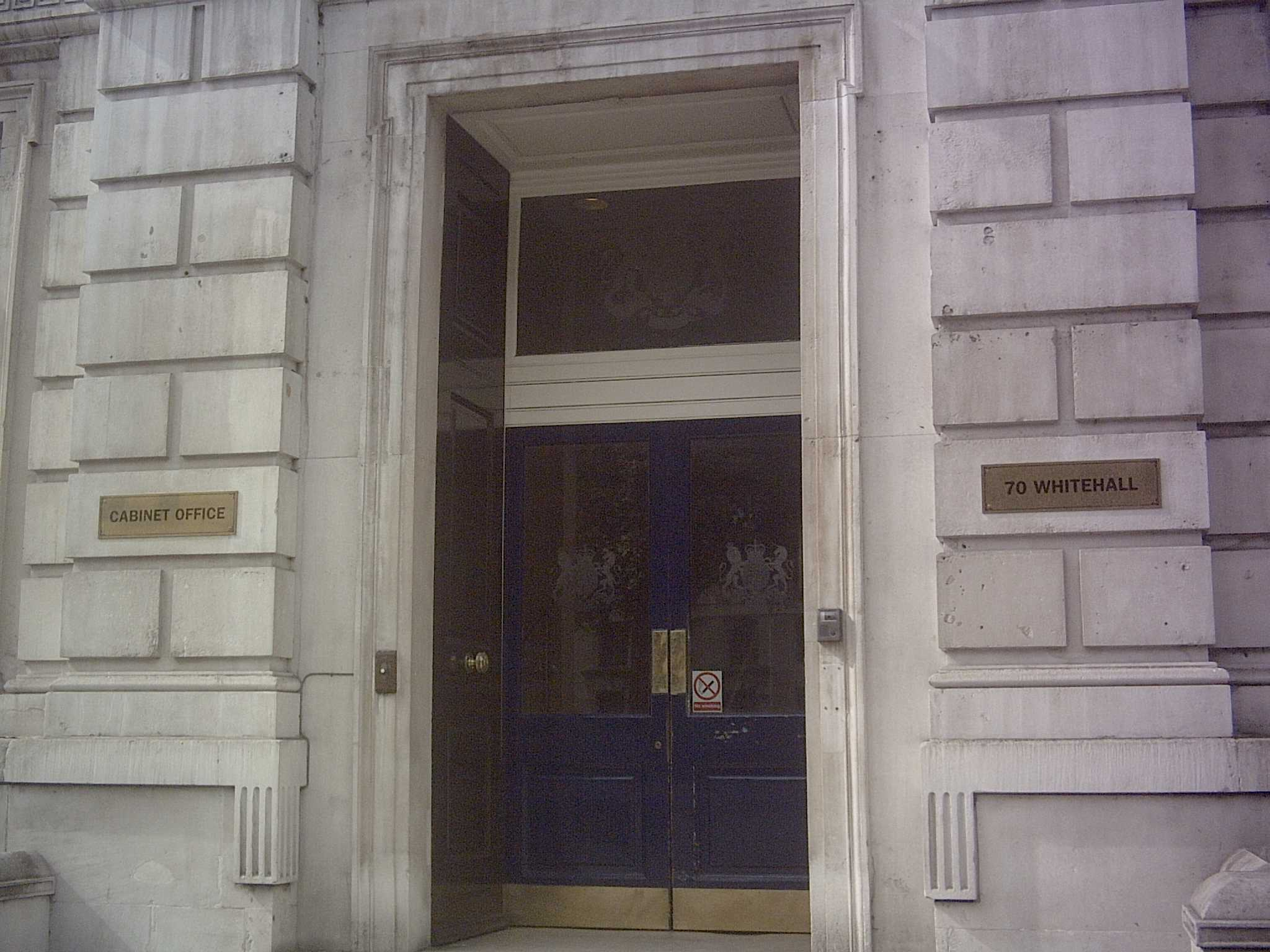
The entrance to the Cabinet Office in Whitehall, London

At the beginning of the war Widmerpool joins the army and with the advantage of his Territorial commission is rapidly promoted. By mid-1940 he holds the rank of major and is serving as Deputy-Assistant-Adjutant-General at Divisional Headquarters in Northern Ireland. Jenkins becomes his junior officer and observes Widmerpool's industry and his skill as a manipulator. Among the rank and file troops at headquarters, serving as a mess waiter, is Charles Stringham. Widmerpool is embarrassed by the presence of his former school-fellow, and engineers his transfer to a mobile laundry unit, which is sent to Singapore where Stringham meets his death. In June 1941, Widmerpool is transferred to London as a Military Assistant Secretary at the Cabinet Office. Promotions to lieutenant colonel and colonel follow and he is appointed an OBE. In his new post he is close to the centres of power and is able to influence war policy and settle old scores. He is complicit in the death of another school rival, Peter Templer, who as the result of a policy recommendation by Widmerpool, is abandoned while on a secret mission in the Balkans. Just after the end of the war, Widmerpool surprises his acquaintances by marrying Stringham's niece, Pamela Flitton, an ATS driver, whose sex life is rumoured to be "gladiatorial".

Since the mid-1930s, Widmerpool's political leanings have been generally to the left, (possibly as a result of his brief association with the radical Gypsy Jones in the late 1920s). In 1945 he becomes a Labour Member of Parliament during the postwar Attlee government and eventually receives (unspecified) minor ministerial office in the administration. He is also one of the backers of a left-leaning magazine, Fission, through which he hopes to propagate his economic and political views. He is an assiduous promoter of good relations with eastern European countries and is suspected by some of a secret communist allegiance. After losing his parliamentary seat in the 1955 General Election Widmerpool continues to promote east–west friendship and trade and is thought to have become wealthy as a result. Doubts as to his motives remain and rumours connect him with Burgess and Maclean. In 1958, Widmerpool is appointed a life peer and takes his seat in the House of Lords. His eastern European activities again arouse suspicion, questions are asked in parliament and it seems likely that he will be charged with spying but the investigation is dropped without explanation. His marriage to Pamela is disintegrating; for years he has tolerated her constant infidelities and she publicly accuses him of voyeurism. After Pamela's sudden death in 1959, Widmerpool leaves the country to take up an academic post in California.

In America Widmerpool becomes something of a figurehead among youth protest movements; there are suggestions that his earlier problems may have resulted from a CIA plot. He returns to England in the late 1960s and is installed as Chancellor of a new university. During the ceremony he is pelted with red paint but immediately identifies with the demonstrators and becomes a central figure in the counter-culture movement. He resigns the chancellorship after a year, to run a commune for dissident youth. By late 1969, he has been drawn into a more sinister cult, led by the young mystic Scorpio Murtlock, which gradually overwhelms his life and independence. He is last heard of late in 1971, when during a ritual dawn run through the woods he collapses and dies.

=== Love life ===
The novels leave open the nature and extent of Widmerpool's sexuality, an aspect on which critics have often speculated. Stephen McGregor of the Spectator describes him as "impotent"; another commentator used the words "sexual incompetent". At school he gets Akworth, a fellow-pupil, expelled for sending a presumably compromising note to Peter Templer; afterwards, Jenkins and Stringham discuss Templer's belief that Widmerpool was motivated by sexual jealousy. A few years later, Jenkins recalls how Widmerpool recoiled when touched gently on the arm by Berthe, a French girl encountered during the pair's summer sojourn at La Grenadière, shortly after leaving school.

Widmerpool was still staring wildly at Gypsy Jones, apparently regarding her much as a doctor, suspecting a malignant growth, might examine a diseased organism under a microscope; although I found later that any such diagnosis of his attitude was far from the true one.

— Jenkins describes Widmerpool's first reaction to Gypsy Jones.

In his mid-twenties, Widmerpool confesses to Jenkins his love for Barbara Goring, a girl whom he had known since his childhood. Their families had been neighbours and Widmerpool's father had supplied Lord Goring with liquid manure. This unrequited passion ends suddenly, when Barbara pours sugar over Widmerpool's head at a ball, as a means of "sweetening" him. Shortly afterwards, Widmerpool becomes obsessed by Gypsy Jones, a fiery street radical he meets by chance, who according to Jenkins resembles "a thoroughly ill-conditioned errand boy". The nature of the Widmerpool–Jones relationship is not made explicit; it culminates in his paying for an abortion, even though he is not responsible for her condition and apparently receives no favours from her in return. His actions in this respect haunt Widmerpool for a long time thereafter; he vows that he will never again allow a woman to take his mind off his work.

When he is about 30, Widmerpool becomes engaged to a considerably older widow, Mildred Haycock. His main motivation appears to be his craving for social status; she is the daughter of Lord Vowchurch. In his analysis of Powell's works, Nicholas Birns wrote: "What Widmerpool wants to do is to 'marry up', to make a marriage that will cement his upward social mobility, and he is willing to take an older woman with two teenage children in order to accomplish this." The engagement ends abruptly, over Widmerpool's impotence during an attempted premarital sexual union.

After this episode, the issue of Widmerpool's sex life is not mentioned until, in the later stages of the Second World War, he admits to picking up "tarts" during the blackout. After the war his disastrous marriage to Pamela Flitton appears to provide him with no normal physical satisfaction; according to Pamela he gave up trying after two abortive attempts to sleep with her and was reduced to furtive pleasure from observing her sexual activities with others. He is also reported to have had some depraved dealings with a prostitute known as "Pauline". In old age, within the Murtlock cult, he is said to have "watched [girls] naked, whenever he could".

== Critical and popular reception ==
Critics generally find Widmerpool the most interesting and absorbing of the sequence's major characters. He has been described as "one of the most memorable characters of 20th century fiction", and according to the literary critic John Bayley is as "famous a character in the annals of English fiction as either Pickwick or Jeeves". Powell, in a 1978 interview, confessed that he had used Widmerpool as a bait to catch readers, but found that the character had taken over, to a greater extent than he would have wished.

Nick [Jenkins] represents what Powell himself stood for, Widmerpool what he had over the years come to consider inevitable

— Christine Berberich: The Image of the English Gentleman in Twentieth-Century Literature.

The essayist Tariq Ali views Widmerpool as a giant among fictional characterisations of his kind, comparable to Baron de Charlus in Proust's epic In Search of Lost Time and Ulrich in Robert Musil's trilogy The Man Without Qualities. Ali asserts that Widmerpool is "in many ways a more inspired creation than Charlus". The circumstances of Widmerpool's death, whereby he is transformed from a believable person into "a sub-Dickensian grotesque" is, says Ali, a cause for much regret. Powell's A Writer's Notebook (2001) reveals that Powell originally considered a different ending for Widmerpool, in which he simply disappears into the mists, his ultimate fate an enigma. Ali argues that this would have been "much more in keeping with the dance of life and death".

Norman Shrapnel, in his obituary of Powell, speculates whether the author ever regretted creating the "maddening, mysterious, apparently indestructible Widmerpool" and, like Ali, expresses disappointment with the manner of the character's death. Conversely, in a biographical sketch of Powell, Michael Barber believes that Widmerpool's demise accords with a principal theme of the novels, expressed in Casanova's Chinese Restaurant (fifth book in the sequence), that "in the end most things in life—perhaps all things—turn out to be appropriate". Michael Gorra, reviewing Powell's autobiography To Keep the Ball Rolling, presents the view that, while the novels are built around Widmerpool, they are not essentially about him: "He is an organising principle, a means, not an end, and serves primarily to establish a system of judgement."

Evelyn Waugh, who reviewed the early novels as they appeared at two-year intervals, found Widmerpool particularly compelling. He wrote to Powell after reading At Lady Molly's (fourth volume): "In the opening pages I felt the void of Widmerpool really aching – I could not have borne another page's delay for his entry. Did you intend him to dominate the series?" After reviewing Casanova's Chinese Restaurant Waugh complained of a "sad disappointment – only three pages of Widmerpool".

Bernard Bergonzi, in The New York Review of Books in 1964, said "the presiding genius of The Music of Time is undoubtedly Kenneth Widmerpool"; he continued "For Powell, Widmerpool embodies in an unusually pure form the power of the will: he is obtuse, pompous, socially inept, and at the same time possessed of an almost demonic energy and an unstoppable urge to succeed."

== Real-life models ==
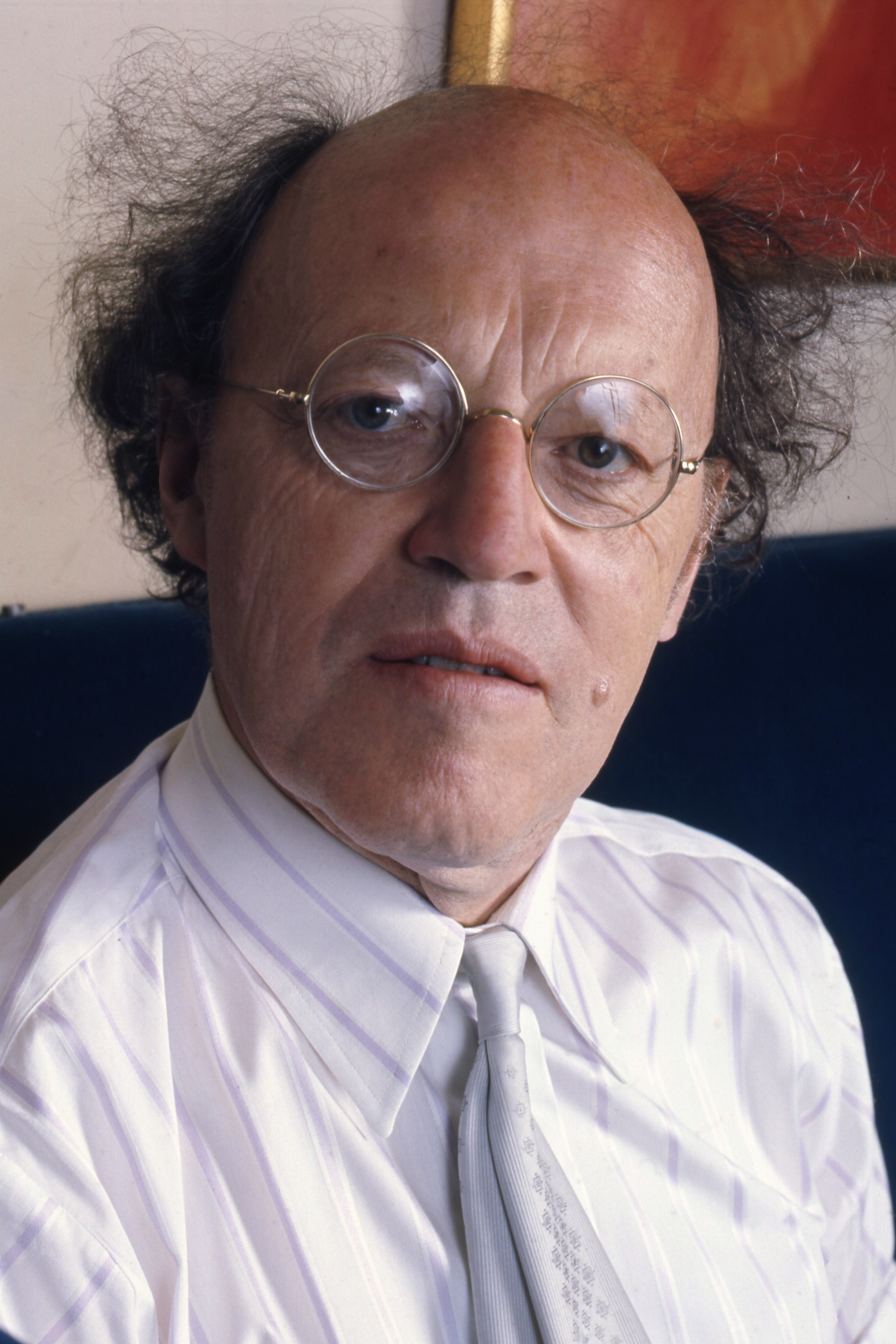
Lord Longford claimed that Widmerpool was based on him.

Many readers and literary analysts have assumed that Widmerpool was drawn from Powell's acquaintances. Powell was circumspect and chose not to confirm any of the suggestions put to him. Candidates include Powell's Eton contemporary Sir Reginald Manningham-Buller (nicknamed "Bullying-Manner"), later ennobled as Lord Dilhorne, who served as Attorney General during the 1950s and Lord Chancellor in the early 1960s. According to Powell, Manningham-Buller was an unattractive figure at school; he was instrumental in the dismissal of a master who sent an inappropriate note to a junior boy, an action reflected in the novels when Widmerpool instigates the sacking of Akworth. Powell's brother-in-law, the Labour peer Lord Longford, believed that he was the model for Widmerpool, a proposition that Powell rejected; Longford had also claimed to be Erridge, another character from the novels. The Labour politician Denis Healey thought that Powell had based Widmerpool on Edward Heath, the British prime minister between 1970 and 1974. It is possible that the episodes relating to Widmerpool's spying career are drawn from the activities of Denis Nowell Pritt, a Labour MP who was expelled from the party for his pro-Soviet stance. Powell's biographer Michael Barber wrote that Cyril Connolly declared his long-standing enemy, the art historian Douglas Cooper, to be a Widmerpool prototype; Cooper's companion John Richardson thought that Connolly was joking.

Powell came close to endorsing a real-life model in Denis Capel-Dunn, a lawyer and wartime lieutenant-colonel in the Intelligence Corps, who was briefly Powell's senior officer. Capel-Dunn was nicknamed "The Papal Bun", and was derided by his subordinates for his appearance and demeanour. He was described by his contemporaries as "a very fat, extremely boring, overwhelmingly ambitious arriviste. His conversations were hideously detailed and humourless". He was responsible, apparently through spite, for preventing Powell's promotion to the rank of major. When the historian Desmond Seward proposed Capel-Dunn as the original Widmerpool, Powell replied that he "might be on to something". Denis Capel-Dunn married overseas (Cuba) Elizabeth Hessey (daughter of Brigadier William Francis Hessey) and their first daughter Hester Capel-Dunn married the brother of actor Laurence Olivier - Gerard Dacres Olivier; the caricature may well be a red herring.

In the Catholic Herald, Alexander Lucie-Smith wrote that everyone has Widmerpools in their lives; these are usually "impenetrable egomaniacs ... who have nevertheless carried all before them". He includes in this category several recent and current politicians: "Some have thought Gordon Brown resembled him. One might point out that our current Prime Minister [David Cameron] has certain shades of Widmerpool, and like him, went to Eton".

The Anthony Powell Society, a literary society founded in 2000 to promote public interest in Powell's life and works, has from time to time offered a "Widmerpool Award" to persons in public life whose behaviour is deemed suitably "Widmerpudlian", specifically abuse of power. The recipient is presented with an engraved award representing a "wrong kind of overcoat" and the former Labour Lord Chancellor, Lord Irvine, the journalist Max Hastings and the political analyst Karl Rove have received awards. The name of John Bercow, Speaker of the House of Commons from 2009 to 2019, has been mentioned as a deserving candidate.

== Dramatic portrayals ==
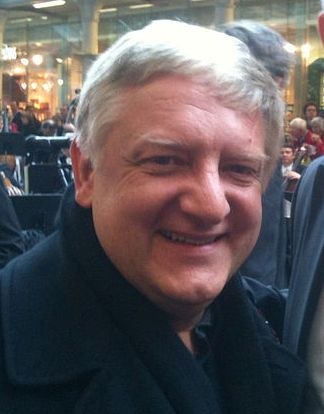
The actor Simon Russell Beale was praised for his depiction of Widmerpool

Widmerpool has twice been portrayed in BBC radio broadcasts of the Dance to the Music of Time sequence. The first was a 26-part serial, transmitted on Radio Four between summer 1979 and autumn 1982, in four batches. The novels were dramatised by Frederick Bradnum and the series was produced by Graham Gauld. The part of Widmerpool was played—with, according to one listener "audible pomposity"—by Brian Hewlett, more generally known as a longstanding cast member of the BBC radio serial The Archers. A later radio adaptation was broadcast in six episodes, in Radio Four's "Classic Serial" of April and May 2008. The dramatisation was by Michael Butt; the youthful Widmerpool was played by Anthony Hoskyns and the adult character by Mark Heap.

In October and November 1997, Channel 4 presented the novel sequence in four television films, with a screenplay by Hugh Whitemore, produced by Peter Amsorge. Widmerpool was played by Simon Russell Beale; in a generally critical review of the first film of the series, Thomas Sutcliffe in The Independent refers to Beale's performance as particularly good, bearing in mind the "thin ledges of characterisation" the script provides to the cast. The journalist David Aaronovitch thought Beale's interpretation of the character definitive: "...the Widmerpool who insinuated his podgy bulk into my private space was ... Simon Russell Beale's Widmerpool, who has come to stay". Reviewing the reissue of the films in DVD in 2012, Stuart Jeffries in The Guardian describes Widmerpool as "one of fiction's most intriguing monsters" and likens Beale's portrayal to that of "a kind of grown-up Billy Bunter with the charm sucked out". Christopher Hitchens, writing in the New York Review of Books, criticised the production (though not Beale's performance), for depicting Widmerpool as "a hapless rather than a hateful figure".

Beale was the reader for the cassette recordings of the first two novels: A Question of Upbringing and A Buyer's Market. As a result of his television portrayal of Widmerpool, he was asked by the Wallace Collection to open its Powell centenary exhibition in October 2005. In the following year he accepted a request from the Anthony Powell Society to serve as its president, a post he held until 2011.

== Sources ==
A Dance to the Music of Time novel sequence.

Publication details are given for the Fontana paperback editions first published between 1967 and 1977, to which the page references in the article refer. The second [bracketed] year is the year of the original publication.

- A Question of Upbringing. London: Fontana Books. 1967 [1951].
- A Buyer's Market. London: Fontana Books. 1967 [1953].
- The Acceptance World. London: Fontana Books. 1967 [1955].
- At Lady Molly's. London: Fontana Books. 1969 [1957]. ISBN 978-0-00-612194-7.
- Casanova's Chinese Restaurant. London: Fontana Books. 1970 [1960]. ISBN 978-0-00-612249-4.
- The Kindly Ones. London: Fontana Books. 1971 [1962]. ISBN 978-0-00-612772-7.
- The Valley of Bones. London: Fontana Books. 1973 [1964]. ISBN 978-0-00-613301-8.
- The Soldier's Art. London: Fontana Books. 1968 [1966]. ISBN 978-0-00-611791-9.
- The Military Philosophers. London: Fontana Books. 1971 [1968]. ISBN 978-0-00-612524-2.
- Books do Furnish a Room. London: Fontana Books. 1972 [1971]. ISBN 978-0-00-613087-1.
- Temporary Kings. London: Fontana Books. 1974 [1973]. ISBN 978-0-00-613436-7.
- Hearing Secret Harmonies. London: Fontana Books. 1977 [1975]. ISBN 978-0-00-614271-3.

Other books

- Amory, Mark, ed. (1995) [1980]. The Letters of Evelyn Waugh. London: Phoenix. ISBN 978-1-85799-245-8.
- Barber, Michael (2004). Anthony Powell: A life. London: Duckworth. ISBN 978-1-58567-710-8.
- Barnes, Simon (2025). Twelve Books to Furnish a Room. London: Anthony Powell Society. ISBN 978-0-9956267-9-9.
- Berberich, Christine (2007). The Image of the English Gentleman in Twentieth-Century Literature. Aldershot, UK and Burlington, Vermont: Ashgate Publishing. ISBN 978-0-7546-6126-9.
- Birns, Nicholas (2004). Understanding Anthony Powell. Columbia, South Carolina: University of South Carolina. ISBN 978-1-57003-549-4.
- Drabble, Margaret (1985). The Oxford Companion to Literature. Oxford: Oxford University Press. ISBN 978-0-19-866130-6.
- Levin, Bernard (1980) [1979]. Taking Sides (second ed.). London: Pan. ISBN 978-0-330-26203-3.
- McGovern, Una, ed. (1994). The Chambers Dictionary of Literary Characters. Edinburgh: Chambers. ISBN 978-0-550-10127-3.
- Spurling, Hilary (1992). Invitation to the Dance: A Guide to Anthony Powell's Dance to the Music of Time. London: Mandarin. ISBN 978-0-7493-1232-9. First published by William Heinemann, London 1977
