= Hearing Secret Harmonies =

1975 novel by Anthony Powell

- First edition cover
- Author: Anthony Powell
- Cover artist: James Broom-Lynne
- Language: English
- Series: A Dance to the Music of Time
- Release number: 12
- Publisher: Heinemann
- Publication date: 1975
- Media type: Print
- Preceded by: Temporary Kings

Hearing Secret Harmonies is the final novel in Anthony Powell's twelve-volume series, A Dance to the Music of Time. It was published in 1975, twenty-four years after the first book, A Question of Upbringing, appeared in 1951. No other novel series is based on the formal pictorial principles as A Dance to the Music of Time. The book ends with a torrential passage from The Anatomy of Melancholy by Robert Burton.

== Plot summary ==
The book opens in the late 1960s. Nick and Isobel Jenkins let a caravan of four hippies from the Harmony cult, followers of the occult and spiritualism, stay on their land: their niece, Fiona Cutts, daughter of Roddy Cutts; Scorpio Murtlock, an intense young man, also described as "creepy"; Barnabas Henderson; and Rusty.

Jenkins muses on Ariosto's Orlando Furioso--specifically the section when Orlando's comrade-in-arms Astolpho travels to the Moon, to the Valley of Lost Things, to recover his friend's lost wits.

Kenneth Widmerpool has embraced counter-culture after his stay in the United States, and, disdaining the form of address "Lord Widmerpool", is now calling himself "Ken Widmerpool". He is appointed Chancellor of a new university, and during the opening ceremony, has paint thrown over him by students (the Quiggin twins).

Matilda Donners has established the Magnus Donners Memorial Prize, awarded to biographies. She persuaded Nick to serve on the award panel by showing him and Isobel the photographs Donners took of Nick and friends 30 years before, portraying the Seven Deadly Sins. The other panel members are Mark Members and Emily Brightman, with Gibson Delavacquerie serving as secretary. In the fourth year of the award, the only suitable book is Russell Gwinnett's biography of X Trapnel. There is a complication, however: Trapnel and Gwinnett both had affairs with Pamela, wife of Widmerpool who is one of the trustees. Widmerpool has no objection to the award being granted to Gwinett, provided he can attend the award dinner with the Quiggin twins. He gives a speech denouncing bourgeois society, which is interrupted by the Quiggin twins setting off a stink bomb.

Nick meets Gwinnett at "The Devil's Fingers," prehistoric standing stones near his house. Gwinnett had attended as an observer a ritual of Murtlock's Harmony cult, an attempt to summon the spirit of Doctor Trelawney. They were interested in Gwinnett because of his necrophilia. Widmerpool has joined the cult, offering the use of his house, and a power struggle has taken place between Widmerpool and Murtlock. Fiona succeeds in leaving the cult and moves into Gibson Delavacquerie's flat.

Nick and Isobel attend the wedding of Fiona's brother, held at Stourwater, previously the home of Sir Magnus Donners, now a girls' school. Fiona has married Gwinnett and the couple attend the reception. Fiona spots the Harmony cult out for a run on the Stourwater estate, including Widmerpool and Bithel, and invites them to join the wedding reception. Widmerpool is in poor health, and wants to apologise to Sir Bertram Akworth, grandfather of the bride, a City colleague of Widmerpool, whom he had got expelled from school decades before for writing a love note to Peter Templer. Henderson sees an old boyfriend of his, Chuck, and decides to leave the Harmony cult, with Murtlock's permission. However, when Widmerpool tries to leave the cult, he is refused permission.

Nick attends a centenary exhibition of Mr. Deacon's paintings at Barnabas Henderson's gallery. The latter is much improved after leaving the cult. Nick meets Polly Duport, who is marrying Delavacquerie, and her parents Bob Duport and Jean Flores. Bithel arrives, reporting Widmerpool's death. He died from over-exertion trying to lead one of the cult's runs while in poor health. Murtlock ordered his belongings burnt, but Bithel rescued the Modigliani drawing previously owned by Charles Stringham and Pamela Flitton. He gives this to Henderson.

The 'enchantments' Powell interlaces in this novel with their occult and magical association are more than metaphors but matters calling for serious consideration. Jewett has observed echoes of The Great Gatsby in Widmerpool's death.

Hearing Secret Harmonies is dedicated to historian and poet Robert Conquest.

On the fiftieth anniversary of its publication, Hearing Secret Harmonies was characterized in The Spectator as a testament to a lost era.
