= Patrick Alexander =

Patrick Alexander may refer to:

- Patrick Young Alexander (1867–1943), British aeronautical pioneer
- Patrick Alexander (writer) (1926–1997/2003), British novelist, thriller writer, journalist and screenwriter
- Patrick Alexander (poet) (1940–2005), Irish poet
- Patrick Alexander (author, born 1946), British writer resident in the United States
- Patrick Alexander (cartoonist), Australian cartoonist
- P. J. Alexander (Patrick James Alexander, born 1978), American football player
