= At Lady Molly's =

Book by Anthony Powell

- First edition cover
- Author: Anthony Powell
- Cover artist: James Broom-Lynne
- Language: English
- Series: A Dance to the Music of Time
- Publisher: Heinemann
- Publication date: 1957
- Publication place: United Kingdom
- Media type: Print (hardback & paperback)
- Pages: 239 pp
- Preceded by: The Acceptance World
- Followed by: Casanova's Chinese Restaurant

At Lady Molly's is the fourth volume in Anthony Powell's twelve-novel sequence, A Dance to the Music of Time. Winner of the James Tait Black Memorial Prize 1957, At Lady Molly's is set in England of the mid-1930s and is essentially a comedy of manners, but in the background, the rise of Hitler and of worldwide Fascism are not ignored. The driving theme of At Lady Molly's is married life; marriages – as practised or mooted – among the narrator's (Nick Jenkins) acquaintances in bohemian society and the landed classes are pondered. Meanwhile, the career moves of various characters are advanced, checked or put on hold.

The portrait of the aristocratic Tolland family is sourced in part from Powell's own in-laws, the Pakenhams.

== Plot summary ==
Of course you hardly ever meet intelligent people there... And you rarely see anyone whom I call really smart. All the same, you may find absolutely anybody at Aunt Molly's.- Chips Lovell

It is 1934 and Nick is working, without great success, as a script writer at a film company. He gets invited by a colleague, Chips Lovell, to a party at the home of Lady Molly Jeavons. There he learns that Kenneth Widmerpool is to marry Mrs. Mildred Haycock, a twice-widowed woman with a notorious reputation (she is somewhat insane, according to Nick). Nick subsequently has to endure having to lunch with Widmerpool, and fending-off questions from Widmerpool's prospective in-laws becomes, for Nick, a motif throughout the novel. Also re-encountered at Lady Molly's gathering is old Alfred Tolland.

A chance meeting by Nick with Quiggin (at a cinema where Man of Aran is showing) leads to a surprising and rather mysterious invitation of a weekend visit to the country. Quiggin and Mona Templer are staying in a cottage loaned to them by Erridge (Lord Warminster, eccentric head of the Tolland family). While there, they all visit the Tolland ancestral home, Thrubworth Park, for a frugal but eventful dinner.

Just as the meal is finishing two Tolland sisters, Susan and Isobel, arrive. A while later Nick meets Lady Molly's husband, Ted Jeavons, in a Soho pub and they visit Umfraville's nightclub. They encounter Widmerpool (suffering another bout with jaundice), Mrs Haycock and Templer.

In Autumn 1934 Jenkins becomes engaged to Isobel. Erridge, wanting to study conditions for himself, goes to China at a time when the Japanese army are undertaking offensive operations. Mona goes with him, ditching Quiggin. Widmerpool's engagement to Mildred Haycock is broken off in farcical and, to most men, crushing circumstances. However, Widmerpool remains undaunted.

- Adapted in part from material published by the Anthony Powell Society with consent

== Criticism ==
Tariq Ali, in what is really a defence of Powell and his work, doesn't comment about At Lady Molly's in particular but writes of A Dance to the Music of Time, "By the time he came to write the Dance, Powell's style had become almost antique, baroque – and that lifted the comedy to a much higher level than one finds in the early novels." Powell's early novels are described as witty whereas the "Dance" books are of a higher order because the style "had become much more reflective." Ali also remarked in the same article, "Coincidence plays an important part in the characters' many encounters. Yet, structured as art, the coincidences build up into a greater patterning."

Auberon Waugh took exception to this reflective style, complaining of the number of clauses in some of Powell's sentences and attacking the use of "the diffident double-negative" as well as the "'elegant' or dissociative inverted comma." He dismissed A Dance to the Music of Time, At Lady Molly's not excepted, with: "As an early upmarket soap opera, it undoubtedly gave comfort to a number of people, becoming something of a cult during the 1970s in the London community of expatriate Australians. Perhaps it afforded them the illusion of understanding English society, even a vicarious sense of belonging to it. If so, it was one of the cruellest practical jokes ever played by a Welshman." These remarks appeared in a piece by Auberon Waugh in the Sunday Telegraph 27 May 1990, "Judgment on a Major man of letters".

One such expatriate Australian Clive James, has been widely quoted (particularly on the back of any the sequence's British paperback editions) as holding the opinion that "The Dance...was the greatest modern novel in English since (James Joyce's) Ulysses."

Norman Shrapnel, in making a comparative literary point, at the same time attacks the "soap opera" idea, with the judgement: "He [Powell] lacks what Amis and most of the later English humorists have possessed – sentimentality. That would have destroyed the work."—sentimentality being the bedrock of the soap opera genre.

== Characters new to the series ==
- General Aylmer Conyers. Known immemorially to the Jenkins family. Perhaps distant relation to Nick's mother. Disliked by Uncle Giles who, typically, regarded the General as Inclined to think a good deal of himself and that he always knew the right people to further his career. A few years short of eighty and prospective brother-in-law to Widmerpool. Retired from the Army around his early fifties, shortly after marrying Bertha Blaides. Busies himself training Poodles to be gun dogs, learning the Cello, reading the latest literary fiction (Virginia Woolf's Orlando: A Biography- Uncle Giles mentions an episode from the general's career, arming the Palace eunuchs with rook rifles, which is echoed in the ambassador scenes of Sally Potter's 1997 film Orlando)- and studying psycho-analysis. Diagnoses Widmerpool as an intuitive extrovert... a classic case, almost and Nick as an introvert. Conyers is a member of the Honourable Corps of Gentlemen at Arms.
- Mrs. Bertha Conyers. Older sister of Mildred Haycock. A generation younger than her husband, General Conyers. They have one child, Charlotte – a rather colourless girl who marries a Naval officer in Malta. Bertha herself was one of six daughters of the late and not much lamented Lord Vowchurch, a rather grim practical joker. All six daughters lived their early lives in disgrace for none of them being a boy. Cousin to Baby Wentworth.
- Mildred Haycock, née Blaides. Nick suspects that she is probably insane. Younger sister of Bertha Conyers. A V.A.D. during World War I, Nick first sees her while visiting the Conyers flat with his mother towards Christmas 1916. Nick was then a schoolboy of ten and was much impressed when Mildred a young woman wearing V.A.D uniform, strode in like a grenadier. The next time he sees her he is at Lady Molly's. Mildred, who is twice widowed by then with two teenage children and has slept with every old-timer between Cannes and St. Tropez, walks into the room with her new fiancé- Widmerpool. During the war Mildred nursed at Dogdene where she met Lady Molly and also became close to Alice, the successive Lady Sleaford.
- Lady Molly Jeavons. Who could boast that my grandfather had ninety-seven first cousins and he was only three up my grandmother on my mother's side was an Ardglass, sister to Jumbo Ardglass and to the present Lady Katherine Warminster. She married Lord John Sleaford,- Chips Lovell's first Sleaford Uncle- at eighteen straight from the Ballroom. The marriage was childless. Whilst Lady Sleaford she was mistress of the magnificent Sleaford seat of Dogdene. The house was used as a military hospital during World War I. It was at this time that she got to know Mildred Blaides and also met Captain Jeavons. Lord John Sleaford died of the Spanish flu in 1919 and the title passed to his brother Geoffery- Lovell's second Sleaford Uncle.

Molly again met Cap. Teddy Jeavons at the car show at the Olympia and they later married. Living on, as Lovell surmised, about £100 a year of her own money with Jeavons not bringing in a cent the Jeavonses' kept open house at their home at South Kensington, a social no-man's land where one could meet all kinds (excepting working class types unless they were employees). It was at Lady Molly's that Widmerpool first met Mildred, Mrs Haycock. Nick Jenkins re-encounters Alfred Tolland and Mark Members there.

- Captain Teddy Jeavons. Lady Molly's second husband. Badly wounded during the war and awarded the Military Medal. Nick finds him intriguing although he finds in the last resort his company was exhausting rather than stimulating and thinks of him as having a mind seething with forgotten melodies, forever stirring him to indiscretion by provoking memories of an enchanted past. Mark Members, whom Jeavons asked about snooker, offered a Gold Flake cigarette and tried to sell a patent device, looked upon him with absolute horror. Widmerpool dismisses Jeavons as a failure and dull. Later it transpires that Jeavons had a wartime fling with Mildred Blaides and there is a strong hint that he again has sex with her while she is engaged to Widmerpool – an act that Widmerpool signally fails to perform.
- Alfred, Lord Warminster. Erry (short for Erridge, his first title) to his family, Alf to Quiggin. In his early thirties and most probably still a virgin. Lonely, socially inept, unkempt Left wing Peer. Frugal and stingy in personal interaction but free with his money to those social causes that he feels passionate about – the latter a trait which makes him very attractive to J.G. Quiggin and one that Mona Templer indicates that she aims to cure him of. Egotistical, worries about his health and used to having his own way. First mention of this character was in A Buyer's Market when his name was announced at the Huntercombes party.
- Lady Frederica Budd. Widowed. Eldest of the Tolland sisters. A lady-in-waiting and great friend of Mrs Conyers.
- Priscilla Tolland. Youngest of the Tollands and desired by Chips Lovell.
- Norah Tolland. A lesbian living with Eleanor Walpole-Wilson in some squalor at a flat in Chelsea.
- Susan Tolland. Turns-up with Isobel at Thrubworth and announces her engagement to Roddy Cutts (who looks into the Conservative Central Office once in a way).
- Isobel Tolland. A bit of a highbrow when she isn't going to night clubs according to Chips Lovell, Nick meets her at Thrubworth and they are engaged by the last chapter. Long legged and witty.
- Blanche Tolland. Regarded by the Tolland family as being dotty.
- Katherine Warminster. Sister of Lady Molly. Widowed stepmother to the ten Tollands. Lives at Hyde Park Gardens where life could be ruthless... but at the same time a curtain of relatively good humour was allowed to cloak an inexorable recognition of life's inevitable severities. To Nick's mind she has an unearthly, witch-like quality. A hypochondriac, she spends most of her time in her bedroom writing lightly researched histories of powerful women – Empress Maria Theresa of Austria her current subject. Lord Warminster had spent most of their married life fishing in Iceland or pig-sticking in Bengal.
- Smith the butler. Sole working-class character, discounting Quiggin, in the book. Lacks what Bertie Wooster would call the Feudal spirit. Slovenly, alcoholic butler to Erridge. Lady Molly borrows him to help out at South Kensington from time to time. Breaks the Dresden coffee pot and is suspected of drinking the gin.
- Chips Lovell. Twenty three or four and filling-in time at the script department of a film company where Nick works. Hopes to land a job on the society pages of a newspaper. Spends most of his time talking about his aristocratic cousins. Amorously interested in Priscilla Tolland.
- Heather Hopkins. Lesbian Cabaret performer. Plays piano with brutal violence but a great deal of facility. Appears in an act with Max Pilgrim at Dickie Umfraville's night club. Neighbour of Norah Tolland and Eleanor Walpole-Wilson.
- Mrs. Betty Taylor or Porter. Peter Templer's new girlfriend whose last name he can't remember although he regards her as rather a peach.

== Established characters ==
- Alfred Tolland. Brother-in-law to Lady Molly who teases him mercilessly about his nieces and nephews. Has unexpected depths.
- Max Pilgrim. Sings one of his 'sophisticated' comic songs (about a lesbian), accompanied by Heather Hopkins on piano, at Umfraville's.
- Miss Weedon. Much in evidence at Lady Molly's. Has a plan to cure Stringham of his alcoholism.
- Eleanor Walpole-Wilson. Living with Norah Tolland. Dislikes Heather Hopkins. Now in a position to feel sorry for Barbara (Goring) Pardoe due to problems in the latter's marriage.
- Dickie Umfraville. Now managing a night club of dubious legality in Soho. Divorced from Lady Anne Stepney who, he says, didn't like grown-up life- and who can blame her?.
- Peter Templer. Meets Nick at Umfraville's night club.
- Mona Templer. Living in a cottage with Quiggin on Erridge's Thrubworth estate. Bored, she fancies becoming a film star but runs off to China with Erridge instead.
- Mark Members. No longer writing Freudian-inspired verse and has thrown over his half-hearted adherence to communism. Now he has a variety of jobs of a literary kind which keep him in funds. Trying to move up in the social world which is why he regards the people he meets at Lady Molly's reception as being great disappointments.
- Quiggin. Now a well-regarded critic, although his Unburnt Boats remains a work in progress. He has become a hanger on of Erridge, Alf Warminster, whom he hopes will finance a new magazine with Quiggin as director. His Left wing bombast and odd regional idioms reach new heights.
- Widmerpool. Becomes engaged, contracts jaundice- again, see A Buyer's Market -, gets cuckolded and then jilted. Has a terrible and dramatic scene at Dogdene. Politically he is an Appeaser.
- Nick Jenkins. His twenty-eight-year-old (or thereabouts) self has become more assertive and outspoken when interacting with his contemporaries (although Widmerpool still renders him speechless).

== Themes ==
"What, then, is the central theme of the series? Creativity – the act of production. Of literature, of books, of paintings, of music; that is what most of the central characters are engaged in for the whole of their lives. Moreland composes, Barnby paints, X Trapnel writes, Quiggin, Members and Maclintick criticise and the narrator publishes books and then becomes a writer. What excites the novelist is music and painting, literature and criticism. It's this creativity, together with the comedy of everyday life, that sustains the Dance" Of the characters mentioned above, the narrator (Nick), Members—a poet as well as a critic, Quiggin and Barnby all appear or are quoted in At Lady Molly's.

At Lady Molly's is dedicated to Powell's son, J.M.A.P. (John Marmion Anthony Powell)

== See also ==
- Orlando: A Biography by Virginia Woolf
