= Frederick Bradnum =

British radio dramatist and producer (1922–2001)

Frederick Bradnum (5 May 1922 – 25 December 2001), was a British radio dramatist, producer, and director who penned over 70 plays and 140 dramatisations of novels for the BBC. Along with the likes of Tom Mallin, Jennifer Phillips, Peter Tegel, and Elizabeth Troop, he was considered one of the elite writers for the BBC. He was a recipient of the Prix Italia in 1957 for his script for No Going Home. Bradnum was a member of BBC North's Drama Department, and, according to BBC, Bradnum was "responsible for some of radio's classier adaptations".

== Early years ==
Bradnum was born in Fulham, though he was brought up in Roehampton. His father was a Battersea power station clerk, and his younger sister required special care, having been paralysed by poliomyelitis. He worked with an architect in the mid-1930s before becoming a council draughtsman. After joining the Army, he served in France (1939), Narvik (1940), Crete (1941), and Saint-Nazaire raid (1942), before transferring into administration with the Special Operations Executive. He reached the rank of acting major. His physical and psychological scars (periods of paranoia; one period of near-breakdown) stayed with him and may be attributed to being tortured by the Nazis.

== Career ==
"It must have shape, and an idea, which is worked out and brought to a conclusion. It must impose strong visual images upon the mind, and these should in turn suggest sound patterns..."

— Bradnum's approach to writing a radiophonic script.

A radio producer of drama from 1950 to 1961, he also directed 12 Bernard Shaw plays for the Third Programme and numerous plays by Henrik Ibsen. He played a major role, along with Donald McWhinnie and Desmond Briscoe, in establishing the BBC Radiophonic Workshop and wrote Private Dreams And Public Nightmares (1957) for it, which was the first radiophonic poem, featuring the voices of young actors Frederick Treves, Joan Sanderson and Andrew Sachs. This was considered an "early example of the experiments blending sounds and voices". In the 1960s, he produced a number of plays for the BBC's anthology drama series Thirty-Minute Theatre, including several Sherlock Holmes works. He continued to work as a part-time script adviser until 1986. Several of his plays, such as In at the Kill and Minerva Alone, were adapted for theatre and performed by the Hampstead Theatre Club onstage in the early 1960s. In at the Kill, a one-act play, is described as a "macabre little piece" by Theatre World. Another radio play, Goose With Pepper (1972), similarly was dramatised for the theatre by David Ambrose in August 1975. From the early 1970s to the mid-1990s, he produced mainly for Radio 4. His last play, The Terraced House, was written for Radio 4 in 1994. In 2003, BBC Radio 7 rebroadcast his 25-part BBC Radio 4 adaptation of Anthony Powell's A Dance to the Music of Time, which originally ran during the years 1979–82.

Bradnum was noted for his plays which were often centred on aristocratic folk or esteemed military personnel of the middle and upper class. However, some of his works differed in theme, such as one of his early plays The Cave and the Grail, which is based on Arthurian legend and set in coastal Norfolk. Keenly aware of his audience, Bradnum knew that northern listeners preferred family plays, northern settings, and adaptations of northern novels, rather than fantasy. The genre of the plays was also broad in scope including "mysteries, thrillers, social and satirical comedies, imaginative fantasies, and complex studies of character and relationships."

== Personal life ==
He married the Franco-Russian Anne Calonne ("Dada"; d. 1988) in 1951, and adopted her son David. He moved to Hove after his wife's death, and he died in 2001.

== Selected works ==
- The Heiress (Goetz) (1952)
- Danger (Producer) (1953/4)
- No Commemorating Stone (1954)
- No Going Home (1957)
- Chloroform for Mr. Bartlett (1957)
- Mr. Goodjohn & Mr. Badjack (1958)
- Hedgehog (with Stephen Murray) (1961)
- The Fist (1963)
- Pennicote's Truth (1966)
- The Long Walks - Journeys to the Sources of the White Nile (1969)
- Goose With Pepper (1972)
- The Recruiter (1973)
- The Wooden Shepherdess (1974)
- A Dead Man on Leave (1974)
- The General of the Dead Army (1974)
- Degas Cellini Ming (1975)
- Springers England (1976)
- Craven's Stone (1977)
- Creepers (1977)
- Viviette (1977)
- The Girl Who Didn't Want To Be.... (1978)
- Other Days Around Me (1980)
- The Man Who Lived Among Eskimos (1981)
- Cirrhosis Park (1981)
- The Autonomous Murder Complex (1981)
- I Did It Exceptionally Well (1983)
- Comrades (1983)
- The Bishop's Wife (1985)
- Game of Chance (1985)
- Deceptions (1985)
- Death of Robert de Cerilley (1986)
- You Are Not Alone in the House (1986)
- Death Duties (1987)
- The Odd Business at Narvik (1988)
- Dead Treasure (1989)
- The Old Pals Act (1989)
- A Secret Journey (1990)
- Roland's Afterlife (1992)
- Mother! or The Unwise Son (1992)
- What become of Peter Wish? (1992)
- The Terraced House (1994)
