= Patrick Alexander (author, born 1946) =

English-American author

Patrick Alexander (born 1946, Southampton, England) is an author based in Coral Gables, Florida. Educated at Queen Elizabeth's School, Barnet and the University of Sussex, he has published more than a dozen books spanning local and world history, literary criticism, wine and crime fiction.

== History ==
Building Paradise traces the development of Miami into a major international city.

Coral Gables: The First Hundred Years chronicles the founding and development of Coral Gables, Florida by George Merrick. The City of Coral Gables website described it as tracing "George Merrick's journey from a modest homesteader to the visionary founder of the 'City Beautiful.'"

Miami's Murders Most Foul is a compendium of notable South Florida crimes.

Boomer (2023) is a generational history of the post-World War II decades as experienced on both sides of the Atlantic. It traces the changing cultures in the West in this period, including the introduction of innovations such as personal computers.

Migration: Colonization and the Great Replacement Myth (2025) surveys human migration from prehistoric Africa to the present day. It is a contribution to Big History and tracks the movement of humans for the past 100,000 years, focusing on the past 10,000 years. It addresses the question of why and how human movements took place, including empire building and mass migration.

== Literary criticism ==
Marcel Proust's Search for Lost Time (Knopf Doubleday / Vintage Books, New York, 2009) is a companion guide to seven volumes of Marcel Proust's In Search of Lost Time, including character studies and an account of the Dreyfus Affair. The book is cited as a reference source in the Wikipedia article on In Search of Lost Time.

A Dance to Lost Time (Lanehouse Publications, Miami, 2022) compares Proust's sequence with Anthony Powell's A Dance to the Music of Time. The book is listed in the official bibliography of the Anthony Powell Society and is cited in the Wikipedia article on A Dance to the Music of Time.

== Wine ==
The Booklover's Guide to Wine (Mango Publishing, 2017) pairs wine with literature, matching wines to authors ranging from Shakespeare and Jane Austen to Hemingway and Fitzgerald. The book is cited as a reference source in the Wikipedia article on Wine in China, in the section on Ningxia wine.

== Bibliography ==
=== Crime fiction ===
- The Nigerian Letter (2015)
- Death by Water: The Cuban Connection (Greenhaven Trilogy #1, 2017)
- Death on the Eighth: The Flagler Connection (Greenhaven Trilogy #2, 2016)
- Dead Naked: The Russian Connection (Greenhaven Trilogy #3, 2018)

=== History ===
- Building Paradise: The Developing Story of Miami (2022)
- Coral Gables: The First Hundred Years (2024)
- Miami's Murders Most Foul: South Florida Tales (2019)
- Boomer: The Generation 1946–2024 (2023)
- Migration: Colonization and the Great Replacement Myth (2025)

=== Literary criticism ===
- Marcel Proust's Search for Lost Time (Knopf Doubleday / Vintage Books, New York, 2009)
- A Dance to Lost Time: Proust and Powell Compared (Lanehouse Publications, Miami, 2022)

=== Wine ===
- The Booklover's Guide to Wine (Mango Publishing, 2017)
