= Denis Capel-Dunn =

British lawyer and military bureaucrat (1903–1945)

Denis Cuthbert Capel-Dunn OBE (1903 – 4 July 1945) was a British lawyer and military bureaucrat immortalised by Anthony Powell in many aspects of the character of Kenneth Widmerpool, the anti-hero of Powell's A Dance to the Music of Time sequence of novels. Capel-Dunn served as secretary to the Joint Intelligence Committee (JIC) between 1943 and 1945.

== Career ==
The son of a consular clerk in Leipzig, where he was born, Capel-Dunn attended Beaumont College, a Jesuit public school in Old Windsor, until 1921, and thereafter at Trinity College, Cambridge. He was private secretary to Lord Lloyd, then spent three years in Persia and was at HM Legation in Havana before being called to the Bar. He became Secretary to the Air Transport Authority and worked on the inquiry into the loss of HMS Thetis.

He was commissioned into the Essex Regiment as a Territorial Army officer. In 1940 he joined the offices of the War Cabinet and Ministry of Defence. He became assistant secretary and then secretary of the Joint Intelligence Committee and finally head of the Joint Staff Secretariat. In this capacity he attended the conferences at Moscow and Yalta. He rose rapidly during the World War II to the rank of Lieutenant Colonel in the Intelligence Corps. He was awarded an OBE in 1944.

Powell served under him whilst on attachment to the Cabinet Office for nine weeks in 1943. When Powell, an acting major, asked to be retained in his post for a further fortnight in order that his rank might become substantive, Capel-Dunn dismissed the request on the grounds that "My nerves wouldn't stand it".

Noel Annan recorded Capel-Dunn's role in the JIC, noting that "as the youngest of the JIC members, and a civilian, it took [its chairman] Cavendish-Bentinck time and patience to galvanise his colleagues, and only when Churchill spoke could he at last set up a secretariat under an elusive, secretive barrister, Denis Capel-Dunn, and impose some sort of discipline upon them." Capel-Dunn was to remain secretary of the JIC until the end of hostilities, after which he presided over a post-war review of intelligence published for classified circulation under his name in 1945.

Capel-Dunn's report proved formative to the post-war shape of the UK's intelligence community. Amongst its most significant features were proposals for a 'Central Intelligence Bureau' that would take on joint service tasks such as cartographic intelligence and the maintenance of geographical 'country books' that had previously been handled on a joint service basis under the authority of the JIC and economic and industrial intelligence on foreign countries handled by the wartime Ministry of Economic Warfare. In the event, the 'Central Intelligence Bureau' took shape as the Joint Intelligence Bureau (JIB), one of the forerunner departments of today's Defence Intelligence Staff. Another key feature of the 'Capel-Dunn' report was a proposal for the continuation and regularisation of wartime joint-service photographic intelligence arrangements that had operated as the Allied Central Interpretation Unit. Those proposals were eventually implemented in the form of the Joint Air Reconnaissance Intelligence Centre. The report also covered the continuation of the interdepartmental Signals Intelligence Committee that coordinated communications intercepts by the three armed services and the Radio Security Service with cryptanalysis and other signals intelligence analytical work conducted by Government Communications Headquarters (GCHQ).

An accomplished Whitehall in-fighter, Capel-Dunn over-reached himself when he attempted to take control of the Security Service (MI5). Appearing unannounced at their headquarters on 24 October 1944, he claimed to be acting on behalf of the JIC in an investigation into all sources of intelligence and their distribution. When asked by the Director-General for his credentials he was unable to produce them. Threatened with an enquiry of the Minister, Capel-Dunn withdrew and no more was heard of the investigation. However he achieved a revenge of sorts when, at war's end, he published (for classified circulation only) an assessment of intelligence operations.

Capel-Dunn died in an air crash off Newfoundland in 1945 when he was returning with other officials from the San Francisco Conference that established the United Nations. As the royal biographer Kenneth Rose has pointed out, had he not sacked Powell the novelist would probably have shared his fate. "As it was, the subordinate survived to make his boss immortal". His early death cut off a career that seemed set for a ministerial position in politics or as a Whitehall Mandarin. Powell attributes to Widmerpool a Life Peerage and chancellorship of a redbrick university.

He was married to Elizabeth/Betsy Hessey, daughter of Brigadier-General William Francis Hessey DSO (died 1939). They lived at Stowmarket, Suffolk. Their daughter Hester M. A. Capel-Dunn married Gerald Dacres Olivier, brother of the actor Sir Laurence Olivier.

== Personality ==
"Like Widmerpool, Capel-Dunn was a very fat, extremely boring, overwhelmingly ambitious arriviste. His conversations were hideously detailed and humourless", recalled Mr John Colvin, former ambassador to Mongolia, who was a member of the same club, the St James, in which Capel-Dunn was known as 'Young Bloody'.

Powell told Hugh Massingberd that "I only knew the Papal Bun for nine weeks, but he certainly made an impression. I've never met anyone so materialistic in outlook. But then, of course, he wasn't at school ['school' being Powell's shorthand for Eton] with me so he was only partly the inspiration for Widmerpool. Fiction isn't as straightforward as that."

== Character model ==
The novelist planted clues in the third volume of his autobiography that Widmerpool was based on Capel-Dunn, referring to the nickname of an unnamed officer under whom he worked briefly in the Cabinet Office during the war. This is The Papal Bun – "a play upon his double barrelled surname, creed, demeanour, personal appearance ... a never failing source of laughter."

Kenneth Rose discovered that the historian Desmond Seward had managed to deduce Widmerpool's identity. This Rose put to Powell, who, in his elliptical way, replied: "My impression is that Seward, a most amusing fellow, is on to something there ...". The identification of Widmerpool as based upon Denis Cuthbert Capel-Dunn was then confirmed in Powell's Journals.

A Dance to the Music of Time is not a Roman à clef, and Widmerpool's career is not synonymous with that of Capel-Dunn. Indeed, pre-War episodes owe something to other sources, as do Widmerpool's later career as a spy, university chancellor and cult member. Unlike Widmerpool, Capel-Dunn was never promoted to full colonel, possibly on account of fears of the position he might then assume in the Intelligence Corps.

In the Channel Four TV adaptation of the novels Widmerpool was played by the Shakespearean actor Simon Russell Beale who was said to bear a resemblance to Capel-Dunn. Russell Beale was subsequently elected President of the Anthony Powell Society, an office he held until 2011.
