= Donald McWhinnie =

English television and radio director (1920–1987)

Donald McWhinnie (16 October 1920 – 8 October 1987) was a British BBC executive and later a radio, television, and stage director.

Educated at Rotherham Grammar School, McWhinnie worked for the BBC in administrative roles in the 1940s and 1950s and was drama Script Editor from 1951 to 1953. In the later 1950s, he became a radio director, and from the 1960s to the 1980s he was a director of television drama.

In the 1950s, McWhinnie collaborated with Daphne Oram, Desmond Briscoe and Frederick Bradnum on Private Dreams and Public Nightmares. Broadcast on the Third Programme on 7th October 1957, it was described by McWhinnie in his on air introduction as a "radiophonic poem" - the first time the BBC had used the term "radiophonic". In 1988, it was re-broadcast on BBC Radio 3 and credited in the Radio Times as "the final step on the road to the formation" of the BBC Radiophonic Workshop. In McWhinnie's four-minute-long on air introduction to the broadcast, he described the programme as an "experiment", noting that through manipulating recordings they were able to create "sounds which no one has ever heard before."

In 1959, McWhinnie directed a production of Embers, a radio play by Samuel Beckett. First broadcast on the BBC Third Programme on 24 June 1959, the play won the RAI prize at the Prix Italia awards later that year. McWhinnie wrote about his approach to radio drama in The Art of Radio.

In 1962, McWhinnie was nominated for a Tony Award for his screen version of Harold Pinter's The Caretaker.

In 1965, he directed the first Broadway theatre production of the Bill Naughton comedy All in Good Time, which opened at the Royale Theatre, New York, on 18 February 1965 and closed on 27 March 1965. It starred Donald Wolfit, Marjorie Rhodes, and Richard Dysart.

The inaugural episode of the BBC Television Shakespeare in December 1978 was announced to be Much Ado About Nothing, directed by McWhinnie and starring Penelope Keith and Michael York. The episode was shot at a cost of £250,000, edited, and announced as the first of the series, but then was suddenly pulled from the schedule and replaced with Romeo and Juliet. No reasons were given by the BBC, although newspaper reports suggested the episode had been postponed for re-shoots, due to worries that an actor's "very heavy accent" would be a problem for US audiences. However, there were no reshoots, the episode was abandoned and was later replaced by a new adaptation. It appears that the BBC management regarded the production as a failure.

In 1981, McWhinnie was nominated for the Laurence Olivier Award for Best Director for Translations.

== Selected credits as director ==
- BBC television adaptation of Evelyn Waugh's Sword of Honour (1967)
- Moll Flanders (ITV TV series, 1975)
- Wings (BBC TV series, 1978)
- Tales of the Unexpected, episode "William and Mary" (1979)
- Love in a Cold Climate (Thames Television serial, 1980)
- Mapp and Lucia (Original and best TV series 1985-1986)

=== Radio Plays ===
- 18.06.56 Giles Cooper - Mathry Beacon
- 13.01.57 Samuel Beckett - All That Fall
- 15.08.57 Giles Cooper - The Disagreeable Oyster
- 14.12.57 Samuel Beckett - From an Adandoned Work
- 13.01.58 Giles Cooper - Without the Grail
- 12.04.58 Robert Bolt - The Drunken Sailor
- 03.08.58 Giles Cooper - Under the Loofah Tree
- 23.11.58 Giles Cooper - Unman, Wittering and Zigo
- 09.02.59 James Hanley, Leo McKern, Jack MacGowran - The Ocean
- 24.06.59 Samuel Beckett - Embers
- 29.07.59 Harold Pinter - A Slight Ache
- 06.10.59 James Hanley - Gobbet
- 25.02.60 Harold Pinter - A Night Out
- 06.10.64 Samuel Beckett - Cascando
- 03.10.73 McWhinnie/Hilda Lawrence - The Hands

=== Stage ===
- 1960 The Duchess of Malfi (RSC)
- 1961 The Caretaker (Samuel Beckett) - Broadway
- 1962 A Passage to India - Broadway
- 1963 Rattle of a Simple Man - Broadway
- 1965 All in Good Time - Broadway
- 1967 The Astrakhan Coat (Pauline Macaulay) - Broadway
- 1983 Lovers Dancing, Starring Paul Eddington, Colin Blakely, Georgina Hale, Jane Carr - The Albery Theatre
