= The Acceptance World =

- First edition cover
- Author: Anthony Powell
- Cover artist: James Broom-Lynne
- Language: English
- Series: A Dance to the Music of Time
- Publisher: Heinemann
- Publication date: 1955
- Publication place: United Kingdom
- Media type: Print (Hardback & Paperback)
- Pages: 214
- Preceded by: A Buyer's Market
- Followed by: At Lady Molly's

The Acceptance World is the third book of Anthony Powell's twelve novel sequence, A Dance to the Music of Time. Nick Jenkins continues the narration of his life and encounters with friends and acquaintances in London between 1931 and 1933. The novel's dedication "To Adrian" refers to British portrait and landscape painter Adrian Daintrey, on whom the character Barnby is based in the novel, and reinforces the wide range of artistic references found in this particular work. Reviews of the novel were generally favourable and it was made a Book Society Alternative Fiction Choice.

== Synopsis ==
"Nick" Jenkins, working for a publisher and author of a novel, has now reached his late twenties. He also functions as the contact with his Uncle Giles, a former army man living on family money. Nick has been summoned to meet this uncle at the Ufford, an obscure Bayswater hotel, to "talk over business". Before that can happen, they are interrupted by Mrs Myra Erdleigh, a clairvoyant who is persuaded to give a card reading of their fortunes. She foresees difficulty in Nick's current business, as well as a future love affair, and that they will meet again after a year (all of which prove true). As he explains to his painter friend Barnby later, his employers wish to publish a work on the society painter Horace Isbister and have commissioned an introduction by the novelist St John Clarke, who has been slow to deliver it. Nick is also able to identify for Barnby a woman in whom he has become interested, the Left-leaning Anne Stepney, a daughter of Lord Bridgewater.

Later the death of Isbister makes Nick's business more urgent and he arranges to meet St John Clarke's secretary, the up and coming poet Mark Members, at the Ritz. Instead he is met by the Marxist writer J. G. Quiggin, who is engaged in a tug of war with Members over the secretaryship. He also encounters his former school friend Peter Templer and accepts an invitation to spend a snowy weekend at his house outside Maidenhead. Also with him in the car down is Peter's wife Mona, a former artists' model who is now an advertising icon; and Peter's sister Jean, Nick's former romantic interest, who is presently living separately from her husband. Jean rides in the back with Nick and they are soon in each other's arms.

It is clear that Mona is dissatisfied with her present unexciting mode of life. To distract herself, she persuades Nick to telephone Quiggin and invite him down for lunch. Another invitee is Templer's friend, Jimmy Stripling, who arrives in the company of Mrs Erdleigh and seems equally under her control. Quiggin, however, is left out in the cold since Mona becomes more interested in talking with Mrs Erdleigh. Consequently, Templer brings out a planchette on which they all take turns, eventually contacting an entity whose allusions to what is happening in the St John Clarke household so worry the initially sceptical Quiggin that he hurries back to London.

At a memorial exhibition of Isbister's portraits, Nick meets a number of older friends. Among other items they discuss is the news that Quiggin has finally displaced Members with St John Clarke, whom he is influencing politically, fuller details of which Nick learns after meeting Members himself in Hyde Park. There they witness a political demonstration in which St John Clarke is being pushed in a wheelchair by Quiggin and Mona, who has now left Templer.

As Jean and he are preparing to go to a Soho club later, Jean lets out that she had had an affair with Jimmy Stripling after her break-up with Bob Duport, her adulterous husband, and this threatens to destabilise her affair with Nick. At the club, they meet Barnby with Anne Stepney, overhearing whose name she is asked by someone at another table whether she isn’t "Eddie Bridgenorth's daughter". He turns out to be the thrice married Dicky Umfraville, now approaching middle age. Out of the blue, he invites the whole party to go with him on a visit to the society hostess, Mrs Andriadis, in Mayfair. Dicky's cheek carries the difficult situation off, but it is curtailed on the arrival of Mrs Andriadis' young protégé, Werner Guggenbühl. Later we learn that he displaces Quiggin with St John Clarke and turns him in a Trotskyist direction.

While attending an old boy's dinner at the Ritz with their house master, Le Bas, Nick encounters the odd man out from their school, Kenneth Widmerpool, who has been working for the Donners Brebner company but is about to move into the "Acceptance World" of financial futures. Puffed up with a sense of his own importance, he begins a long after-dinner speech on how to reverse the present economic slump that so enrages Le Bas that he has a stroke. Later, with the help of Widmerpool, Nick takes his alcoholic friend Charles Stringham home and puts him to bed. When Nick joins Jean that night, she mentions that her estranged husband is back in England and that this may cause difficulties.

== Critical responses ==
Some reviewers commented on the lightening of style in and less formal organisation of The Acceptance World. Writing in Encounter (July 1955), James Stern noted that it seemed "far more free, less ponderous than that of its predecessor. As The Music of Time marches slowly on, the quality of mercy, in one whose earlier fiction has often been called malicious, continues noticeably to grow." For John Betjeman in The Daily Telegraph (13 May 1955), "This novel does not have a 'plot' in the accepted sense of the word. It carried this reader along so easily that he dreaded coming to the last page. The narrative power is in the lifelike qualities of the characters. Whatever they do, however futile, is interesting."

However, Julian Symons noted some anachronisms in his review for The Times Literary Supplement (13 May, 1955). "Surely it was in the late, not the early, thirties that Surrealism was well enough known to be talked about in England, and that 'Trotskyist' became a general term of denigration?”

== Themes ==
Clarification of various themes is given in the asides of Nick Jenkins during the progress of this instalment of Powell's chronicles. The final section opens with an explanation of the book's title, The Acceptance World, and its wider significance:

I had been struck by the phrase. Even as a technical definition, it seemed to suggest what we are all doing; not only in business, but in fact all human activities. The Acceptance World was the world in which the essential element – happiness, for example – is drawn, as it were, from an engagement to meet a bill. Sometimes the goods are delivered, even a small profit made; sometimes the goods are not delivered, and disaster follows; sometimes the goods are delivered, but the value of the currency is changed. Besides, in another sense, the whole world is the Acceptance World as one approaches thirty; at least some illusions discarded. The mere fact of still existing as a human being proved that.

Quiggin's place in the fluctuating class system following World War I is hinted at in the allusion to H. G. Wells, as his entry into the Ritz is described as "obscurely suggesting a Wellsian man of the future". The point was taken up in a review in The Observer (15 May 1955), where John Davenport compares this aspect of interwar society with the already foundering social norms of a slightly earlier period, as described by Marcel Proust. "Since 1918 even the pretence of the old social order has gone… In the world of which Mr. Powell is now writing, the world of 1931-32, the fluctuating values cannot be measured against an establishment." Similarly, in the US, Kirkus notes that Powell "patterns a society and a generation with extreme skill, if with no discernible narrative and at an unhurried pace”.

Later in this second section of the novel, Nick's renewed meeting with Peter Templer and his sister Jean after the lapse of some time is made the occasion to focus on the overarching theme of A Dance to the Music of Time, based as it is on the painting of Nicholas Poussin, as new patterns of interaction emerge:

Afterwards that dinner at the Grill seemed to partake of the nature of a ritual feast, a rite from which the four of us emerged to take up new positions in the formal dance with which human life is concerned. At the time, its charm seemed to reside in a difference from the usual run of things. Certainly the chief attraction of the projected visit would be absence of all previous plan. But, in a sense, nothing in life is planned – or everything is – because in the dance every step is ultimately the corollary of the step dance, the consequence of being the kind of person one chances to be.

So far only the third volume of the eventual twelve has been reached. However, the ironies and displacements that are to follow, not only as characters grow older but as a consequence of the disruptions brought by World War II, are already foreshadowed in this commentary.

Francis Wyndham, writing in The London Magazine (1 September 1955), also takes up this point, noting the momentum that is now carrying readers from volume to volume and how "awareness of the fluidity of personality, of the numerous surprises that life provides in the shape of coincidence, new permutations in human relationships, situations that repeat themselves and yet are imperceptibly changed, is brilliantly expressed with no loss to the creation of solid, three-dimensional character. As more is discovered about his people, they become increasingly real, less and less easy to understand."

In his overview of Powell's novels, Understanding Anthony Powell, Nicholas Birns identifies a new departure at this point in the introduction of the Leftist ideologies as "one of the sequence's great villains and chief sources of amusement," though treated in a "gently or coldly ironic" way. But for the left-wing The New Republic this was no laughing matter, the reviewer there commenting that "What was intended as a subtle comedy of manners has become instead a mere pastiche of mannerisms".

== Art ==
Nick Jenkins, who works for a publisher of art books, is characterised in the novel by the gratuitous number of allusions to painting and sculpture that he makes. How Mona Templer, for example, "jumped out of her side of the car, and ran across the Sisley landscape to the front door"; or, in describing Jean Duport, that "once she had reminded me of Rubens's Chapeau de Paille. Now for some reason––though there was not much physical likeness between them––I thought of the woman smoking the hookah in Delacroix's Femmes d’Alger dans leur appartement." Allusions also occur in conversations between Nick and the painter Barnby, to whom he remarks that, in the world of portraiture, "St. John Clarke does not know a Van Dyck from a Van Dongen".

There is a particular emphasis on painters of the modern period, from the Impressionists and Pierre-Auguste Renoir's reduction of women’s flesh to "a material like pink satin", to the Fauves and the Cubists and the incorporation of fragments of shells and newspapers into the latter's compositions. The contrast in taste is also noted between William-Adolphe Bouguereau's once fashionable nudes in Classical settings and Pierre Bonnard's unidealised paintings of his wife in the bath. In terms of statues publicly available in London, there is the contrast between George Frampton's sentimentalised Peter Pan and Jacob Epstein's angular Rima, both in Kensington Gardens. There is also a passing reference to Bauhaus designed functional "steel chairs". Struck by the abundance of such references, Kingsley Amis even wondered, in his review for The Spectator (13 May, 1955), "whether Mr. Powell might not have been intending finally to pass under review the entire corpus of Western visual art".
