= A Question of Upbringing =

Book by Anthony Powell

- First edition (UK)
- Author: Anthony Powell
- Cover artist: James Broom-Lynne
- Language: English
- Series: A Dance to the Music of Time
- Publisher: Heinemann
- Publication date: 1951
- Publication place: United Kingdom
- Media type: Print (Hardcover)
- Pages: 230 pp
- Followed by: A Buyer's Market

A Question of Upbringing is the opening novel in Anthony Powell's A Dance to the Music of Time, a twelve-volume cycle spanning much of the 20th century.

Published in 1951, it begins the story of a trio of boys — Nicholas Jenkins (the narrator), Charles Stringham, and Peter Templer — who are friends at a nameless school (based upon Powell's public school Eton College) and then move on to different paths. A fourth figure, Kenneth Widmerpool, stands slightly apart from them, poised for greatness.

The title of the book had its origin in an incident in which Powell was a passenger in a car driven by his friend, the Old Etonian screenwriter Thomas Wilton ("Tommy") Phipps. Phipps and Powell found themselves driving straight towards an oncoming vehicle. Powell later recorded, "Seizing the hand-brake as we sped towards what seemed imminent collision, Phipps muttered to himself, 'This is just going to be a question of upbringing.'"

== Plot summary ==
A Question of Upbringing is more loosely structured than most of the rest of the Dance, taking the form of a series of vignettes over the course of several years.

The novel opens with the narrator reflecting on a view of some men working outside in the cold, and this leads to an eventual reference to Poussin's painting A Dance to the Music of Time. The narrator (Nick Jenkins) proceeds to recall his school days in 1921–22, when he, Charles Stringham, and Peter Templer had been friends. The character of a more senior student, Kenneth Widmerpool, is the subject of the initial remembrances; there is also a recollection of a visit from Nick's Uncle Giles and a practical joke played by Stringham on the boys' school housemaster. Templer and Stringham each leave school before Nick, but the boys remain friends. Nick meets Stringham's mother, the glamorous Mrs Foxe, and her husband, Cdr. Buster Foxe, "a chic sailor." After Nick leaves school, he also visits the Templers. There he sets eyes for the first time on Templer's sister Jean; he also meets the somewhat older Sunny Farebrother and Jimmy Stripling. Afterward, Nick encounters Widmerpool again while staying in France in order to improve his French. There, Nick first starts to consider Widmerpool as more than just a slightly farcical character when Widmerpool displays unexpected powers of persuasion in reconciling two of the other residents.

Nick goes to university, where he encounters Sillery (a don whose main interest is establishing connections and pulling strings), fellow students Mark Members and J.G. Quiggin, and former student Bill Truscott. Stringham also eventually arrives at university, but is not enamored with it. The friendship between Stringham and Templer is tacitly ended when Templer visits with some London friends, Bob Duport and Jimmy Brent, and ends up driving all of them (Nick included) into a ditch. Stringham soon leaves university, going to work for Sir Magnus Donners. The book ends in London. Nick has come to town to dine with Stringham, but Stringham backs out of the dinner in order to attend a party. Nick realizes that the connections among the boyhood trio of friends, while maybe never particularly tight, have now almost entirely loosened: each is going his own way, at least for a time, until they are again brought into contact one with another as part of the "Dance." The book ends with Nick meeting his Uncle Giles for dinner. Upon arriving at the restaurant, Nick observes that Uncle Giles is reading Some Things that Matter by George Allardice Riddell.

A Question of Upbringing is dedicated to Powell's son, T.R.D.P. (Tristram Powell).

== 75th Anniverary ==
In 2026 Secret Harmonies, an occasional journal of the Anthony Powell Society, marked the 75th anniversary of publication of A Question of Upbringing. In the essay, "Growing Apart: Recognition, Misrecognition and Maturity," Nicholas Birns views the novel as a departure from purely modernist and purely naturalistic models.

The anniversary issue includes a comprehensive analysis of the reviews of A Question of Upbringing.
