= Goose With Pepper =

British drama

Goose With Pepper is a radio drama by Frederick Bradnum. The play was originally written for BBC Radio 4, airing on 17 September 1972. The BBC said of it "Mr Bradnum's new play has that astonishing ease and easy depth that come with maturity; technique is undetectable; humanity, occasionally in the past veiled by self-consciousness, shines through, clear and warm." In August 1975 the play was dramatised for the theatre by David Ambrose. In 1975 it was also adapted into a television film by Ambrose and Troy Kennedy-Martin and directed by John Jacobs. It starred Kenneth More, Nigel Davenport and Maria Aitken. The British Film Institute summarizes the plot as "the peaceful rural life of a retired Brigadier is shattered by the arrival of the Company Sergeant-Major on his doorstep."
