= Casanova's Chinese Restaurant =

1960 book by Anthony Powell

- First edition cover
- Author: Anthony Powell
- Cover artist: James Broom-Lynne
- Language: English
- Series: A Dance to the Music of Time
- Publisher: Heinemann
- Publication date: 1960
- Publication place: United Kingdom
- Media type: Print (Hardcover)
- Pages: 229 pp
- Preceded by: At Lady Molly's
- Followed by: The Kindly Ones (novel)

Casanova's Chinese Restaurant is a novel by Anthony Powell (ISBN 0-09-947244-9). It forms the fifth volume of the twelve-volume sequence A Dance to the Music of Time, and was originally published in 1960. Many of the events of the novel were included in the television adaptation broadcast on the United Kingdom's Channel 4 in 1997, comprising part of the second of four episodes. There was also an earlier, more comprehensive, BBC Radio adaptation.

As with several of the earlier volumes, there is a time-overlap with previous books, the first part returning to the period before the death of Mr. Deacon. The ruined door of a fictional Soho pub, the Mortimer, provides the narrative frame of the volume. However, Casanova's Chinese Restaurant concentrates on a new set of characters, principally the composer Hugh Moreland, (based on Powell's close friend Constant Lambert), his fiancée Matilda, and the critic Maclintick and his wife, Audrey, whose unhappy marriage forms a key part of the narrative.

The interweaving of historical with fictional events is more notable here, and is used to illuminate the characters, as for example in Erridge's ill-considered departure for the Spanish Civil War.

Much of the book's reception was positive. Casanova's Chinese Restaurant is dedicated to Harry & Rosie- Henry d'Avigdor-Goldsmid and Rosie, Lady d’Avigdor Goldsmid.
