= A Buyer's Market =

Book by Anthony Powell

- First edition
- Author: Anthony Powell
- Cover artist: James Broom-Lynne
- Language: English
- Series: A Dance to the Music of Time
- Genre: Satirical, Philosophical novel
- Publisher: Heinemann
- Publication date: 1952
- Publication place: United Kingdom
- Media type: Print (Hardback & Paperback)
- OCLC: 54031610
- Dewey Decimal: 823.91
- LC Class: PR6031.O74
- Preceded by: A Question of Upbringing
- Followed by: The Acceptance World

A Buyer's Market is the second novel in Anthony Powell's twelve-novel series A Dance to the Music of Time. Published in 1952, it continues the story of narrator Nick Jenkins with his introduction into society after boarding school and university.

The book presents new characters, notably the painter Mr. Deacon, female acquaintance Gypsy Jones and artist Ralph Barnby, as well as reappearances by Jenkins' school friends Peter Templer, Charles Stringham and Kenneth Widmerpool. The action takes place in London high society in the late 1920s.

== Synopsis ==
As in the previous volume, A Buyer's Market introduces a variety of new characters without declaring what significance, if any, they will have to the rest of the series.

The novel begins with Nick Jenkins' recollection of meeting elderly artist Edgar Deacon at the Louvre in 1919, while Nick's father was participating in the Paris Peace Conference. Nick remembers Deacon's friendship with his parents after seeing one of his paintings in the home of diplomat Sir Gavin Walpole-Wilson.

In the present day of 1928, Nick Jenkins attends a dinner party at Sir Gavin's home. Daughters of the aristocratic Budd and Stepney families are present and, somewhat incongruously, so is Widmerpool. Nick is infatuated with Barbara Goring, a cousin of Sir Gavin's daughter Eleanor. Widmerpool weighs in on developments in Europe, expressing sympathy for Weimar Germany. Lady Anne Stepney asks Nick about Charles Stringham, who has been dating her sister Peggy.

After the dinner party, Barbara's entourage goes to a ball at the Huntercombes'. Barbara reneges on her promise to dance with Widmerpool, and pours a bowl of sugar onto his head after he protests. Nick and Widmerpool leave the ball and meet Mr. Deacon on the street. Deacon is handing out anti-war literature with a young woman named Gypsy Jones, whom Nick initially mistakes for a boy. The four of them then run into Stringham at a coffee stall. Stringham invites them to join him at a party held by socialite Milly Andriadis.

At the party, Nick meets his former university mentor Sillery, who points out several important guests and explains their relationships to one another. Industrialist Sir Magnus Donners, the employer of both Stringham and Bill Truscott, is present; so is Prince Theodoric, royalty of an unspecified Balkan country from which Donners wants to procure metals.

Truscott tries to make an introduction for Widmerpool, but Donners is not impressed. Gypsy becomes drunk and Widmerpool takes charge of bringing her home. Stringham moves to depart, spurning the entreaties of Mrs. Andriadis; Nick witnesses the end of their brief affair. Deacon quarrels with Max Pilgrim, a piano player who performs bawdy songs, and Mrs. Andriadis throws him out. Nick returns to his flat and finds Uncle Giles waiting for him, wanting to discuss the trust.

Nick visits Mr. Deacon's shop and encounters Ralph Barnby, a painter around Nick's age renting rooms on the upper floor. Barnby tells Nick about his affair with Baby Wentworth, who is also seeing Donners. Nick learns that Gypsy Jones lives above the shop as well. Barnby has much more experience with women than Nick, and the two become fast friends.

Come summer, Nick visits the country home of the Walpole-Wilsons, who then take him to a castle, Stourwater, recently purchased by Donners. Nick learns that Widmerpool has found a job with Donners despite earlier ambivalence, and is expected at the party later. Nick dines next to Jean (Templer) Duport, his former love interest, and learns that she and her husband own the house at which Mrs. Andriadis threw her party. Stringham and Truscott are present and lead a tour of the castle's dungeons, where Donners remarks "I think this is where we should put the girls who don't behave."

Widmerpool arrives discreetly and confides to Nick that he found a doctor after learning Gypsy was pregnant. Nick accepts an invite to dine with Widmerpool and his mother in London at a later date. Widmerpool crashes his car into a large stone urn outside the castle.

Nick attends Stringham's wedding to Peggy Stepney. Back at Mr. Deacon's shop, Gypsy mocks Widmerpool's naivete in paying for her operation. Deacon dies after a fall at his birthday party, and Nick attends the funeral. He spies Max Pilgrim among the mourners.

Nick goes to the shop, where Barnby cuts him for a date with Baby Wentworth. Gypsy returns, dressed as Eve for a party that night. Nick loses his virginity with her and hurries away to Widmerpool's flat. Sir Gavin Walpole-Wilson's sister is present at the dinner, and announces Barbara Goring's engagement to a professional soldier whom Nick met briefly on that night at the Huntercombes'.

After an awkward dinner, Nick and Widmerpool retire to the parlour to talk privately. Widmerpool admits he feels let down by the engagement, and asks Nick to call him by his first name henceforth. Unaware of what has just transpired above Deacon's, Widmerpool asks Nick not to mention Gypsy again, and declares he will never allow a woman to come before his work.

A Buyer's Market is dedicated to Sir Osbert Lancaster and first wife, Karen.
