= A Dance to the Music of Time =

12-volume book series by Anthony Powell

A Dance to the Music of Time is a 12-volume roman-fleuve by English writer Anthony Powell, published between 1951 and 1975 to critical acclaim. The story is an often comic examination of movements and manners, power and passivity in English political, cultural and military life in the mid-20th century. The books were inspired by the painting of the same name by French artist Nicolas Poussin.

The sequence is narrated by Nicholas Jenkins. At the beginning of the first volume, Jenkins falls into a reverie while watching snow descending on a coal brazier. This reminds him of "the ancient world—legionaries ... mountain altars ... centaurs ..." These classical projections introduce the account of his schooldays, which opens A Question of Upbringing. Over the course of the following volumes, he recalls the people he met over the previous half a century and the events, often small, that reveal their characters. Jenkins's personality is unfolded slowly, and often elliptically, over the course of the novels.

Time magazine included the novel in its list of the 100 best English-language novels from 1923 to 2005. The editors of Modern Library ranked the work as 43rd-greatest English-language novel of the 20th century. The BBC ranked the novel 36th on its list of the 100 greatest British novels. In 2019 Christopher de Bellaigue wrote in The Nation that A Dance to the Music of Time is "perhaps the supreme London novel of the 20th century, an examination of the human behavior that defines the upper echelons of this brash, resilient, often pitiless place."

== Inspiration ==
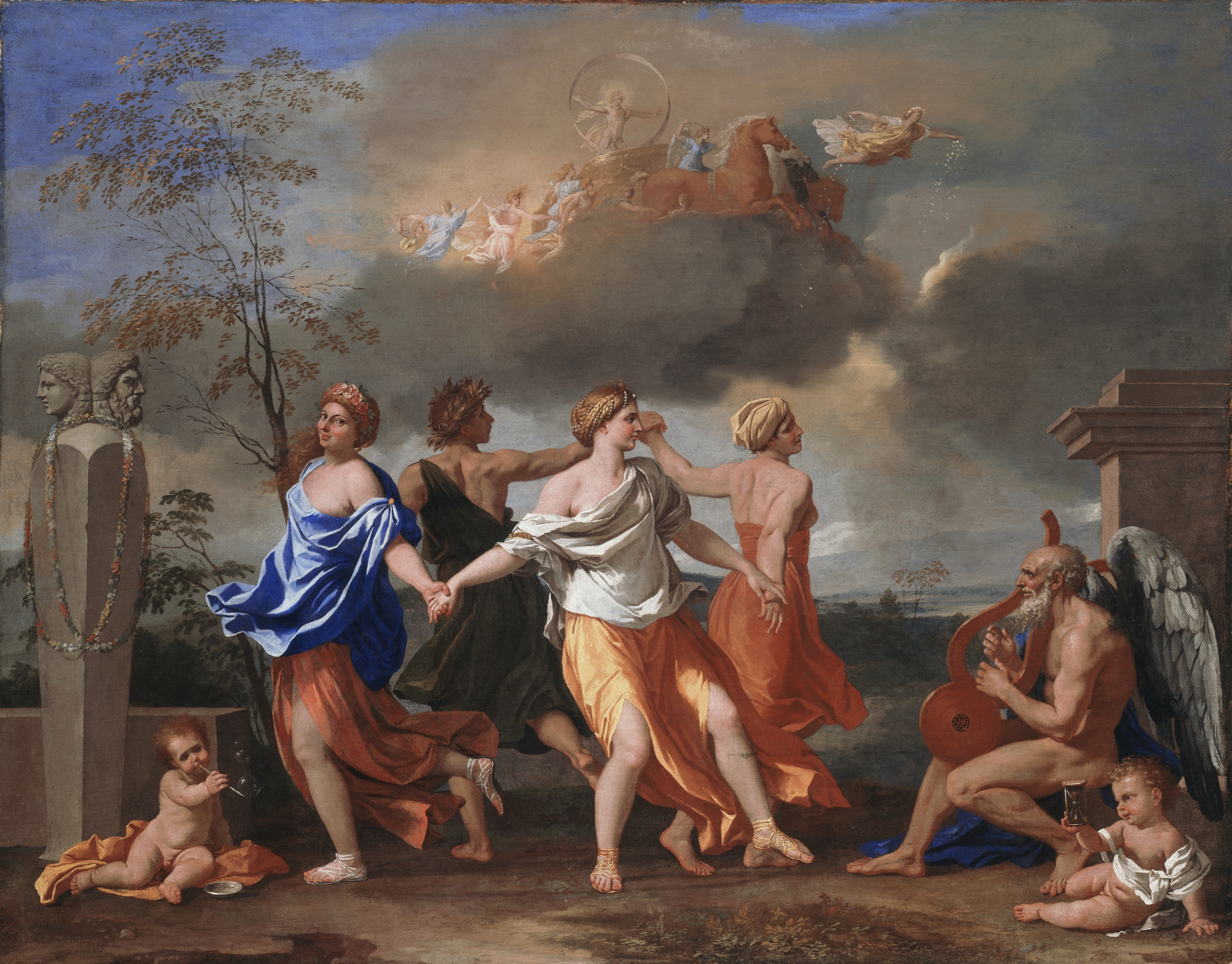
Poussin's painting, c. 1636, which gives its name to Powell's sequence of novels, Wallace Collection, London

Jenkins reflects on the Poussin painting in the first two pages of A Question of Upbringing:

These classical projections, and something from the fire, suddenly suggested Poussin's scene in which the Seasons, hand in hand and facing outward, tread in rhythm to the notes of the lyre that the winged and naked greybeard plays. The image of Time brought thoughts of mortality: of human beings, facing outward like the Seasons, moving hand in hand in intricate measure, stepping slowly, methodically sometimes a trifle awkwardly, in evolutions that take recognisable shape: or breaking into seemingly meaningless gyrations, while partners disappear only to reappear again, once more giving pattern to the spectacle: unable to control the melody, unable, perhaps, to control the steps of the dance.

Poussin's painting is housed at the Wallace Collection in London.

== Analysis ==
Its 12 novels have been acclaimed by such critics as A. N. Wilson and fellow writers including Evelyn Waugh and Kingsley Amis as among the finest English fiction of the 20th century. Auberon Waugh dissented, calling it "tedious and overpraised—particularly by literary hangers-on". The work was more heavily criticised towards the late 1960s, seen as being old-fashioned. Long-time friend V. S. Naipaul cast similar doubts regarding the work, if not the Powell oeuvre. Naipaul described his sentiments after a long-delayed review of Powell's work following the author's death this way: "it may be that our friendship lasted all this time because I had not examined his work".

While the work is often compared to Marcel Proust, others find the comparison "obvious, although superficial", with its narrator's voice more like the participant-observer of The Great Gatsby than that of Proust's self-reflective narrator. Two essays by Perry Anderson demonstrate significant differences between the two writers. The comparative analysis, A Dance to Lost Time: Marcel Proust's 'In Search of Lost Time' compared with Anthony Powell's 'A Dance to the Music of Time' by Patrick Alexander explores the reception of the two.

Powell's official biographer, Hilary Spurling, has published Invitation to the Dance – a Handbook to Anthony Powell's A Dance to the Music of Time. This annotates, in dictionary form, the characters, events, art, music, and other references. She has also calculated the timeline employed by the author: this is used in the synopses linked from the novels below.

Bernard Stacey compiled a catalog and analysis of the poetic allusions in the novel. The various aspects of the novel-sequence are also analysed in An Index to 'A Dance to the Music of Time' by B. J. Moule, D. McLeod, and Robert L. Selig. Volumes 7-9 (The Valley of Bones, The Soldier's Art and The Military Philosophers), collectively known as The War Trilogy, are the focus of Bernard Stacey's War Dance.

In 2025, fifty years after Hearing Secret Harmonies was published, Alec Marsh wrote in The Spectator that it was a testament to a lost era.

== The novels ==
Published dates are those of the first UK publication. The narrative is rarely specific about the years in which events take place. Those below are suggested by Hilary Spurling in Invitation to the Dance – a Handbook to Anthony Powell's A Dance to the Music of Time. Dust jackets of the first editions were designed by James Broom-Lynne.

Order	Title	Story timeline	Published
1	A Question of Upbringing	1921–1924	1951
2	A Buyer's Market	1928 or 1929	1952
3	The Acceptance World	1931–1933	1955
4	At Lady Molly's	1934	1957
5	Casanova's Chinese Restaurant	1928 or 1929, 1933–1937	1960
6	The Kindly Ones	1914, 1938–1939	1962
7	The Valley of Bones	1940	1964
8	The Soldier's Art	1941	1966
9	The Military Philosophers	1942–1945	1968
10	Books Do Furnish a Room	1945–1947	1971
11	Temporary Kings	1958–1959	1973
12	Hearing Secret Harmonies	1968–1971	1975

== Principal characters ==
Character	Details	Historical inspirations
Nick Jenkins	Narrator	A cypher, everyman; Powell himself
Isobel Tolland	One of the Tolland sisters, whom Jenkins later marries	Powell's wife Lady Violet Pakenham, third daughter of the 5th Earl of Longford.
Kenneth Widmerpool	A mediocre student whose rise seems unstoppable.	Powell confirmed character inspired by Col. Denis Capel-Dunn, under whom he served in the Cabinet Office. Plus an element from Sir Reginald Manningham-Buller's schooldays. Soviet bloc connection may be intended to suggest Labour MP Denis Nowell Pritt.
Charles Stringham	Schoolfriend of Nick's. A romantic.	Drawn from Hubert Duggan, whose glamorous mother married Lord Curzon, Viceroy of India. Not, as is often supposed, based on Powell's friend and fellow author Henry Green.
Uncle Giles ("Captain Jenkins")	Nick's uncle, unreliable and usually untraceable.	
Peter Templer	Raffish schoolfellow of Nick's	based on John Spencer, friend of the author's.
Jean Templer	Peter Templer's sister; Nick's lover	
Bob Duport	Jean Templer's first husband, businessman	
Sillery	Manipulative Oxford don	Professor Sir Ernest Barker, and "Sligger" Urquhart. Not Sir Maurice Bowra as often suggested.
Myra Erdleigh	Clairvoyante	
Pamela Flitton	Femme Fatale Married Kenneth Widmerpool	Based on Barbara Skelton, tempestuous sometime wife of Cyril Connolly.
Mark Members	Promising poet	Peter Quennell, all-purpose literary personage, poet, and cultural historian. The name and the conference-going suggest Stephen Spender.
Maclintick	Music critic	Peter Warlock.
Audrey Maclintick	Married to and widow of Maclintik; later companion to Hugh Moreland	
Edgar Bosworth Deacon	Painter and antique dealer	Combination of Mr Bailey, an alcoholic antiques dealer, and eccentric bookseller Christopher Millard.
Ralph Barnby	painter	Adrian Daintrey, portrait and landscape painter.
Gypsy Jones	anti-war friend of Mr. Deacon, Communist Party member	
Dr Trelawney	Occultist	Combination of Philip Oyler and Aleister Crowley, self-styled Great Beast 666
The Field Marshal	Leader of desert warfare	Bernard Law Montgomery, 1st Viscount Montgomery of Alamein
David Pennistone	Major assigned to liaison work with exiled Allied governments	Alexander Dru
X. Trapnel	Novelist and parodist	Julian Maclaren-Ross
Russell Gwinnett	Biographer of X.Trapnel and academic.	
Hugh Moreland	Composer	Constant Lambert
St John Clarke	Passé author	John Galsworthy
Max Pilgrim	Entertainer	in the manner of Noël Coward inspired by Douglas Byng
Gibson Delavacquerie	Poet, public relations at Donners-Brebner	Laurence Cotteril, Poet/businessman Roy Fuller and also V.S.Naipaul, novelist from Trinidad
Scorpio Murtlock	cult leader	
Sir Magnus Donners	Magnate and government minister	Partly drawn from Lord Beaverbrook also from Desmond Morton
J. G. Quiggin	Marxist writer	
Erridge (Earl of Warminster)	Socialist peer; Jenkins's brother-in-law	The Earl of Longford, Powell's brother-in-law. Also Powell's friend George Orwell – lives as a tramp for a time, fights in Spanish Civil War, dies in his forties.

== Adaptations ==
The cycle was adapted by Frederick Bradnum as a Classic Serial on BBC Radio 4. In order to fit the material in, it was broadcast as four separate serials each based on a set of three books: the first three serials had six episodes, the last eight. The series were broadcast between 1979 and 1982. The cycle was adapted again as a six-part Classic Serial on BBC Radio 4 from 6 April to 11 May 2008, dramatized by Michael Butt and directed by John Taylor. The cycle was adapted as a four-part TV series A Dance to the Music of Time by Anthony Powell and Hugh Whitemore for Channel 4 in 1997, directed by Christopher Morahan and Alvin Rakoff.

Character	1997 TV series	2008 radio drama	1979 radio drama
Narrator		Corin Redgrave	Noel Johnson
Kenneth Widmerpool	Simon Russell Beale	Anthony Hoskyns; Mark Heap	Brian Hewlett
Nicholas Jenkins	James d'Arcy James Purefoy; John Standing	Tom McHugh; Alex Jennings	Gareth Johnson, Noel Johnson
Charles Stringham	Luke de Lacey Paul Rhys	David Oakes; Timothy Watson	Simon Cadell
Peter Templer	Jonathan Cake	Jolyon Coy; Ronan Vibert	Christopher Good
Jean Templer	Claire Skinner	Emma Powell	Jane Asher
Bob Duport	Nicholas Jones		
Orn		Dag Soerlie	Christopher Bidmead
Lindquist		Christian Rubeck	Eric Allan
Prof. Sillery	Alan Bennett	Paul Brooke	Preston Lockwood
J.G. Quiggin	Adrian Scarborough	Julian Kerridge	Gordon Dulleu
Gypsy Jones	Nicola Walker	Emma Powell	Susan Sloman
Suzette; Barbara Goring		Abigail Hollick	Josie Kidd
Erridge	Osmund Bullock	Jonathan Keeble	Alexander John
Mona	Annabel Mullion	Abigail Cruttenden	Tamara Ustinov
Myra Erdleigh	Gillian Barge		
Lady Molly Jeavons	Sarah Badel	Heather Tracy	Sian Phillips
Ted Jeavons	Michael Williams		
Lady Isobel Tolland	Emma Fielding	Zoe Waites	Elizabeth Proud
