= George Merrick =

George Merrick may refer to:

- George M. Merrick (1883–1964), American filmmaker, writer of Frank Buck's Jungle Menace
- George E. Merrick (1886–1942), American real estate developer in Coral Gables, Florida
  - SS George E. Merrick, 1944 American Liberty ship named after him
- George Merrick (rugby union) (born 1992), English lock for Tonbridge

== See also ==
- George Merrick Rice (1808–1894), American businessman and politician from Massachusetts
- George Merrick Brooks (1824–1893), American lawyer and politician from Massachusetts
- George Merrick Long CBE (1874–1930), Australian Anglican bishop and educationist
