= A Dance to the Music of Time (painting) =

Painting by Nicolas Poussin

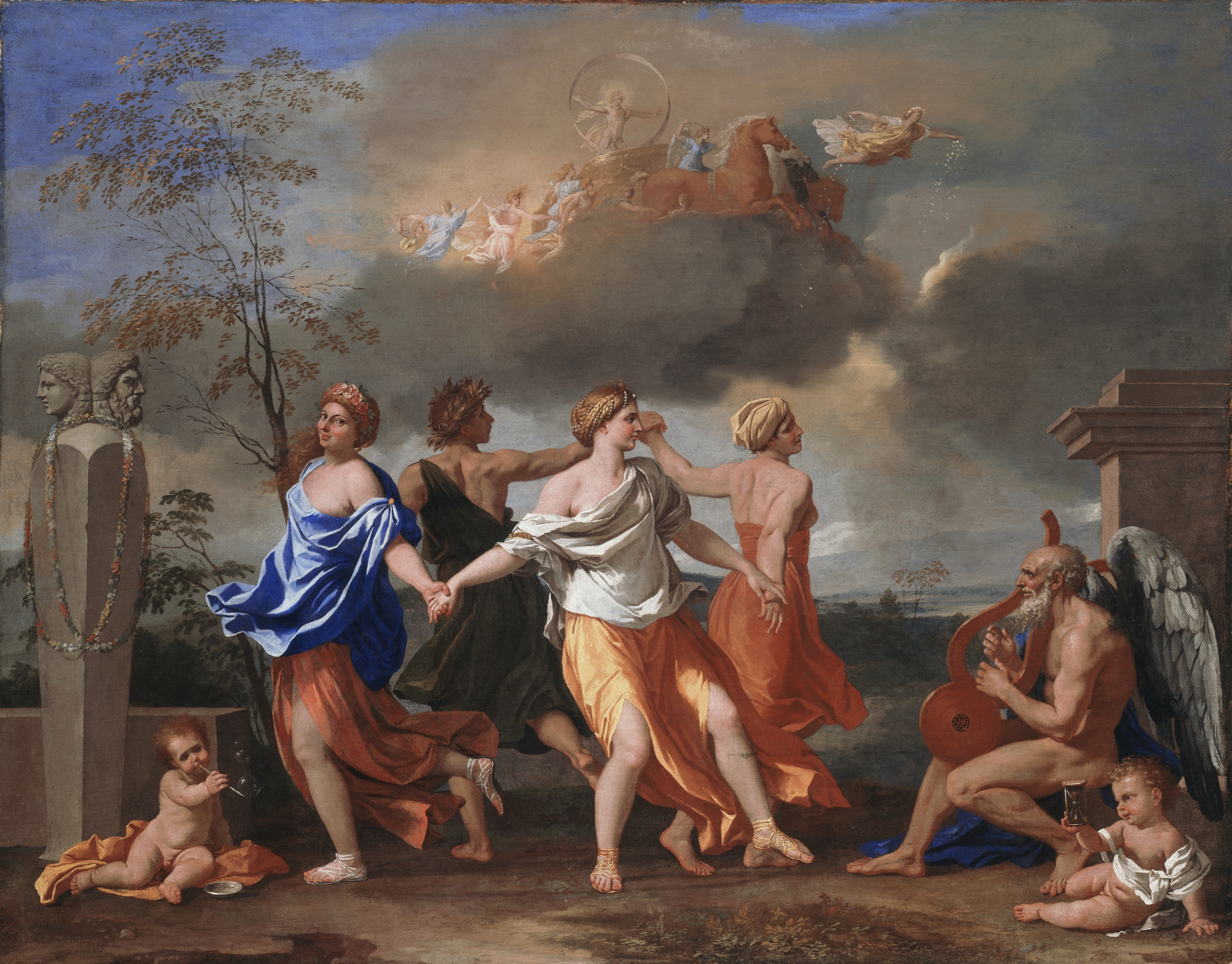
- Artist: Nicolas Poussin
- Year: c. 1634–1636
- Medium: Oil on canvas
- Dimensions: 82.5 cm × 104 cm (32.5 in × 41 in)
- Location: Wallace Collection; London

A Dance to the Music of Time is a painting by Nicolas Poussin in the Wallace Collection in London. It was painted between c. 1634 and 1636 as a commission for Giulio Rospigliosi (later Pope Clement IX), who according to Gian Pietro Bellori dictated its detailed iconography. The identity of the figures remains uncertain, with differing accounts.

The painting is well known for giving its name to the A Dance to the Music of Time novel cycle, though this title is first seen in a Wallace Collection catalogue of 1913. Before that it was given titles referring to the Four Seasons. In the 1845 sale it was called La Danse des Saisons, ou l'Image de la vie humaine. The Bibliothèque nationale de France lists it with three different French titles.

== Description ==
There are four figures, holding each other by the hand, dancing in a back ring circle, as Time plays a lyre on the right. The scene is set in the early morning, with Aurora, goddess of dawn, preceding the chariot of Apollo the sun-god in the sky behind; the Hours accompany him and he holds a ring representing the Zodiac.

According to Bellori, the subject was devised by Rospigliosi. The four dancers represented, beginning with the one at the back seen mostly from behind: Poverty, Labour, Riches, and Pleasure or Luxury. These represent a progression in human life, completed by Pleasure or Luxury leading to Poverty again. As the Four Seasons Poverty would be Autumn, Labour Winter, and so on. The suggestion of Anthony Blunt that, unusually for a group of the seasons, Autumn/Poverty at the rear of the group was male is now generally accepted, and the museum now describe him as Bacchus. This follows the story invented by Boitet de Frauville in his Les Dionysiaques that, responding to complaints from the Seasons and Time, Jupiter gave the world Bacchus and his wine in order to compensate for the miserable living conditions mortals must endure. André Félibien, the friend and biographer of Poussin, explained the picture in the same terms, except that where Bellori identified Summer with Luxury, Félibien said that it represented Pleasure.

These identifications are disputed by Malcolm Bull, at least as the original intention. He traces the iconography of the painting to the Late Greek poet Nonnus, reflected in the Hymne de l'Automme of Pierre de Ronsard. Nonnus' descriptions of the four seasons, as translated into French, are closely followed by Poussin: "on the left is Spring, with a garland of roses in her hair; at the back is Autumn, whose hair has been cropped by the winds but whose brow is wreathed with olive branches; Winter is next, with her bound hair and shadowed face, and at the front is Summer, dressed in white with ears of corn in the braids of her hair." Bacchus himself appears, in his double aspect as a young and old figure, in the herma at left. Bull suggests that Rospigliosi, an intellectual and author with a taste for allegory, invented the other interpretation "during or after its completion", while Ingamells feels that "Poussin was not unduly concerned with the precise identification of the figures".

There are several pentimenti, including the removal of a second, larger, tree on the right between Winter/Labour and Time.

The painting is in generally good condition, but has been retouched in places, including over the repair of a large L-shaped tear running right through the central group.

== Anthony Powell ==
At the start of Anthony Powell's series of novels named after the painting, the narrator, Nicholas Jenkins, reflects on it in the first two pages of A Question of Upbringing:

These classical projections, and something from the fire, suddenly suggested Poussin's scene in which the Seasons, hand in hand and facing outward, tread in rhythm to the notes of the lyre that the winged and naked greybeard plays. The image of Time brought thoughts of mortality: of human beings, facing outward like the Seasons, moving hand in hand in intricate measure, stepping slowly, methodically sometimes a trifle awkwardly, in evolutions that take recognisable shape: or breaking into seemingly meaningless gyrations, while partners disappear only to reappear again, once more giving pattern to the spectacle: unable to control the melody, unable, perhaps, to control the steps of the dance.

== Provenance ==
It passed from the Rospigliosi family to the Joseph Fesch collection in 1806, when it was taken to France for a period. It was then bought, along with several other paintings, by Richard Seymour-Conway, 4th Marquess of Hertford, in the great Fesch sale in Rome in 1845. It then passed to his son, Sir Richard Wallace. It was exhibited in the Art Treasures Exhibition, Manchester 1857.

== See also ==
- List of paintings by Nicolas Poussin
