= Anthony Powell Society =

International literary society

The Anthony Powell Society is an international literary society dedicated to the works of English novelist Anthony Powell. Membership is open to all interested in A Dance to the Music of Time and Powell's other works.

Powell was regarded by such writers as Evelyn Waugh and Kingsley Amis as amongst the greatest British novelists of the 20th century, a view supported by present-day critics like A. N. Wilson. He has been called the English equivalent of Marcel Proust. Powell's work remains the object of wide enthusiasm among a growing circle of readers.

The Society holds regular meetings in the UK (in the greater London region) and US (in the New York City and Chicago metropolitan areas), and less frequently in Canada, Australia, Sweden and Japan. It publishes a journal, Secret Harmonies and a newsletter, mounts biennial conferences, and hosts an Internet discussion group.

== Background and aims ==
The Anthony Powell Society was founded in June 2000 by a group of scholars and enthusiasts following Powell's death in March of that year at the age of 94. The Society's aim is to advance for the public benefit, education and interest in his life and works. It is registered as a charity in the UK.

The Society emerged from the Anthony Powell Resources website begun in 1994 by Dr Keith Marshall and its associated email discussion list arising from the interest in Powell stimulated by the dramatisation of A Dance to the Music of Time on UK Channel 4 TV in autumn 1997 and following his death. The Society's formation was actively welcomed by his late widow, Lady Violet Powell, and continues to receive the support and encouragement of his family and literary executors. Charitable status was granted in April 2003.

Currently, the Hon. Secretary of the group is Paul Milliken; the Chairman is Robin Bynoe; and the President is Ferdinand Mount. Past Presidents are Hugh Massingberd; Sir Simon Russell Beale; Lord Gowrie.

== Publications ==
The Society publishes a quarterly newsletter and a journal, Secret Harmonies, edited by Stephen Walker. The 100th issue of the newsletter was published in 2025.

It also publishes original works including guides, concordances and Anthony Powell's unpublished or out of print journalism and a photographic record of the collage a the|Chantry (the house in Somerset where Anthony Powell and his wife Lady Violet lived from 1952) A full list is on the Society's website.

== Exhibitions ==
A centenary exhibition in commemoration of Powell's life and work was held at the Wallace Collection, London, from November 2005 to February 2006. Smaller exhibitions were held during 2005 and 2006 at Eton College; Cambridge University; the Grolier Club in New York City, and Georgetown University in Washington, DC.

== Website ==
The Society hosts a comprehensive website www.anthonypowell.org providing biographical information on Powell, a full bibliography, resources and reference libraries, plus trivia and FAQs. Reports on the biennial conferences and exhibitions are also included. In addition to the conferences and meetings the Society organises, members around the world have also established regional groups and run local events. Through the email discussion list members have provided assistance with the DeProm translation of the initial volumes of A Dance to the Music of Time into Dutch.

== Conferences ==
Conferences addressed by prominent authors, critics and scholars are organised every second year. The first in 2001 was held at Powell's public school, Eton College. The second, in 2003, was hosted by Balliol College, Oxford, from which he graduated. The third at the Wallace Collection, London, the home of the painting from which Powell's masterwork derives its name, was held in December 2005 to coincide with a major exhibition to mark the centenary of his birth.

The fourth biennial Anthony Powell Conference was held on 8 September 2007 at the University of Bath, UK. The fifth conference was held in September 2009 in Washington, DC. The sixth conference was held in September 2011 at the Naval and Military Club ("The In and Out") in London. The 2013 conference was held at Eton College, September 27–28, and the October 2014 conference was at the Fondazione Giorgio Cini, Venice. The April 2016 conference was held in York. The 2018 conference was held August 31–September 2 in Merton College, Oxford.
