= Peter Tegel =

Peter Tegel is a British translator of Czech–German descent. As a boy, he fled with his family from the Nazi occupation of Sudetenland, arriving in Britain where he studied at Balliol College, Oxford. He has translated works of German, French and Russian literature. In particular he is noted for his translations of the German writer Uwe Timm. These include the titles Midsummer Night, Headhunter, and The Snake Tree, the last of which won the Schlegel-Tieck Prize. Tegel has also translated the plays of Bertolt Brecht and Nikolai Erdman.
