= Oxford Symposium on Food and Cookery =

Annual weekend conference

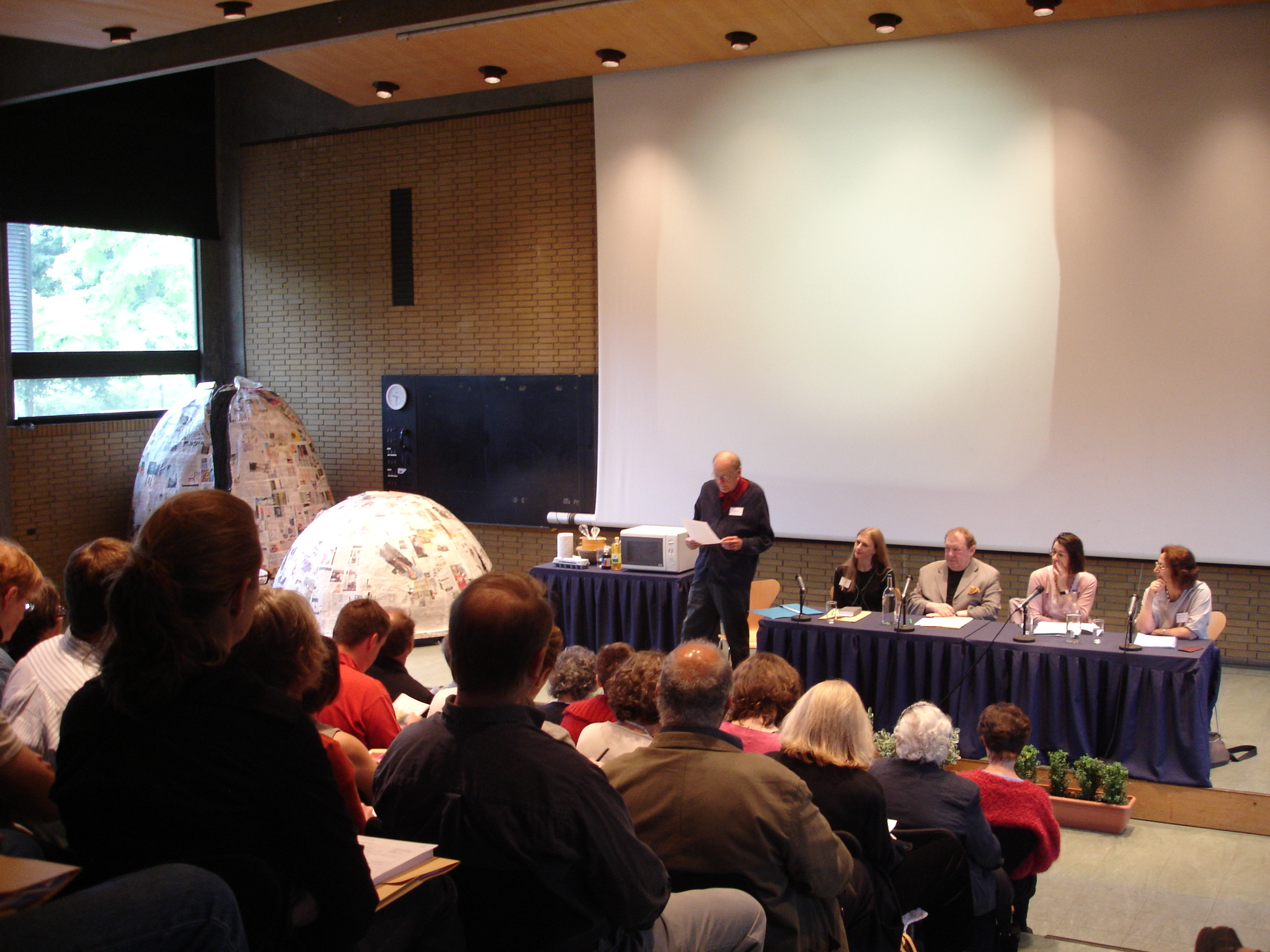
Harlan Walker speaking on "Eggs in Cookery", the 2006 theme. Panellists, seated, left to right: Jane Levi, Paul Levy, Marina Warner, Claudia Roden.

The Oxford Symposium on Food & Cookery is an annual weekend conference at which academics, food writers, cooks, and others with an interest in food and culture meet to discuss current issues in food studies and food history.

== Overview ==
The Symposium has taken place every year since 1983, with the proceedings published in an annual volume about a year later. Since 2006 the annual venue has been St Catherine's College, Oxford. The Oxford Symposium has been a Charitable Trust since January 2003. Influential in its field, the Oxford Symposium is the oldest such annual meeting in the world, though a series of scientific conferences on the anthropology and ethnology of food began in the 1970s.

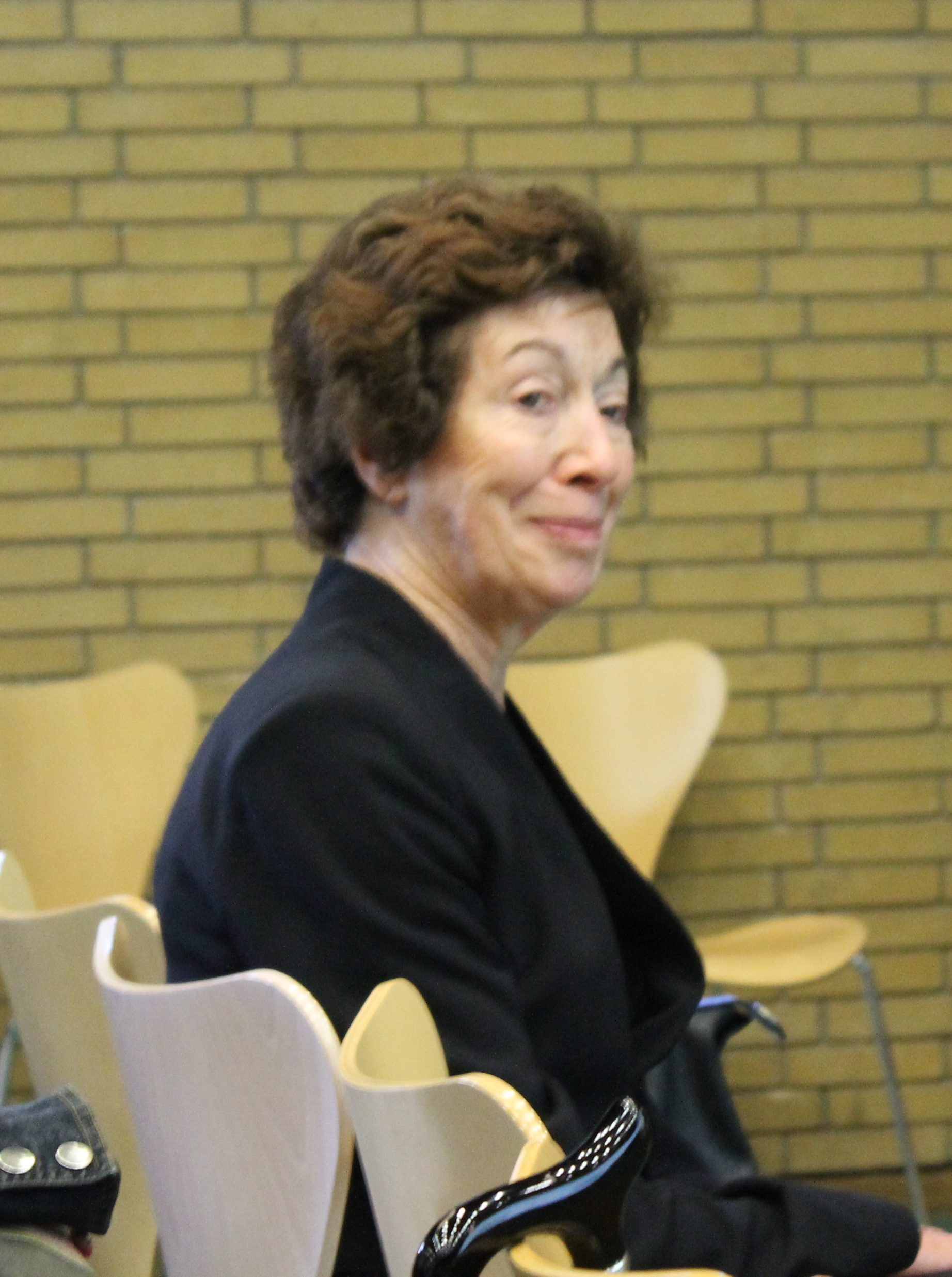
The publisher Jill Norman, a participant since 1979

The Oxford Symposium is a registered charity in Britain, with a group of distinguished Trustees, and there is a support group called Friends of the Oxford Symposium.

== "Science and Cookery": the 1979 seminars ==
The origin of the Symposium is traced to a series of three historical seminars on science and cookery arranged in 1979 by the scholar and former diplomat Alan Davidson (who was Alistair Horne Research Fellow at St Antony's College, Oxford for 1978/79) and sponsored by Theodore Zeldin, historian of France and a fellow of St Antony's. Zeldin had asked Davidson: "Tell me ... how do you propose to make manifest to the other members of the college your presence here?" The seminars were the answer. About twenty people attended on each occasion. The title of the first seminar, on 4 May 1979, was that of Davidson's fellowship, "Food and Cookery: the Impact of Science in the Kitchen". Academic disciplines represented ranged from the history of medicine to mathematics and French literature; Nicholas Kurti, Professor Emeritus of Physics at Oxford, was among them, and some of the 21 participants were not academics at all. Elizabeth David was among them, though she was reported to be "ambivalent at best" about the value of this academic approach to food. Also present were David's publisher Jill Norman, Anne Willan, Paul Levy and Richard Olney.

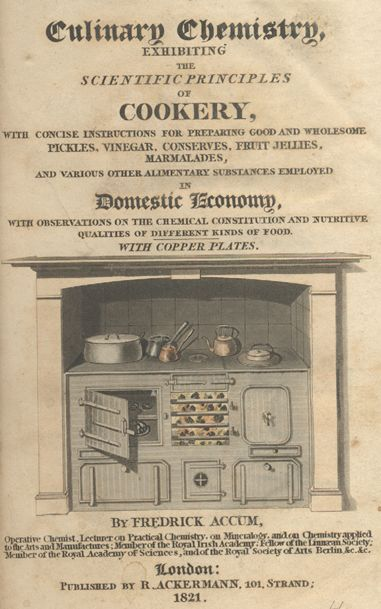
Friedrich Accum's Culinary Chemistry (1821), subject of the seminar on 11 May 1979.

The second seminar, a week later, focused on 19th century research on food chemistry, notably Friedrich Accum's Culinary Chemistry (1821) and the writings of Justus Liebig. The third meeting became a general discussion of cookery books in their historical context. On this occasion Elizabeth David enunciated the rule-of-thumb that it takes a generation (a minimum of 25 years) for a newly devised dish to pass from the kitchen to the written record. Claudia Roden joined the group on 11 May; by 18 May participants included Jane Grigson, Elizabeth Lambert Ortiz, Sri Owen and the Dutch food writers Berthe Meijer and Titia Bodon.

== "Cookery Books": the 1980 symposium ==
The next event in the series was a one-day meeting at St Antony's College in May 1980, chaired by Davidson and Zeldin. Participants, numbering nearly seventy, included many from overseas. The topic, the history of cookery books, had been prefigured in a brief article by Davidson, published in the first issue of the food history journal, Petits Propos Culinaires, in 1979. Speakers included Kai Brodersen, then at St John's College, Oxford, on cookery writing in Europe before the era of the printed book, and Claudia Roden on Islamic cookery manuscripts. The event was "best described as a symposium, since one attractive feature of it was that everyone brought food they had prepared themselves". Culinary contributions by Sonia Blech and Josephine Bacon were noted; Nicholas Kurti served Bombe Allotropique (Graphite-Diamant), a dish he had invented 25 years earlier at the annual Diamond Conference to celebrate the production of artificial diamonds at the General Electric Research Laboratory in Schenectady. The proceedings were not published in volume form, but one paper appeared in Petits Propos Culinaires no. 5 and three more in no. 6.

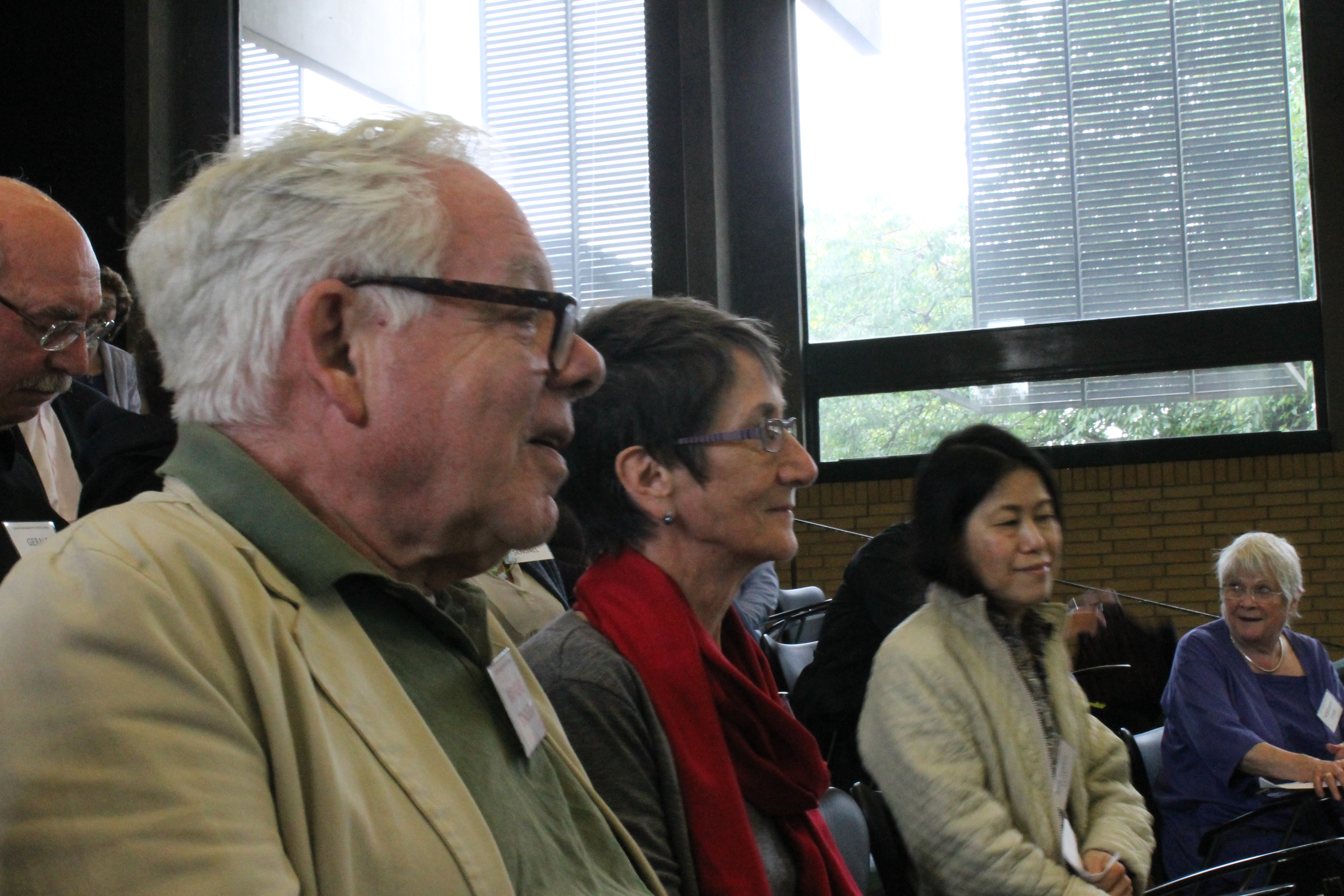
Ray Sokolov (foreground) at a plenary session

== "National and Regional Styles of Cookery": the 1981 symposium ==
The first full symposium, announced in October 1980, took place over two days in September 1981. There were nearly 150 participants, including 12 from the United States and seven from France: the latter included Jean-Louis Flandrin and Françoise Sabban. The majority were food writers, academics in food studies, publishers and journalists; there were few chefs. Plenary sessions took place on the first day, and papers had been circulated in advance. Participants split into three groups for the sessions on the second day, which were then summarized by rapporteurs in a final plenary. Maria Johnson, speaking on "North Balkan Food Past and Present", showed photographs of two models found in archaeological excavations in Bulgaria and claimed to be as much as 7,000 years old, one of a bread oven and one of a loaf decorated with impressions of acorns. The archaeologist Helen M. Leach spoke on "Cooking Without Pots" in prehistoric and traditional Polynesian cuisine; Raymond Sokolov, American cookery writer, discussed Southern cooking, describing it as "the major surviving native cuisine in the USA" and defending the popularity of deep frying, "an ideal method for the restaurateur". Speakers in Near Eastern cuisines included Charles Perry, editor on the Los Angeles Times, who discussed "Three Medieval Arabic Cook Books". R. E. F. Smith, professor of Russian at Birmingham, was one of two speakers on the history of Russian food. There was a session in which symposiasts attempted, but failed, to devise a test for distinguishing bogus from authentic regional styles of cookery, a question that was to be taken up again in the 2005 symposium, Authenticity in the Kitchen. The 1981 proceedings were published in volume form, the first occasion on which this was done.

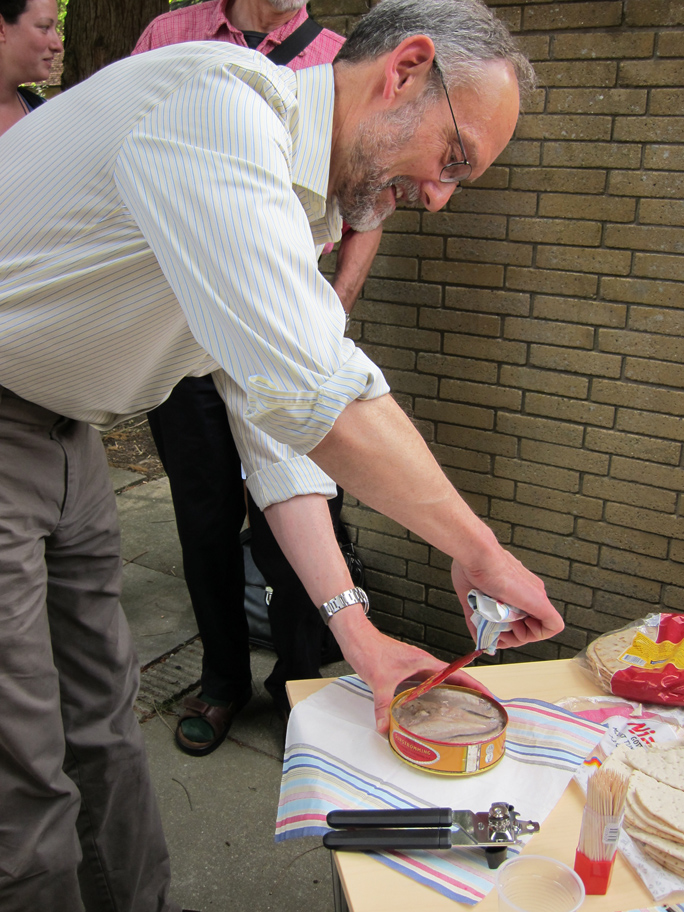
Harold McGee tastes surstromming (Swedish fermented herring) during the 2010 symposium, Cured, Fermented and Smoked Foods.

== Annual symposia of the 1980s ==
The 1983 symposium, described by one participant as "solemn but light-hearted", had the catch-title Food In Motion. The theme was the migration of foodstuffs and cookery techniques, including the most significant single such migration event in history, recently studied in Alfred W. Crosby's The Columbian Exchange (1972). Other major topics included the historical significance of the potato in Ireland, discussed by the social historian Jillian Strang and the food writer Joyce Toomre. There was a discussion by Raymond Sokolov and others of the origins of nouvelle cuisine (in and around 1972) and cuisine minceur, the approach championed by Michel Guérard. Sokolov allocated the principal role in these innovations to Paul Bocuse, Fernand Point, Guérard's book La Cuisine gourmande and the work of the Troisgros brothers; he pointed out the close relationship between Japanese culinary tradition and nouvelle cuisine. At this 1983 symposium it was agreed that the event should repeat annually.

There is no published volume of proceedings corresponding to the 1984 symposium, which took as its theme "the ideal cookery book and recipe". Many contributions consisted of recipes "with comments upon their composition and their culinary possibilities", a form unsuited to reprinting in the usual volume format; some of the others were published elsewhere. Fourteen remaining papers appeared in a two-year volume, alongside the 1985 symposium proceedings, under the section title "Cookery Books and the Transmission of Recipes". The 1985 proceedings have the section title "Foodways, Science & Lore in the Kitchen", though the original symposium title was "Science, Tradition and Superstition in the Kitchen". Organised by Tom Jaine, restaurateur and restaurant critic, it was the largest symposium so far, with 150 delegates from Britain, many European countries, Australia and the United States. Among them it was possible to identify "six cooks/hoteliers, thirty-one journalists/writers, thirteen publishers/editors, nine historians, seven booksellers ... and twenty-three academics". The archaeologist Bruce Kraig traced the history of cynophagy in the prehistoric record and in anthropological reports. Aphrodisiacs were discussed by food writers and medical specialists, and at least one traditional aphrodisiac, Chinese three penis wine, was available for tasting. Unusual foods at the regular bring-your-own lunch included gravad lax and chocolate-covered garlic. The keynote talk was "Science and the Study of Food" by Harold McGee, whose On Food and Cooking: the Science and Lore of the Kitchen had been published in 1984. Anthropologists Gerald and Valerie Mars offered a classification of food scholars and enthusiasts on the grid/group scales developed by Mary Douglas. Their title was "Classifying Cuisines: Epicures, Isolates, Messmates and Cultists".

By this time the Oxford Symposium claimed imitators elsewhere in the world: there had been four recent conferences under the aegis of the American Institute of Wine & Food, while other series of symposia were under way in Australia, Turkey and New England (the latter hosted by the Culinary Historians of Boston).

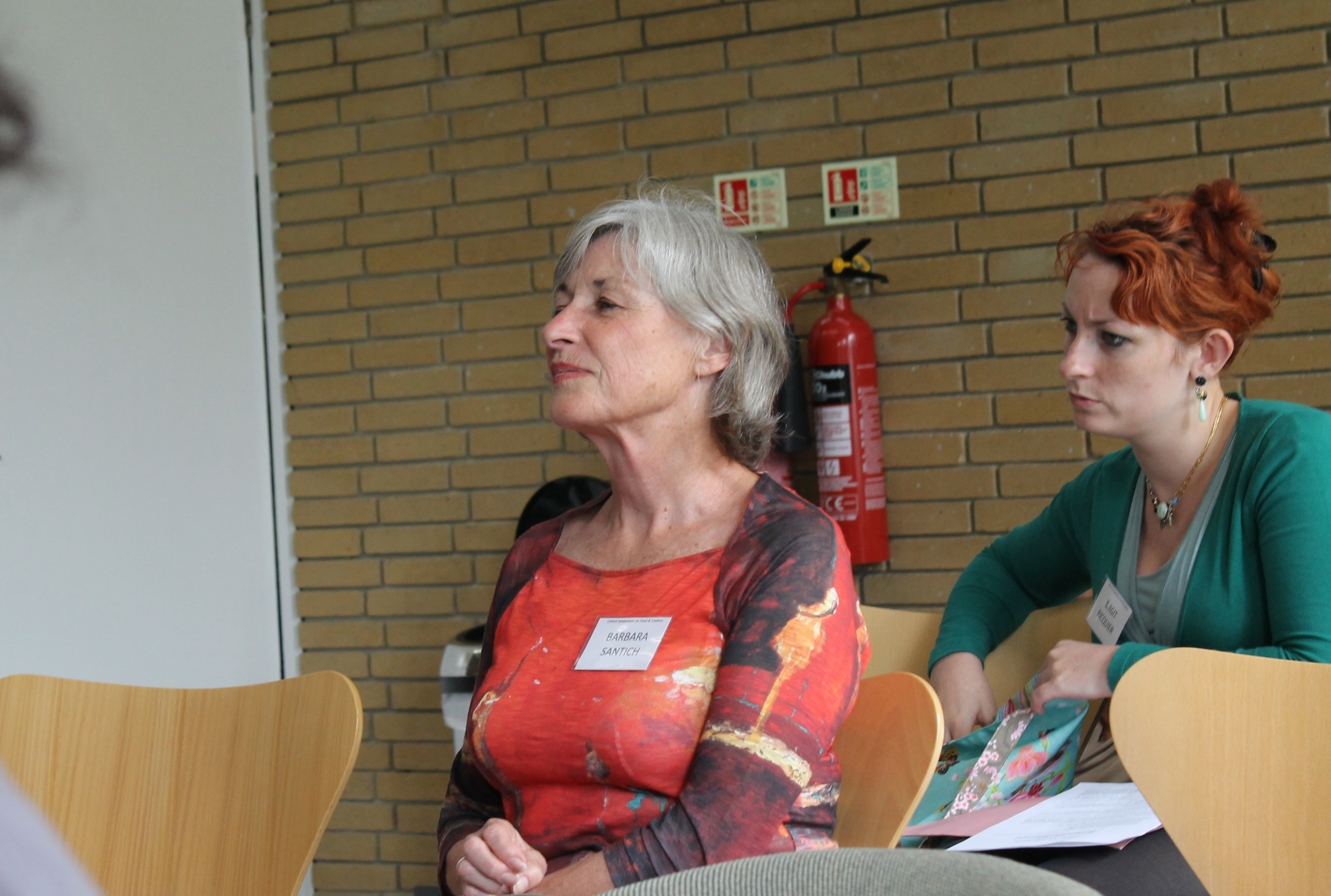
Barbara Santich at a Symposium session

Since 1986 the proceedings have been unvaryingly published in an annual volume (see "List of published symposia" below). The 1986 theme was The Cooking Medium, and three data papers were circulated in advance: two by Alan Davidson, "Edible Fats and Oils" and "Thickeners", and a multilingual survey by Jenny Macarthur, "Oils, Fats and Dairy Products: notes and lists of names". Many less-than-universal cooking media were discussed, including sheep's tail fat (by Jill Tilsley Benham), caul fat (by Jane Grigson) and almond milk (by the medieval scholar Constance B. Hieatt). Sami Zubaida of Birkbeck College spoke on "Oils and Fats in the Middle East", while Barbara Santich gave a historical outline of medieval thickeners. Among the more unusual tastes explored in the 1987 symposium on Taste was pekmez (in a paper by Nevin Halici). Esther Balogh spoke on paprika, Bruce Kraig on hot dogs and Joan Morgan on apples, soon to be the subject of her definitive The Book of Apples (1993). Historical papers were given by Anna del Conte on 18th century Naples and Charles Perry on Near Eastern rotted condiments (including Murri). The Cooking Pot as the theme for 1988 was suggested by Patience Gray. It was addressed by 25 speakers including, for the first time, Sophie D. Coe, who spoke on "The Maya Chocolate Pot and Its Descendants". Others who addressed the symposium for the first time included Michael Abdalla, a scholar of the modern Assyrians of the Near East (and an Assyrian himself), the anthropologist Jeremy MacClancy, the medievalist Terence Scully and the Greek food writer Rena Salaman. At the 1989 symposium, which took the theme of Staple Foods and was for the first time organized by Harlan Walker, plenary sessions were addressed by the archaeologist Keith Botsford, the food historian Andrew Dalby and the nutritionist Erica F. Wheeler, who asked: "Do Processed Societies Have Staple Foods?"

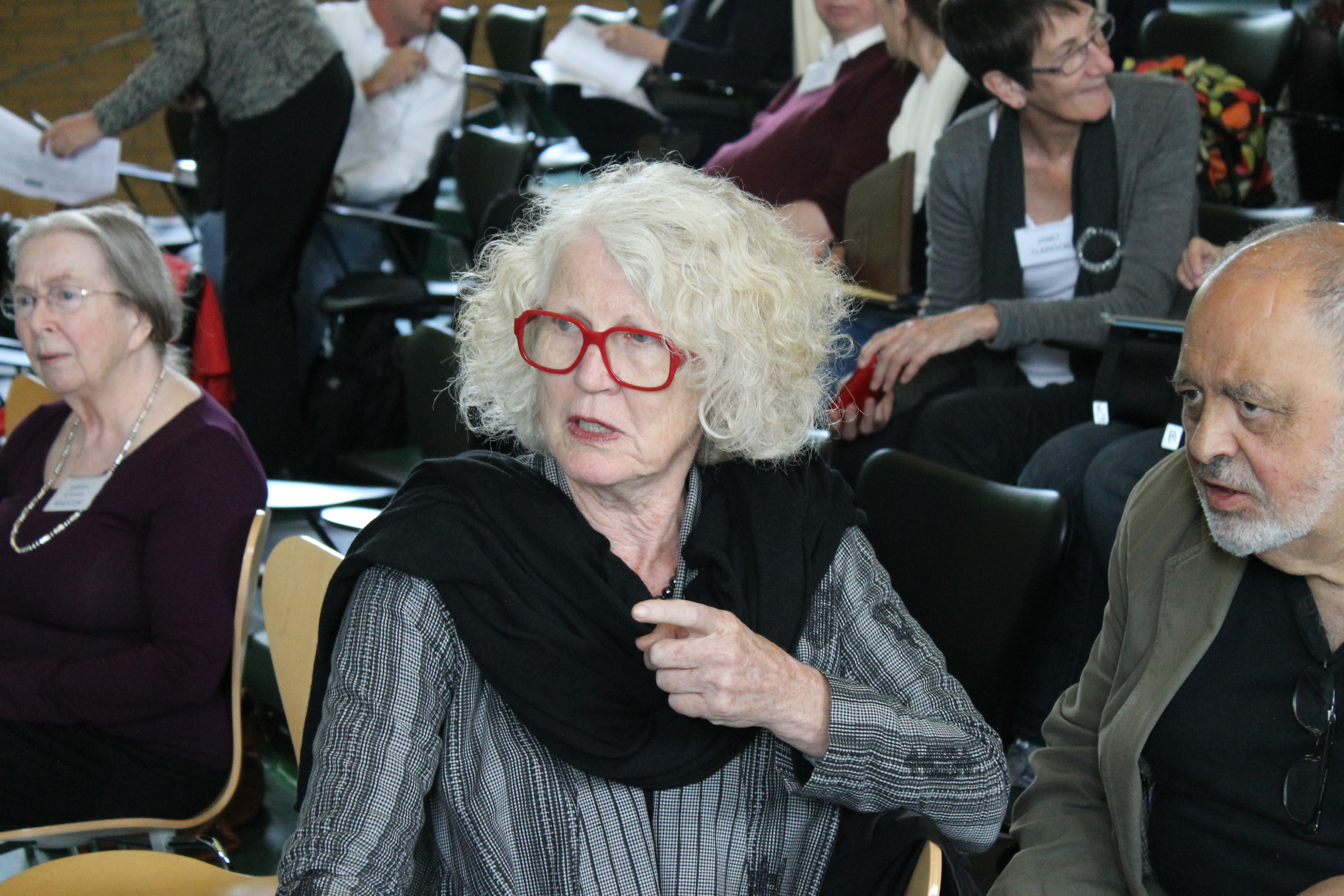
Barbara Wheaton (left), Caroline Conran and Sami Zubaida at a recent Symposium

== Symposia of the 1990s ==
From 1990 onwards conferences were held in September of each year. The theme for 1990 was Fasts and Feasts, and plenary sessions were addressed by Astri Riddervold, Bjorn Fjellheim and Marit Ekne Ruud. Historian Phyllis Pray Bober spoke on "The Black or Hell Banquet", a kind of jeu d'esprit arranged by the emperor Domitian, by Grimod de La Reynière and others through history. Robert Chenciner argued that the barbecue depicted on the Bayeux Tapestry proved that the tapestry was not an 11th-century artefact: the argument rested on "not entirely firm grounds" according to Paul Levy. At the 1991 symposium, on the theme of Public Eating, the plenary paper, "Utility and Symbol in Public Eating", was given by Sami Zubaida. Richard Hosking spoke on "Pavement Food, Packed Meals and Picnics in Japan", Doreen Fernandez on "Balut to Barbecue: Philippine Street Food", Robert A. Leonard on "Food, Drink and Swahili Public Space", Barbara Wheaton on "Expositions universelles" and Sharon Hudgins on "The Beer Taverns of Prague". The published volume of the 1992 symposium is entitled Spicing Up the Palate. Aromatics that were discussed included silphium (Alice Arndt), rosewater (Helen Saberi), chocolate (Sophie Coe and Alice Wooledge Salmon), mastic (Rena Salaman and Nevin Halici) and annatto (Elisabeth Lambert Ortiz). Margaret Visser spoke on moretum, likening it to "ancient Roman pesto", while Loret Lee discussed flavour water or lu sui, a flavouring prominent in Chinese cuisine. Look and Feel was the subject of the 1993 symposium.

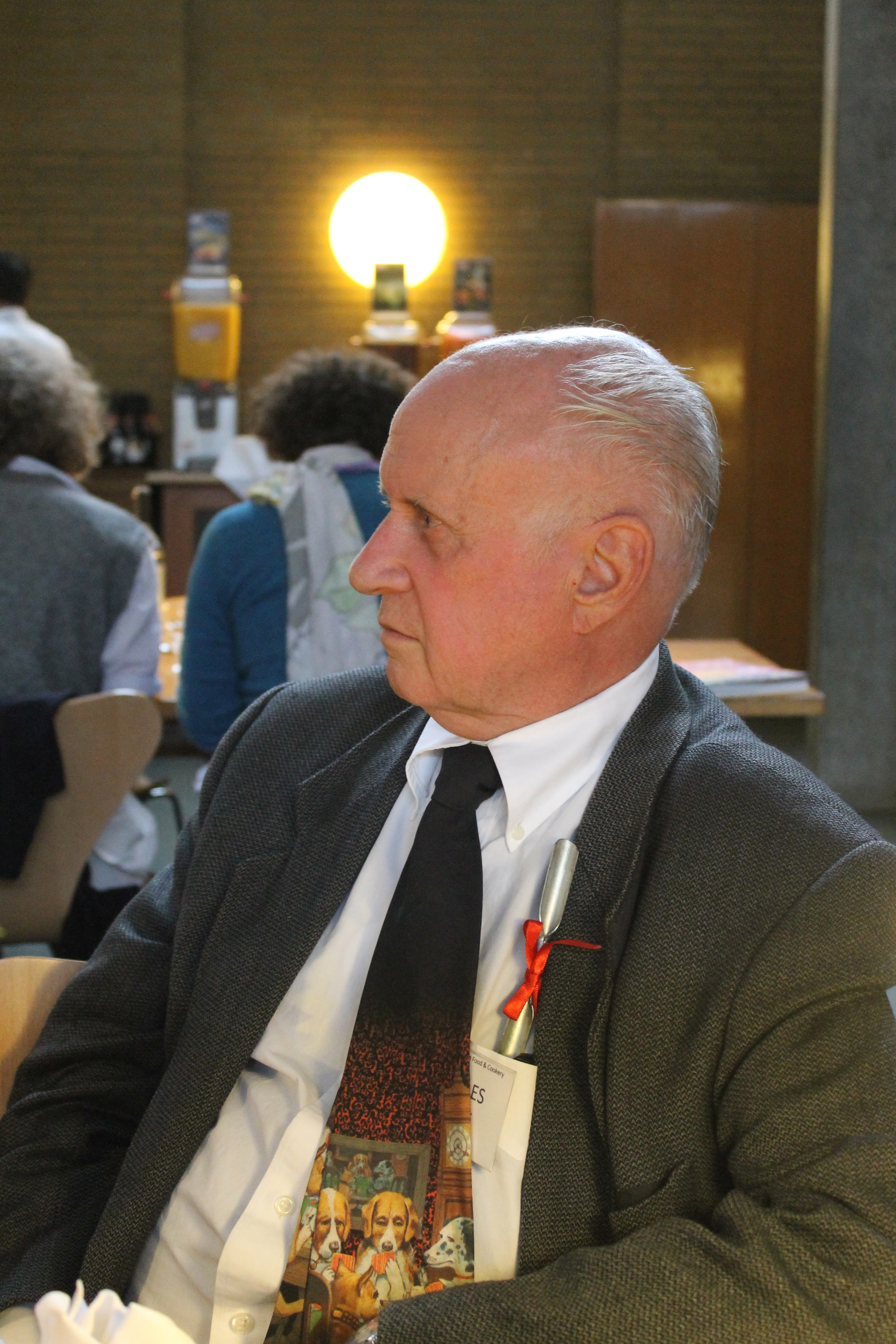
Charles Perry, food writer on the Los Angeles Times and scholar of Arabic food history

The 1994 theme was Going Today: Gone Tomorrow? Endangered Foods and Dishes. Fat-tailed sheep recurred in Charles Perry's paper; June di Schino discussed and offered samples of the monastic confectionery of southern Italy, including (from the monastery of Santa Maria dell'Itria in Sciacca, Sicily) honey cookies made in the shape of a woman with three breasts. Gastronomic events at the 1994 symposium included the most authentic Mexican meal yet seen in Britain, featuring huitlacoche and amaranth greens flown in from Mexico. This feast was organized by Bruce Kraig and prepared by Dudley Nieto. Plenary sessions were addressed by Jeremy Cherfas of the Henry Doubleday Research Association on "Vanishing Vegetable Varieties -- and How to Save Them" and by Camellia Panjabi of Taj Hotels on "The Non-Emergence of the Regional Foods of India", the Punjabification of Indian food and the universality of tandoori chicken. The Australian food journalist Cherry Ripe had proposed the theme and gave the keynote address. Titled "Dying of Starvation in the Supermarket", her talk surveyed the problem of diminishing bio-diversity in domesticated animals and plants. As participants noted, "the continued existence of many breeds ... depends on their being eaten by man"; therefore "it could be (and was) argued that vegetarianism is immoral".

The 1995 symposium, on the theme of Cooks and Other People, was the last to feature a Saturday do-it-yourself lunch to which symposiasts brought unusual foods from all over the world: organizers concluded this was "no longer possible with the present rules of hygiene". This lunch ended with two spectacular dessert, instant ice cream (Peter Barham poured liquid nitrogen into a bowl of crême anglaise) and sorbet: Robin Weir used Château d'Yquem, the premier cru supérieur Sauternes, as the basis for this costly delicacy. Gillian Riley spoke on "Platina, Martino and Their Circle"; cooks under discussion ranged from Mithaecus to Dorothy Hartley and from Nikolaos Tselementes to Martha Stewart, while "other people" who had influenced cuisine included Alexander the Great, John Calvin and Nils Gustav Dalén (Nobel laureate and inventor of the Aga). The 1996 theme was Food on the Move. The title of Philip Iddison's paper was "Arabian Travellers' Observations on Bedouin Food"; Claudia Roden's was "Food in the Sephardi diaspora". Helen M. Leach traced the history of the pavlova, Layinka Swinburne the use of ship's biscuit and portable soup, and Colin Spencer the spread of the rocambole. Chef Fritz Blank spoke on "Travelers' Diarrhea: the Science of Montezuma's Revenge".

Fish: Food from the Waters was the title of the 1997 symposium, and the papers fulfilled the promise not just of the catchword but also of the subtitle. Two American academics, both prolific food history authors, made early appearances: Ken Albala spoke on "Fish in Renaissance Dietary Theory", while Andrew F. Smith, traced the cultural links between garum and ketchup. Kathie Webber spoke on a South African delicacy, Pondoland oysters.Two food scientists contributed, Harold McGee with reference to snake mackerel, orange roughy and their slippery lipids, while Nicholas Kurti (one of the earliest symposiasts) discussed the freshwater carp, catfish (Silurus glanis) and pike that were dietary staples in the Hungary of his childhood. Food in the Arts, the 1998 topic, was also interpreted widely. There was a generous survey by Joan Alcock of food in detective novels, with due attention to the gourmand Maigret, while Barbara Haber's topic was food in American film and Andrew Coe spoke on food in Santería. Among papers relevant to painting were Robert Irwin's "The Disgusting Dinners of Salvador Dalí" and Gillian Riley's study of the still lifes of Luis Meléndez. The 1999 symposium was heralded by Nicholas Wroe in the Guardian: "51 papers on the theme of Milk: Its Uses, Products and Substitutes, embracing history, health, chemistry and sociology will be delivered to an audience of 200 historians, scientists and writers as well as domestic and commercial cooks Ove Fosså explored the true age of Norwegian gamalost cheese, and Carolin Young revisited Marie Antoinette's dairy (la Laiterie de la Reine) at Rambouillet. The title of the published symposium volume was Milk: Beyond the Dairy.

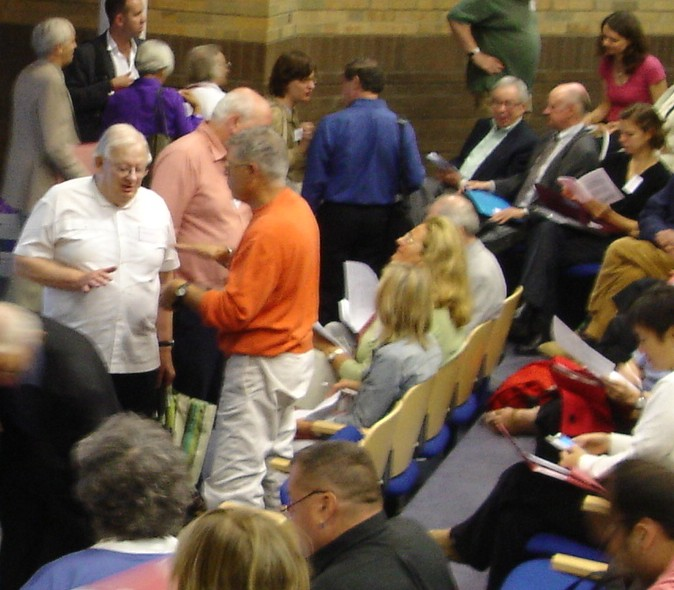
Richard Hosking (centre left, in white shirt) among symposiasts

== Symposia 2000-2005 ==
"Next year it's Food and Memory," wrote Nicholas Wroe in the article just cited. "Book early and don't forget your madeleines." Sure enough, among the speakers at the 2000 symposium, Rose Arnold took Proust as her subject and alluded to the same literary memory in her title, "Madeleines and Other Aides-Mémoire: the importance of food references in Proust's Recherche". Andrew Dalby looked at the meals in Suetonius's Lives of the Caesars and their sources in the collective memory. Geraldene Holt spoke on "Memories of M. F. K. Fisher". More uncomfortably, Andrew F. Smith spoke on "False Memories: the invention of culinary fakelore and food fallacies". Next year the symposium theme was The Meal, for which Philip Iddison drew on his own experience with "Perpetual Picnics: the meal in the UAE" and Sami Zubaida also focused on the Islamic world with "Drink in the Structure of the Meal: Middle Eastern patterns". A joint paper by Chris Grocock and Sally Grainger looked at a Roman poetic lunch, "Moretum: a peasant lunch revisited". Fat was the subject for 2002. The title of the joint paper by Gerald and Valerie Mars, anthropologist and historian respectively, was "Fat in the Victorian Kitchen: a medium for cooking, control, deviance and crime." Regina Sexton spoke on butter in the diet of monks and penitents in medieval Ireland. Diana Farr Louis and Linda Makris both chose topics related to fat and fasting in Greece. The published volume, under the title The Fat of the Land, would be the last edited by Harlan Walker.

The theme for 2003 was Nurture. This was the last symposium attended by Alan Davidson, who had founded the series of symposia in 1979. He had just been awarded the Erasmus Prize, and this was celebrated at a Sunday lunch in his honour. The published volume was edited for the first time by Richard Hosking, an academic who worked in Japan for many years, a specialist in Japanese food, and a regular symposiast. Until 2003 the symposia had continued to be hosted at St Antony's College. In 2004 they moved to Oxford Brookes University. The theme of the first symposium in this new location was Wild Food. Authenticity in the Kitchen was the subject for 2005.

The current chair of The Oxford Symposium is Elisabeth Luard. The President is Claudia Roden. The Director is Ursula Heinzelmann. The Patron is Theodore Zeldin.

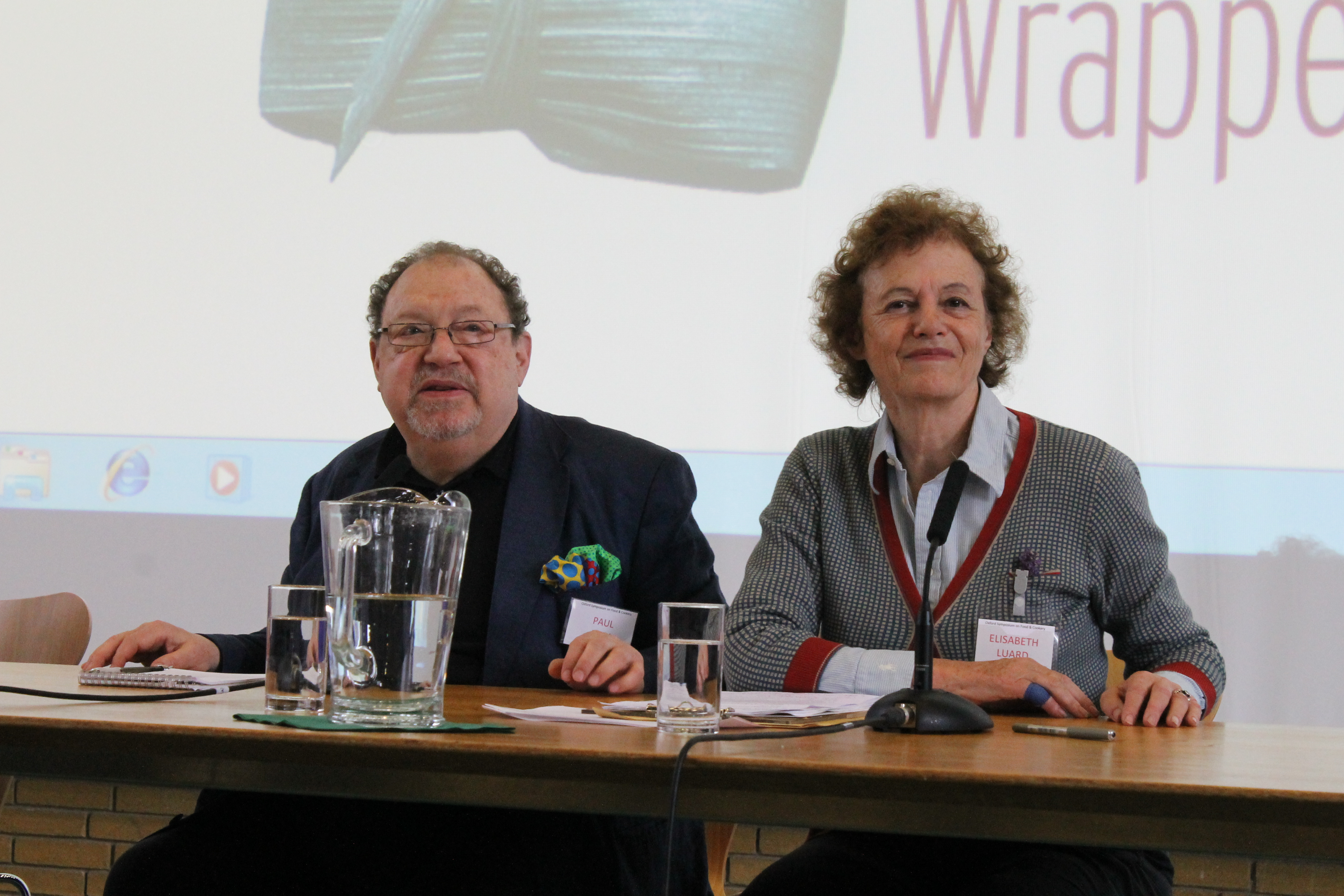
Paul Levy and Elisabeth Luard chairing a plenary session at the 2012 Symposium

== Symposia at St Catherine's College 2006-2020 ==
Since 2006 the venue for the Oxford Food Symposium has been St Catherine's College.

- 2006 : Eggs in Cookery (Richard Hosking, ed.) Prospect Books, 2007. ISBN 978-1-903018-54-5 Text on Google Books
- 2007 : Food and Morality (Susan R. Friedland, ed.) Prospect Books, 2008. ISBN 978-1-903018-59-0 Text on Google Books
- 2008 : Vegetables (Richard Hosking, ed.) Prospect Books, 2009. ISBN 978-1903018668
- 2009 : Food and Language (Helen Saberi, ed.) Prospect Books, 2010. ISBN 978-1903018798
- 2010 : Cured, Fermented and Smoked Foods (Helen Saberi, ed.) Prospect Books, 2011. ISBN 978-1903018859
- 2011 : Celebration (Mark McWilliams, ed.) Prospect Books, 2012. ISBN 978-1903018897
- 2012 : Wrapped & Stuffed Foods (Mark McWilliams, ed.) Prospect Books, 2013. ISBN 978-1-903018-99-6
- 2013 : Food & Material Culture (Mark McWilliams, ed.) Prospect Books, 2014. ISBN 978-1-909248-40-3
- 2014 : Food & Markets (Mark McWilliams, ed.) Prospect Books, 2015. ISBN 978-1-909248-44-1
- 2015: Food and Communication
- 2016: Offal: Rejected and Reclaimed Foods
- 2017: Food and Landscape
- 2018: Seeds
- 2019: Food and Power
- 2020: Herbs and Spices
- 2021: Food & Imagination
- 2022: Portable Food: Food Away from the Table
- 2023: Food Rules & Rituals
- 2024: Gardens, Flowers & Fruit
- 2025: Food & the Elements
- 2026: Poverty Food

Frequent speakers not already mentioned include the American writer Jeffrey Steingarten. Many topics have had their first airing at the Oxford Symposium, including the expression "molecular gastronomy."

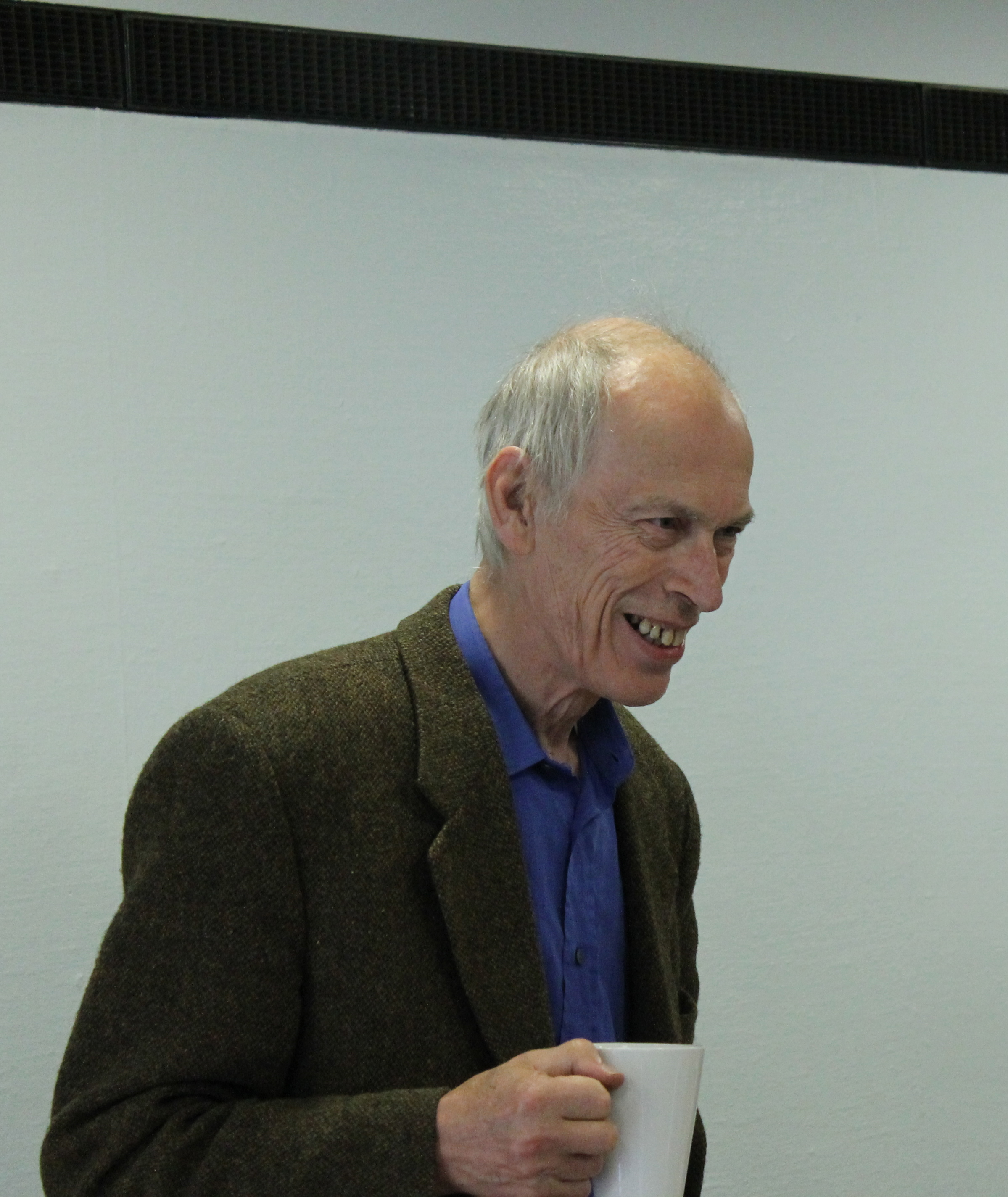
Tom Jaine, former editor of the Good Food Guide, editor of the published symposia 1983–1988, and publisher of Prospect Books 1993–2014

== List of published symposia ==
- 1981 : National & Regional Styles of Cookery (Alan Davidson, ed.) London: Prospect Books, 1981. ISBN 0907325076 Text on Google Books
- 1983 : Food in Motion: the Migration of Foodstuffs and Cookery Techniques (Alan Davidson, ed.) Prospect Books, 1983. 2 vols. ISBN 9780907325154, ISBN 9780907325161 Text on Google Books
- 1984-1985 : Cookery: Science, Lore & Books (Tom Jaine, ed.) Prospect Books, 1986. ISBN 0907325335 Text on Google Books
- 1986 : The Cooking Medium (Tom Jaine, ed.) Prospect Books, 1987. ISBN 090732536X Text on Google Books
- 1987 : Taste (Tom Jaine, ed.) Prospect Books, 1988. ISBN 0907325394 Text on Google Books
- 1988 : The Cooking Pot (Tom Jaine, ed.) Prospect Books, 1989. ISBN 0907325424 Text on Google Books
- 1989 : Staple Foods (Harlan Walker, ed.) Prospect Books, 1990. ISBN 0907325440 Text on Google Books
- 1990 : Feasting and Fasting (Harlan Walker, ed.) Prospect Books, 1991. ISBN 0907325467 Text on Google Books
- 1991 : Public Eating (Harlan Walker, ed.) Prospect Books, 1992. ISBN 0907325475 Text on Google Books
- 1992 : Spicing Up the Palate: studies of flavourings, ancient and modern (Harlan Walker, ed.) Prospect Books, 1993. ISBN 0907325505
- 1993 : Look & Feel (Harlan Walker, ed.) Prospect Books, 1994. ISBN 0907325564 Text on Google Books
- 1994 : Disappearing Foods (Harlan Walker, ed.) Prospect Books, 1995. ISBN 0907325629 Text on Google Books
- 1995 : Cooks & Other People (Harlan Walker, ed.) Totnes: Prospect Books, 1996. ISBN 0907325726 Text on Google Books
- 1996 : Food on the Move (Harlan Walker, ed.) Prospect Books, 1997. ISBN 0907325793 Text on Google Books
- 1997 : Fish: Food from the Waters (Harlan Walker, ed.) Prospect Books, 1998. ISBN 0907325890 Text on Google Books
- 1998 : Food in the Arts (Harlan Walker, ed.) Prospect Books, 1999. ISBN 1903018013 Text on Google Books
- 1999 : Milk: Beyond the Dairy (Harlan Walker, ed.) Prospect Books, 2000. ISBN 1903018064 Text on Google Books
- 2000 : Food and the Memory (Harlan Walker, ed.) Prospect Books, 2001. ISBN 1903018161 Text on Google Books
- 2001 : The Meal (Harlan Walker, ed.) Prospect Books, 2002. ISBN 1903018242 Text on Google Books
- 2002 : The Fat of the Land (Harlan Walker, ed.) Footwork, 2003. ISBN 0953505715 Text on Google Books
- 2003 : Nurture (Richard Hosking, ed.) Footwork, 2004. ISBN 978-0953505722 Text on Google Books
- 2004 : Wild Food (Richard Hosking, ed.) Prospect Books, 2006. ISBN 1903018439 Text on Google Books
- 2005 : Authenticity in the Kitchen (Richard Hosking, ed.) Prospect Books, 2006. ISBN 1903018471 Text on Google Books
- 2006 : Eggs in Cookery (Richard Hosking, ed.) Prospect Books, 2007. ISBN 978-1-903018-54-5 Text on Google Books
- 2007 : Food and Morality (Susan R. Friedland, ed.) Prospect Books, 2008. ISBN 978-1-903018-59-0 Text on Google Books
- 2008 : Vegetables (Richard Hosking, ed.) Prospect Books, 2009. ISBN 978-1903018668 Text on Google Books
- 2009 : Food and Language (Helen Saberi, ed.) Prospect Books, 2010. ISBN 978-1903018798 Text on Google Books
- 2010 : Cured, Fermented and Smoked Foods (Helen Saberi, ed.) Prospect Books, 2011. ISBN 978-1903018859 Text on Google Books
- 2011 : Celebration (Mark McWilliams, ed.) Prospect Books, 2012. ISBN 978-1903018897
- 2012 : Wrapped & Stuffed Foods (Mark McWilliams, ed.) Prospect Books, 2013. ISBN 978-1-903018-99-6
- 2013 : Food & Material Culture (Mark McWilliams, ed.) Prospect Books, 2014. ISBN 978-1-909248-40-3
- 2014 : Food & Markets (Mark McWilliams, ed.) Prospect Books, 2015. ISBN 978-1-909248-44-1
- 2015 : Food and Communication (Mark McWilliams, ed.) Prospect Books, 2016. ISBN 978-1-909-248-49-6 Text on Google Books
- 2016 : Offal: Rejected and Reclaimed Food (Mark McWilliams, ed.) Prospect Books, 2017. ISBN 978-1-909-248-55-7 Text on Google Books
- 2017 : Food and the Landscape (Mark McWilliams, ed.) Prospect Books, 2018. ISBN 978-1-909-248-62-5 Text on Google Books
- 2018 : Seeds (Mark McWilliams, ed.) Prospect Books, 2019. ISBN 978-1-909-248-65-6 Text on Google Books
- 2019 : Food and Power (Mark McWilliams, ed.) Prospect Books, 2020. ISBN 978-1-909248-70-0
- 2020 : Herbs & Spices (Mark McWilliams, ed.) Prospect Books, 2021. ISBN 978-1-909248-72-4
- 2021 : Food & Imagination (Mark McWilliams, ed.) Prospect Books, 2022. ISBN 978-1-909248-76-2
- 2022 : Portable Foods: Food away from the Table (Mark McWilliams, ed.) Prospect Books, 2023. ISBN 978-1-909248-80-9
- 2023 : Food Rules & Rituals (Mark McWilliams, ed.) Prospect Books, 2024. ISBN 978-1-80050-576-6
- 2024 : Gardens, Flowers & Fruit (Mark McWilliams, ed.) Prospect Books, 2025. ISBN 978-1-80050-688-6
- 2025 : Food and the Elements (Mark McWilliams, ed.) Equinox Publishing, 2026.ISBN 978-1-80050-921-4
