= Barbara Ketcham Wheaton =

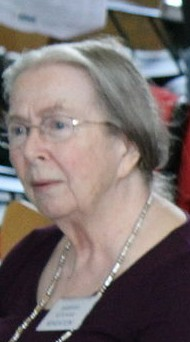
Barbara Ketcham Wheaton at the Oxford Food Symposium in 2012

Barbara Ketcham Wheaton (born in 1931 as Barbara Van Sciver Ketcham; Philadelphia) is an American writer and food historian. Since 1990, she has been honorary curator of the culinary collection at the Schlesinger Library, Radcliffe College, one of the largest collections in the United States of books and manuscripts relating to cooking and the social history of food.

== Biography ==
In 1976, Wheaton produced a modern edition of Agnes B. Marshall's Victorian classic The Book of Ices, originally published in London in 1885. She is the author of the well-reviewed Savoring the Past: The French Kitchen and Table from 1300 to 1789, and of the biography of Marie-Antoine Carême, French exponent of grande cuisine, in Alan Davidson's Oxford Companion to Food (1999). At her request (she did not want to wash dishes and wanted a durable but disposable dish) the MIT Media Lab's Counter Intelligence Group created its Dishmaker, a machine that made dishes on demand out of food-safe materials and recycled them afterwards. She developed "The Cook's Oracle", a searchable database that establishes relationships among recipes in cookbooks from different historical periods. Wheaton hopes to find someone who will continue her database, now on Microsoft Access, and make it available.

Wheaton received a bachelor's degree in art history at Mount Holyoke College in 1953 and a master's from Radcliffe College in 1954. She married Robert Wheaton in the 1950s. The couple had three children and remained married until his death in 2010.

In 1964-65 she attended the École des Trois Gourmandes founded in Paris by Julia Child, Simone Beck, and Louisette Bertholle. She was a founding Trustee, 2003–2007, of the Charitable Trust for the Oxford Symposium on Food and Cookery and has been vice-president since 2008 of the American Friends of the Oxford Symposium. She is also an Overseer at Plimoth Plantation and a Corporator of the Worcester Art Museum. On October 28, 2007, the Schlesinger Library held a day-long symposium in her honor.

== Publications ==
Books

- (introduction and annotations) Ices, Plain and Fancy: The Book of Ices by Agnes B. Marshall. New York: Metropolitan Museum of Art, 1976. Reissued under the title Victorian Ices & Ice Cream, 1984
- (with Patricia Kelly) Bibliography of Culinary History: Food Resources in Eastern Massachusetts. Boston: G. K. Hall, 1987
- Savoring the Past: The French Kitchen and Table from 1300 to 1789 Philadelphia: University of Pennsylvania Press, 1983; London: Chatto & Windus, 1983. French translation: L'office et la bouche: étude des moeurs de la table en France, 1300-1789. Paris: Calmann-Lévy, 1984

Articles

- "How to Cook a Peacock" in Harvard Magazine (1979)
- "The Cooks of Concord" in Journal of Gastronomy (1984)
- "The Serendipitous Year" in Journal of Gastronomy (1987)
- "Petits Riens and Pommes Barigoule: Food in France after the Revolution" in Journal of Gastronomy (1989/1990)
- "The Pleasures of Parisian Tables from Daumier to Picasso" in Barbara S. Shapiro, ed., The Pleasures of Paris from Daumier to Picasso (Boston: Museum of Fine Arts, 1991)
- "Carême" in Alan Davidson, ed., The Oxford Companion to Food (Oxford, 1999)
- "Culinary History" (with Ellen Messer, Barbara Haber and Joyce Toomre) in The Cambridge World History of Food (Cambridge, 2000)
- "Le menu dans le Paris du XIXe siècle" in À table au XIXe siècle (Paris: Réunion des musées nationaux; Flammarion, 2001. Catalog of an exhibition at the Musée d'Orsay, 2001–2002)

== Bibliography ==
- "Food-Historikerin Barbara Ketcham Wheaton " in Valentinas-Kochbuch.de (January 2010)
- Francesca T. Gilberti, "Stacks of Delicious" in The Harvard Crimson (1 November 2006)
- Ursula Heinzelmann, "Die beharrliche Entschlüsselung der Kochbücher" in Effilee (29 Oct. 2009)
- Verlyn Klinkenborg, "Of Cabbages and Kings: Why don’t cookbooks reflect what's really going on in the kitchen?" in Gourmet (June 2000)
- Elizabeth Gawthrop Riely, "Library Honors Food Historian Barbara Ketcham Wheaton" in The Radcliffe Quarterly (Cambridge, Mass., 2007)
