= Tom Jaine =

British food writer and editor (born 1943)

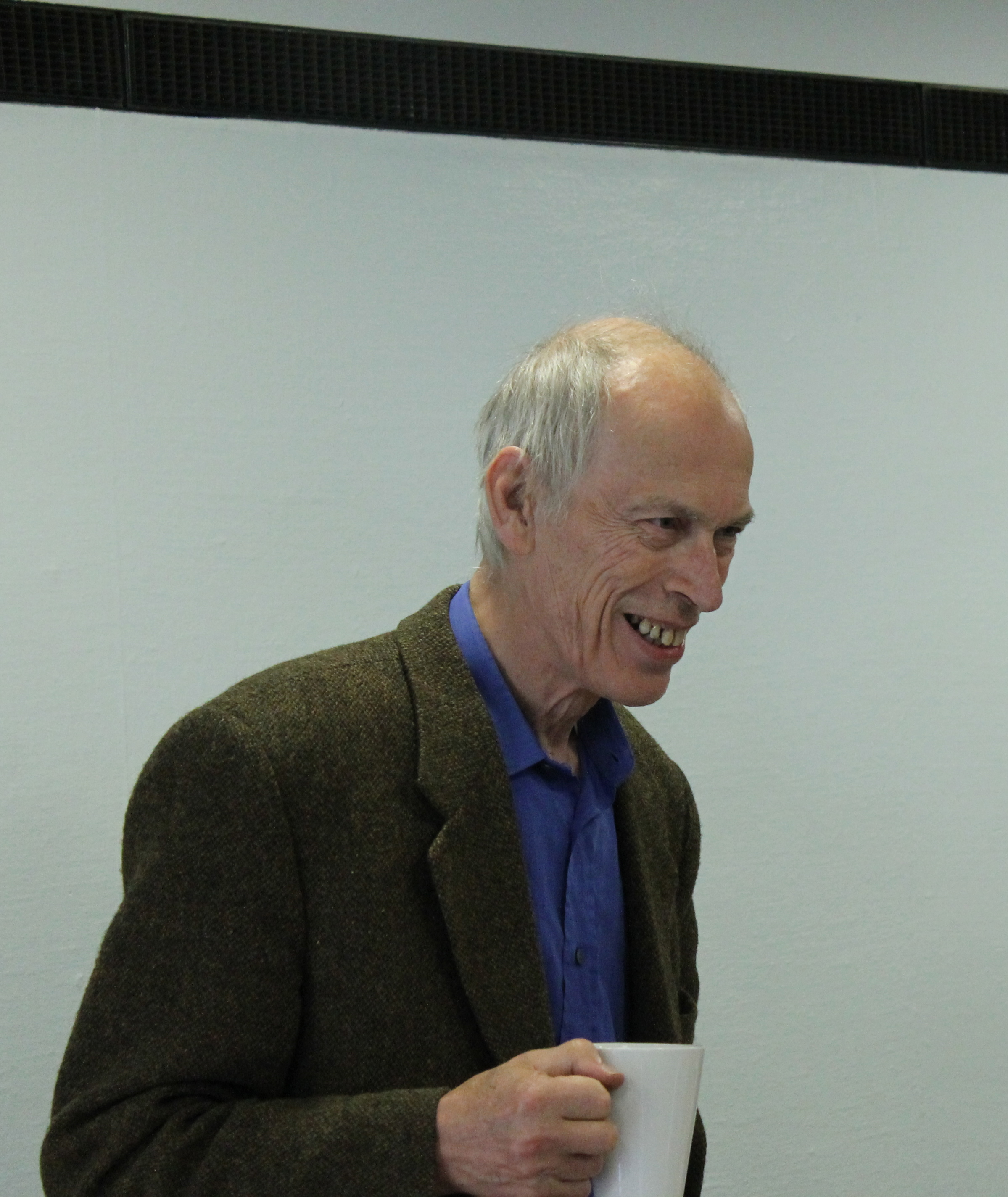
Tom Jaine at the Oxford Symposium on Food and Cookery 2012. He is the publisher of the annual volumes of Symposium proceedings

Tom Jaine (born 4 June 1943) is a former restaurateur, a food writer and former publisher of Prospect Books.

He was educated at Kingswood School (1955–1959) and at Balliol College, Oxford where he studied Modern history (1961–1964). He worked as an archivist from 1964 to 1973 and a restaurateur from 1974 to 1984. From 1984 to 1988, he organised the Oxford Symposium on Food and Cookery, and from 1989 to 1994 he waso editor of the annual Good Food Guide. From 1993 to 2016 he was the proprietor of Prospect Books, a prize-winning publishing company specialising in food and food history.

He is the author of four books and has written for The Times, The Guardian, The Sunday Times, The Sunday Telegraph, The Evening Standard and many other newspapers and magazines. He has presented The Food Programme and appeared on it many times, has done interviews for the BBC, BBC TV, and ITV, and a series of programmes about food and cookery in the Balkans for BBC Radio 4.

He was Glenfiddich Restaurant Writer of the year in 1994, Glenfiddich Food Broadcaster of the year in 2000, and that same year he was also the winner of the top award: Glenfiddich Trophy for the best Wine and Food Writer of the year.

== Bibliography ==
=== As author ===
- Cooking in the Country by Tom Jaine and James Ravilious (Prospect Books 1986) ISBN 978-0-7011-3134-0
- Cosmic Cuisine by Tom Jaine and Nich Campion (Harper Collins 1988) ISBN 978-0-06-250559-0
- Contributed to Traditional Country House Cooking edited by C. Anne Wilson (Weidenfeld & Nicolson 1993) ISBN 978-0-297-83137-2
- Building a Wood-fired Oven (Prospect Books 1996) ISBN 978-1-903018-80-4
- Making Bread at Home (Weidenfeld & Nicolson Illus. 1998) ISBN 978-0-297-84391-7

=== As editor ===
==== Books ====
- co-editor of the Oxford Companion to Food, 2nd and 3rd editions

==== Annual guides ====
- Westcountry Cooking's Guide to Good Food in the West Country, (1999-2000) ISBN 978-1-874448-27-3
- The Good Food Guide from 1989 to 1994.

==== Periodicals ====
- World Gastronomy, Journal of The International Wine and Food Society (London)
- Food and Wine, Journal of The International Wine and Food Society (London)
- Petits Propos Culinaires, since 2000.

==== Symposia ====
- Oxford Symposium on Food and Cookery, from 1986 to 1990.

=== As translator ===
- The French Country Housewife: the first volume of Maison rustique des dames (1859) by Cora Millet-Robinet, translated with introduction by Tom Jaine. London: Prospect Books, 2017. ISBN 978-1-909248-52-6
