= Carrot jam =

Fruit jam made with carrots

Carrot jam on shrimp frittata

Carrot jam is a preserve using carrot as its primary ingredient. It has been eaten in the Arab world for over a millennium, with recipes appearing in multiple medieval cookbooks. Carrot jam also has a history in Britain, where it has been eaten by sailors for purported health benefits, in imitation of apricot jam, and in response to wartime shortages. Carrot jam continues to be commonly eaten in the Middle East, and is particularly popular in Iran where it is often flavoured with orange peel and rosewater.

== History ==
Carrot jam has historically been eaten in the medieval Arab world. Kitab al-Tabikh, a 10th-century cookbook written in Baghdad by Ibn Sayyar al-Warraq contains a recipe, and two recipes appear in Kanz al-fawa'id fi tanwi' al-mawa'id, a cookbook likely compiled in the 13th century in Egypt. One of these from Kanz instructs:

It is necessary to select fresh, red carrots, to wash them, clean them, and cut them as thinly as possible. Put them in a ceramic pot, add a little bit of honey, and cover them with water. Cook them until they are soft, then strain off the water with a sieve and add a quantity of skimmed honey equal to that of the carrots. Mix in seasonings chosen from among pepper, ginger, cardamom, cinnamon, cubeb, spikenard, mace, galangal, aloe wood [Aquilaria agallocha], saffron, and musk. Cook to thicken the carrot jam [jawarish]. Pour [it] into a glass jar and consume it as needed.

Another reference to carrot jam in the Middle East appears in the 15th century, in the Ottoman Empire. In a record of a banquet held amid a circumcision festival, carrot jam features on a table of sweets and desserts, sitting alongside dishes such as puddings and quince.

Captain James Cook brought carrot marmalade on his late-18th century voyages, in the hopes that it would prevent scurvy. In this vein, the Scottish doctor Alexander Hunter included a recipe in his 1808 edition of The Family Receipt Book, presenting "a Curious preparation of Carrot Marmalade, chiefly for the Use of Seamen in long Voyages" as a treatment for scurvy and fever. A recipe for carrot jam was published in the first edition of Mrs. Beeton's Book of Household Management (1861) as an imitation of apricot jam. This was made by boiling shredded carrot with sugar, allowing the mixture to cool, then adding lemon rind and bitter almond and leaving it to set. Mrs Beeton recommended adding brandy alongside the lemon and almond, otherwise the jam "will then not keep: with the brandy it will remain good for months."

A carrot jam popular in France was attested early in the 20th century, made with the strongly flavoured Crecy carrots. During the Second World War, the British government promoted carrot jam alongside other carrot foods and dishes, wanting to encourage consumption of a crop that grew readily and abundantly. One of the uses suggested by the government for this carrot jam was as a filling for cakes.

== Modern consumption ==
Carrot jam continues to be eaten in the Middle East, among other jams made from vegetables. In Afghanistan and Iran, a version of carrot jam is flavoured with cardamom and contains slivers of almonds and pistachios. Carrot jam is particularly popular in Iran, where it is most often flavoured with orange peel and rosewater. Jams in Iran are more viscous than British jams and are used as dips, sauces, and to flavour tea. Historically, these jams contained carrots cut finely, but today it is more common for them to be minced or grated.

In the EU today, carrot jam is classified as a fruit jam. This follows the definition laid out in Council Directive 2001/113/EC of 20 December 2001, which states that "for the purposes of this Directive, tomatoes, the edible parts of rhubarb stalks, carrots, sweet potatoes, cucumbers, pumpkins, melons and water-melons are considered to be fruit". A carrot jam eaten in Eastern Europe is known as Dulceata de Morcovi, and is typically consumed alongside a glass of cold water and Turkish coffee.

== Sources ==
- Artan, Tülay (2011). "Ahmed I's Hunting Parties: Feasting in Adversity, Enhancing the Ordinary". In Singer, Amy (ed.). Starting with Food: Culinary Approaches to Ottoman History. Princeton: Markus Wiener Publishers. ISBN 978-1-55876-514-6.
- Denker, Joel S (2009). "The Carrot Purple". In Friedland, Susan R (ed.). Vegetables: Proceedings of the Oxford Symposium on Food and Cookery 2008. Totnes: Prospect Books. ISBN 978-1-903018-66-8.
- Georgescu, Irina (2024). Danube: Recipes and Stories from Eastern Europe. London: Hardie Grant.
- Heine, Peter (2004). Food Culture in the Near East, Middle East, and North Africa. Westport, Connecticut: ABC-CLIO. ISBN 0-313-06231-5.
- Hughes, Glyn (2017). The Lost Foods of England. Winster, Derbyshire: Lulu Press. ISBN 978-0-244-02963-0.
- Levene, Alysa (2016). Cake: A Slice of History. London: Headline. ISBN 978-1-4722-2684-6.
- Nasrallah, Nawal (2013) [2003]. Delights from the Garden of Eden: A Cookbook and History of the Iraqi Cuisine (2nd ed.). Oakville, CT: Equinox Pub. ISBN 978-1-84553-457-8.
- Shaida, Margaret (August 1991). "Carrot Jam in Iran". Petits Propos Culinaires. 38. doi:10.1558/ppc.31421.
- Stead, Jennifer (August 1991). "Carrot Jam". Petits Propos Culinaires. 38. doi:10.1558/ppc.31420.
- Wondrausch, Mary (May 1991). "Carrot Jam". Petits Propos Culinaires. 37: 67. doi:10.1558/ppc.34086.
- Ysewijn, Regula (2016). Pride and Pudding: The History of British Puddings, Savoury and Sweet. Sydney and London: Murdoch Books. ISBN 978-1-74336-737-7.
- Zaouali, Lilia (2007). Medieval Cuisine of the Islamic World: A Concise History with 174 Recipes. Translated by DeBevoise, M B. Berkeley, California: University of California Press. ISBN 978-0-520-24783-3.
