= Acrylate polymer =

Group of polymers prepared from acrylate monomers

Structure of a polyacrylate polymer

An acrylate polymer (also known as acrylic or polyacrylate) is any of a group of polymers prepared from acrylate monomers. These plastics are noted for their transparency, resistance to breakage, and elasticity.

Acrylate polymer is commonly used in cosmetics, such as nail polish, as an adhesive.

== History ==
The first synthesis of acrylic polymer was reported by G. W. A. Kahlbaum in 1880.

== Acrylic elastomers ==
Acrylic elastomer is a general term for a type of synthetic rubber whose primary component is acrylic acid alkylester (ethyl or butyl ester). Acrylic elastomer possesses characteristics of heat and oil resistance, with the ability to withstand temperatures of 170–180 °C. It is used primarily for producing oil seals and packaging related to automobiles.

Acrylic elastomer can generally be characterized as one of two types. "Old" types include ACM (copolymer of acrylic acid ester and 2-chloroethyl vinyl ether) containing chlorine and ANM (copolymer of acrylic acid ester and acrylonitrile) without chloride. "New" types do not contain chlorine and are less prone to mold-related staining. Other than the slightly better water resistance of ANM there are no physical differences between the two types.

The material is less resistant in terms of cold weather with a saturation point of −15 °C for old types and −28 °C to −30 °C for new types. In terms of vulcanization, the standard method for the old type is amine vulcanization. To minimize permanent deformation, the old type requires curing for 24 hours at a temperature of 150 °C. On the other hand, for the new type, the press curing time and follow-up vulcanization time are significantly reduced by combining metal soap and sulfur. It has no special characteristics. The rebound resilience and abrasion resistance of the new type are poor, and even its electrical characteristics are considerably poor compared with acrylonitrile-butadiene rubber and butyl rubber.

== Uses ==
- Polyacrylate emulsion, water-borne coating, are used as binder for outdoor and indoor "latex" house paints.
- Acrylic paints as artist paints.
- Acrylic fibre.
- Sodium polyacrylate water-soluble thickeners, a polymer for the production of the Superabsorbent polymer (SAP) used in disposable diapers due to its high absorbency per unit mass.
- Acrylic resin as pressure-sensitive adhesive.
- "Super glue" is a formulation of cyanoacrylate.
- Polymethyl methacrylate is the clear break-resistant sheeting sold as acrylic glass (or simply acrylic sheet) or under the trade name Plexiglas, Perspex, etc.
- Polyacrylates are used in cosmetic products as rheology modifiers and film formers, and these are typically polymers of acrylic acid fluids.

== Related polymers ==
- PVAc copolymer emulsion glue of vinyl acetate (VAM) and acrylic acid (VAA)
- Polyacrylamide copolymer used as flocculation agent in water treatment

== See also ==
- Dishmaker
- (Meth)acrylate
