= Sri Owen =

Indonesian cooking teacher and food writer (1935–2025)

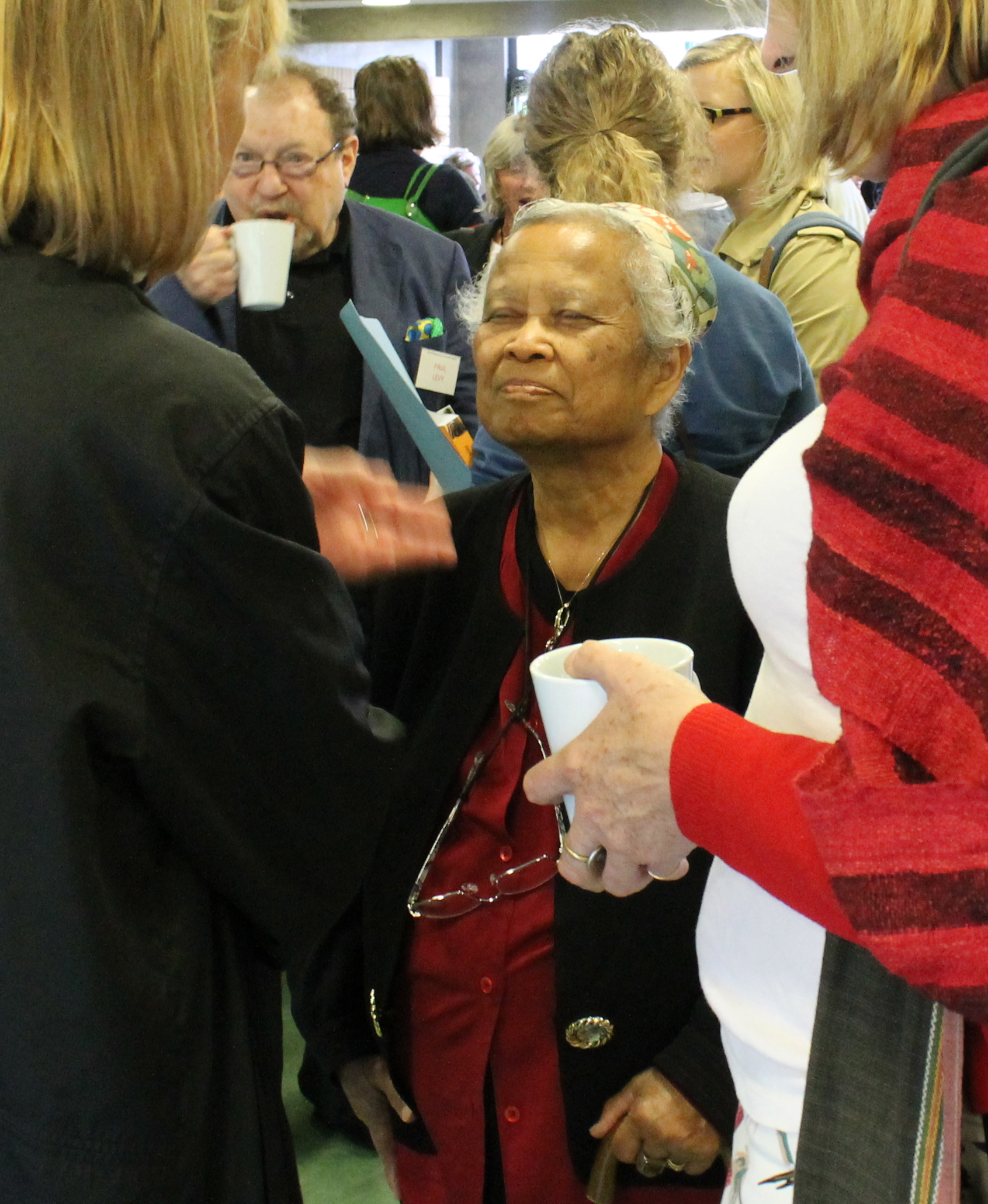
- Owen in 2012
- Born: 31 March 1935; Padang Panjang, Sumatra's West Coast Residency, Dutch East Indies
- Died: 4 October 2025 (aged 90); London, England
- Occupation(s): Cookbook writer and culinary teacher
- Spouse: Roger Owen (died 2021)
- Website: http://www.sriowen.com/

Sri Owen (31 March 1935 – 4 October 2025) was an Indonesian cooking teacher and food writer, based in London for most of her life. She was the author of the first English-language recipe book dedicated to the food of Indonesia, and is recognised as a leading authority on Indonesian cuisine.

== Early life ==
Owen was born in Padang Panjang, West Sumatra, in what was then the Dutch East Indies, on 31 March 1935. She was born to a Minangkabau family, in a town at the heart of that culture. She was the eldest of six children, all girls.

Her childhood was disrupted by Japanese occupation of the Dutch East Indies; during World War II, millions of Indonesians died of famine, forced labour, and the disruption of society. Her parents worked as teachers, and the family lived briefly in Jakarta, before settling in Magelang, Central Java in 1949. Sri continued her education in Yogyakarta and studied English Literature at Gadjah Mada University. After graduating, she taught at the university and became head of its library; it was there in 1961 that she met Roger Owen, a British Oxford University graduate, who lectured in history in Indonesia for three years. Sri and Roger married in 1962.

== Career ==
After accompanying her husband back to London in 1963, Sri worked as a translator, broadcaster and producer for the BBC Far Eastern Service for almost 20 years. In 1984, Roger and Sri moved with their two sons to Wimbledon Village, where Sri sold Indonesian dishes and snacks from a shop on the High Street.

Her first cookbook, The Home Book Of Indonesian Cookery, was published by Faber in 1976, and brought together family recipes handed down by her grandmother and carefully recorded by her mother. Owen went on to write more than a dozen books on the food of Indonesia and other Asian countries. A significant mentor was Alan Davidson, author of The Oxford Companion to Food, to whom she eventually dedicated her 15th book, Sri Owen’s Indonesian Food. He influenced her thinking about "foodways"—the ever-evolving totality "of all the food habits in a community or culture". She argues that rendang, recognised by the Indonesian state as one of the five national dishes, is a Minangkabau dish.

In addition to her writing, Owen has run cookery demonstrations, workshops and courses across the globe, and has appeared on BBC TV with chefs including Raymond Blanc.

== Death ==
Owen died in London on 4 October 2025, at the age of 90.

== Recognition ==
The Rice Book was selected by Bee Wilson of the Observer Food Monthly as one of the magazine's top 50 cookbooks of all time. Owen's most recent book, Sri Owen’s Indonesian Food, is an autobiographical celebration of the cooking of the country of her birth.

Melissa Clark of the New York Times quotes Paul Levy, chairman emeritus of the Oxford Symposium on Food and Cookery, siting Owen's food scholarship within the tradition of culinary writers who also opened up to the English-speaking world then-novel cuisines like Elizabeth David (Mediterranean cuisine), Jane Grigson (European cooking, and traditional British dishes), Claudia Roden (Middle Eastern food), and Julia Child (classical French cuisine).

Sri Owen has been described by Nikkei Asia as "the Indonesian food writer credited with introducing her country's cuisine to the world". She mentored young chef and writer Lara Lee, who also wishes "to share the wonderful cuisine of Indonesia with the world". The San Francisco Chronicle calls her "an obvious authority on Indonesian cooking" Mayukh Sen described Sri Owen simply as "The Woman Who Changed the Way We Think About Indonesian Food".

== Bibliography ==
- The Home Book Of Indonesia Cookery (1976) ISBN 978-0571108503
- Indonesian Food and Cookery (1980) ISBN 978-0907325000
- Indonesian and Thai Cookery (1988) ISBN 978-0861887804
- Exotic Feasts (1991) ISBN 978-1856260367
- Indonesian Regional Food and Cookery (1994) ISBN 978-0711212732
- The Rice Book (1993) ISBN 978-0711222601
- Healthy Thai Cooking (1997) ISBN 978-0711211315
- The Classic Asian Cookbook (1998) ISBN 978-0751304398
- Noodles: The New Way (2000) ISBN 978-0375504365
- New Wave Asian (2002) ISBN 978-1903845783
- Sri Owen's Indonesian Food (2008) ISBN 978-1910496718

== Awards ==
- Indonesian Food and Cookery received the Langhe Ceretto Prize and was shortlisted for the 1995 Julia Child award.
- The Rice Book won the Andre Simon Memorial Award in 1993.
- Sri Owen received the Lifetime Achievement Award in June 2017 from the Guild of Food Writers in London.

== See also ==
- Padang cuisine, that of the Minangkabau people
