= Marion Boyars Publishers =

British publishing company

- Founded: 1975; 51 years ago
- Founder: Marion Boyars
- Country of origin: United Kingdom
- Headquarters location: London
- Distribution: Central Books (UK); Consortium Book Sales & Distribution (US)
- Publication types: Books
- Nonfiction topics: the humanities and social sciences
- Imprints: Prospect Books
- Official website: marionboyars.co.uk

Marion Boyars Publishers is an independent publishing company located in Great Britain, publishing books that focus on the humanities and social sciences. The company was formed in 1975. When Marion Boyars died in 1999, her daughter Catheryn Kilgarriff took over and is currently the managing director of the company.

== Imprints ==
=== Prospect Books ===
Prospect Books is a publisher of books and periodicals on cooking, food history and anthropology, and sometimes horticulture, notably Petits Propos Culinaires. It was founded in 1979 by Alan Davidson and his wife Jane Davidson. Prospect Books was owned by Tom Jaine from 1993 until 2014, when it was acquired by Marion Boyars Publishers.

In January 2024, Marion Boyars Publishers Ltd was acquired by Equinox Publishing.
