= Gerald Mars =

British social anthropologist (born 1933)

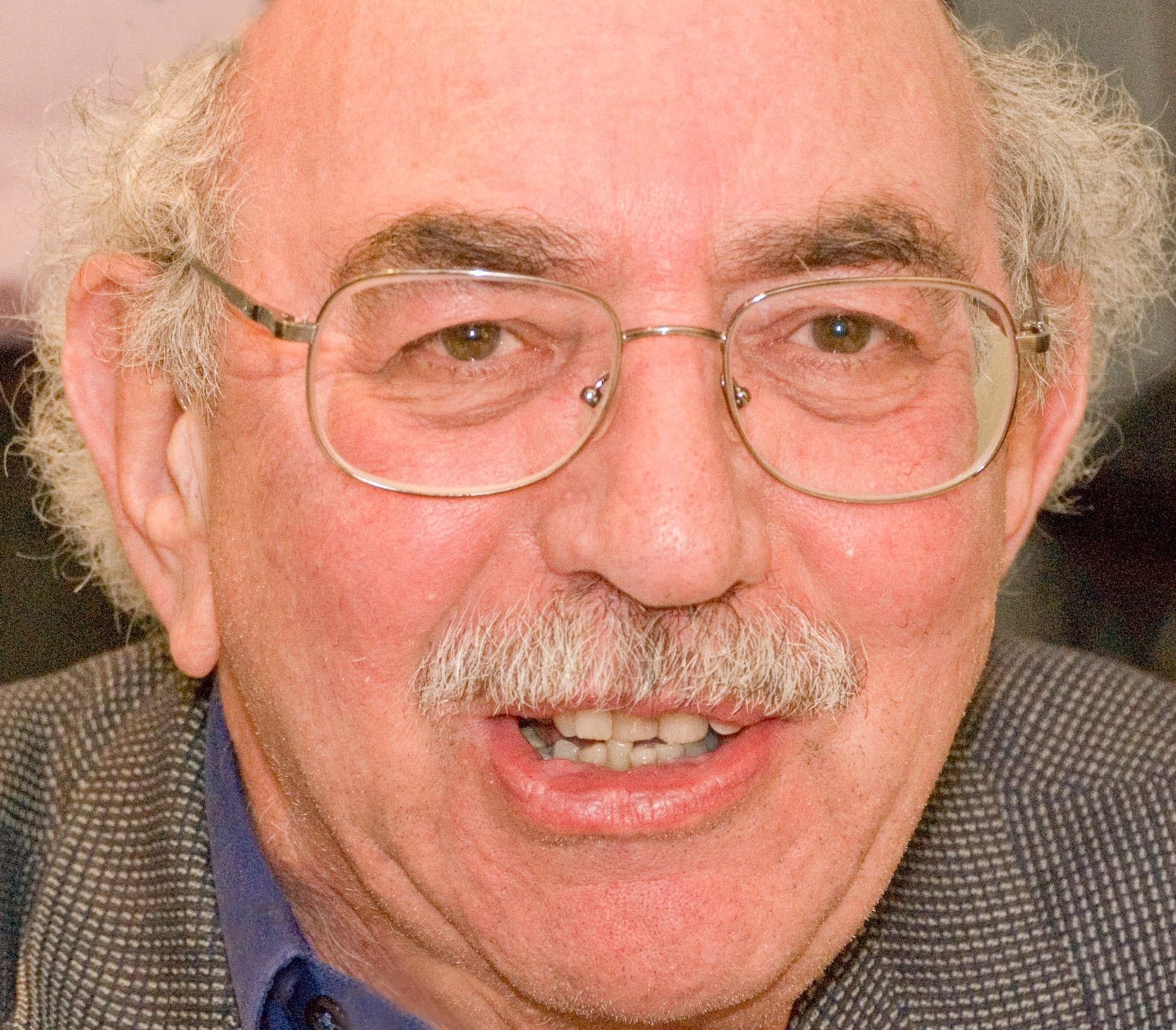
Gerald Mars

Gerald Mars (born 1933) is a British social anthropologist who works across disciplines to understand the nature and problems of modern industrial society. His work draws on the grid-group theory of Mary Douglas, on his fieldwork in Canada, Britain, Israel, and the former Soviet republics, and on his own experience. His work has often centred on workplace crime, and his best-known book, still often discussed, is Cheats at Work (1982).

Born Gerald Margolis in Manchester, the eldest of four brothers in a Jewish family, he grew up in Blackpool where, leaving school at 15, he worked at stalls on the Golden Mile and Pleasure Beach. After National Service and varied employment he was admitted in 1959 under the mature students' state scholarship scheme to Pembroke College, Cambridge, where his bemused tutor was the classicist W. A. Camps. In 1972 he gained a doctorate in anthropology at London School of Economics, supervised by Raymond Firth, having done fieldwork in 1962-1964 (hosted by the Memorial University of Newfoundland) among the dockers of St John's, Newfoundland. His title was An Anthropological Study of Longshoremen and of Industrial Relations in the Port of St John's, Newfoundland, Canada. From 1966 to 1984 he was a lecturer at Middlesex Polytechnic, then briefly at the Polytechnic of East London. In 1974 he helped to set up the first British campus of what is now ESCP Europe. Retiring from full-time teaching he became a professor at the schools of management and policy studies at Cranfield with part-time professorships at several other universities. For seventeen years he was a part-time consultant at the Tavistock Institute of Human Relations. In 2003 he was awarded the Lucy Mair Medal by the Royal Anthropological Institute. Since 2008 he has been honorary professor of anthropology at University College London, and since 2010 visiting professor of organisational ethnography at Suffolk Business School.

In Becoming an Anthropologist: A Memoir and a Guide to Anthropology he shows how his childhood experiences among Jews and Christians in Manchester, his work at fairground stalls in Blackpool and his National Service in the Royal Air Force steered him towards anthropology. His research at St John's, Newfoundland, at the difficult moment when traditional working practices among longshoremen were doomed to change, impelled him to explore the hidden and unofficial culture of those who work in highly regulated organizations. Soon afterwards he undertook an exploration of the black economy—the real economy—of the Soviet republics. He has applied the discipline of social anthropology and extended its methodologies to criminology (particularly workplace crime and sabotage), the economic and social effects of long wave economic cycles, occupational theory and the hotel and tourism industry: the latter was the focus of his jointly authored work The World of Waiters (1984) and of several later studies. Mars is thus one of relatively few scholars who have employed Mary Douglas's neo-Durkheimian Cultural Theory ("grid-group theory") in work on organizations and have gone on to apply its insights to business management. His highly innovative study Cheats at Work is frequently cited and discussed.

He has published a collective volume and a number of papers on the anthropology of food, several of them co-authored with his wife, the food historian Valerie Mars. They are both frequent participants at the Oxford Food Symposium.

== Major writings ==
- 1976 (with P. Mitchell) : Room for Reform? A case study on industrial relations in the hotel industry. Open University Press
- 1979 (with D. Bryant, P. Mitchell) : Manpower Problems in Hotels and Restaurants. Saxon House
- 1982 : Cheats at Work: an anthropology of workplace crime. Allen & Unwin
- 1983 (with Y. Altman) : "How a Soviet Economy Really Works" in M. Clarke, ed., Corruption. Frances Pinter
- 1984 (with Michael Nicod) : The World of Waiters: an anthropology of an occupation. Allen & Unwin
- 1986 (with Y. Altman) : "The Cultural Bases of Soviet Central Asia's Second Economy" in Central Asian Survey vol. 5 no. 3/4
- 1988 : "Hidden Hierarchies in Israeli Kibbutzim" in J. G. Flanagan, S. Rayner, eds, Rules, Decisions and Inequality in Egalitarian Societies (Aldershot: Avebury) pp. 98–112
- 1993 (editor, with Valerie Mars) : Food, Culture, and History: proceedings of the London Food Seminar
- 2000 (editor) : Risk Management. 2 vols. Ashgate
- 2001 (editor) : Workplace Sabotage. Ashgate
- 2001 (editor) : Occupational Crime. Ashgate
- 2003 (with Mary Douglas) : "Terrorism: a positive feedback game" in Human Relations vol. 56 pp. 763–786
- 2008 : "Food, Family and Tradition in North Italy: the rise and fall of a Michelin-starred family restaurant" in David Berris, David Sutton, eds., The Restaurants Book: ethnographies of where people eat. Berg
- 2008 (editor with Perri 6) : The Institutional Dynamics of Culture: the new Durkheimians. 2 vols. Ashgate
- 2013 : Locating Deviance: crime, change, and organizations. Ashgate
- 2015 : Becoming an Anthropologist: A Memoir and a Guide to Anthropology [autobiographical]

== Notes and references ==
- Yochanan Altman, ed., "Advances in cultural theory: in honour of Gerald Mars". Special section in Journal of Organizational Change Management vol. 28 no. 5 (2015). Contains 5 papers:
  - Y. Altman, "Editorial: Advances in cultural theory: in honour of Gerald Mars" Online free access
  - Taran Patel, "Crossing disciplinary, epistemological and conceptual boundaries in search of better cultural sense-making tools", pp. 728–748
  - Y. Altman, Claudio Morrison, "Informal economic relations and organizations", pp. 749–769
  - Perri 6, "Quiet unintended transitions? Neo-Durkheimian explanation of institutional change", pp. 770–790
  - Ikechukwu Umejesi, Michael Thompson, "Fighting elephants, suffering grass: oil exploitation in Nigeria", pp. 791–811
- Gerald Mars, Becoming an Anthropologist. Newcastle: Cambridge Scholars Publishing, 2015. ISBN 978-1-4438-7692-6
- Edward W. Sieh, "Employee Theft: an examination of Gerald Mars and an explanation based on equity theory" in Freda Adler, William S. Laufer, eds., New Directions in Criminological Theory (New Brunswick: Transaction Publishers, 1993) pp. 95–111
- L. Thornthwaite, P. McGraw, "Still 'Staying Loose in a Tightening World?' Revisiting Gerald Mars' Cheats at Work" in Alison Barnes, Lucy Taksa, eds., Rethinking Misbehaviour and Resistance in Organizations (Emerald Group Publishing, 2012) pp. 29–56
