= Arthur Boyars =

British writer and publisher

- Born: 28 May 1925
- Died: 6 August 2017 (aged 92)
- Education: Wadham College, Oxford
- Occupations: Poet, translator and publisher
- Spouse: Marion Lobbenberg

Arthur Boyars (28 May 1925 – 6 August 2017) was a British poet and musicologist, who was also a translator and critic, literary editor and publisher.

His Poems were published in 1944 by Fortune Press. Boyars started the small magazine Mandrake in 1945 with John Wain while at Wadham College, Oxford, subtitled "An Oxford Review"; it was published until 1957. Boyars was editor of Oxford Poetry in 1948. He is known also as a translator of Russian poetry. He became the second husband of Marion Lobbenberg, who formed a partnership with John Calder in the publishing house Calder & Boyars. Boyars's name is associated with the Russian poet Yevgeny Yevtushenko. In 2011, Boyars published a limited edition of his own poetry, Dictations: Selected Poems 1940–2009, which was described by the critic Alberto Manguel as "Dantesque".

== Works ==
- (ed. with Barry Hamer), Oxford Poetry 1948, Oxford: Blackwell, 1948
- (trans. with David Burg) Yuli Daniel, Prison Poems, 1971
- (trans. with Simon Franklin) Yevgeny Yevtushenko, The Face Behind the Face, 1979
- Dictations: Selected Poems 1940–2009, Lexington: The Philidor Company, 2011
