= Charles Perry (food writer) =

American food historian

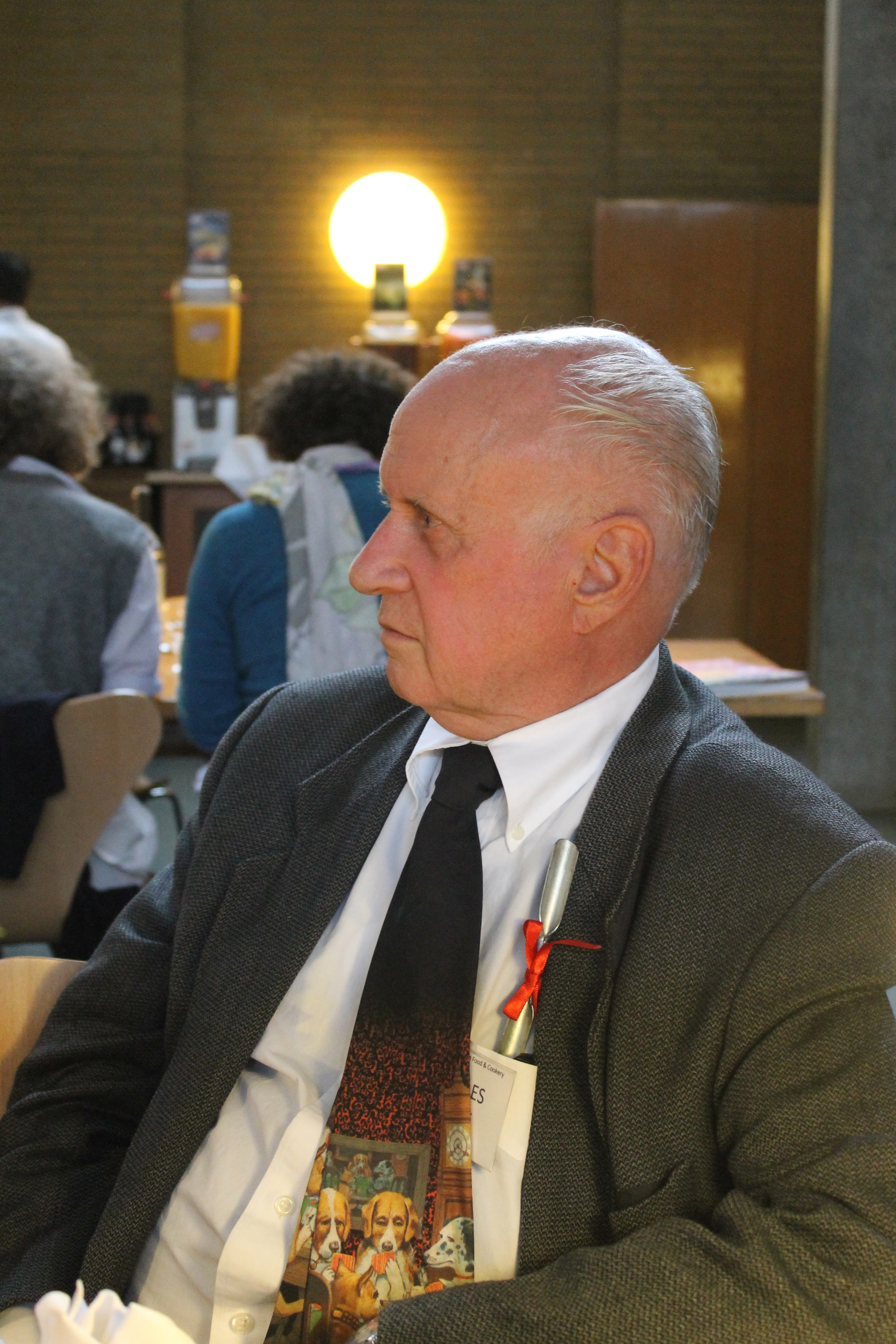
- Charles Perry at the Oxford Symposium on Food and Cookery, 2012
- Born: 1941 (age 84–85)
- Subject: History

Charles Perry (born 1941) is an American food historian. He has translated several medieval cookbooks from Arabic to English and published widely on the history of food, particularly of the Middle East and California. He also authored or co-authored books about San Francisco in the 1960s, and was a prolific journalist for Rolling Stone, the Los Angeles Times and other publications.

== Biography ==
Perry was born in Los Angeles, California in 1941 and attended public schools. From 1959 to 1961, he majored in Middle Eastern studies at Princeton University. In 1961, he transferred to the University of California, Berkeley, and in 1962 he spent a year at the Middle East Centre for Arab Studies in Shemlan, Lebanon, where he earned the British Foreign Office’s higher standard interpretership certificate. He graduated from Berkeley in 1964.

In his senior year, one of his roommates was the future “LSD millionaire” Owsley Stanley; as a result of their friendship, Perry was present for most of the great events of the San Francisco psychedelic scene of the mid-1960s. In 1968, he started working at Rolling Stone and was the first editorial employee who lasted more than a few weeks. He remained at Rolling Stone as an editor and staff writer until 1976, when he left to write The Haight-Ashbury: A History for Random House.

In 1990, he became a staff writer for the food section of the Los Angeles Times, where he remained until 2008.

== Publications ==
- A Baghdad Cookery Book Newly Translated, Prospect Books, 2005; Kitâbu’t-Tabih of Muhammad bin Hasan al-Baghdadi Turkish translation by Nazlı Piskin, published by Kitapyayınevi, Istanbul, 2009.
- “Middle Eastern Food History,” in Food in Time and Place: The American Historical Association Companion to Food History (University of California, Berkeley, 2014).
- The Haight-Ashbury: A History, Straight Arrow/Random House, 1984, reissued 2005 by WennerBooks
- Totally Hot! The Complete Hot Pepper Cookbook, Doubleday, 1985 (co-author)
- Spuds, Truffles and Wild Gnocchi: The Patina Cookbook, Collins, 1995 (co-author with Joachim Splichal)
- Medieval Arab Cookery, essays and translations by A.J. Arberry, Maxime Rodinson and Charles Perry. (Prospect Books, Totnes; 2000)
- Scents and Flavors: A Syrian Cookbook, an edition and translation of the 13th-century Kitāb al-Wuṣlah ilā l-Ḥabīb. (New York University Press, New York/Abu Dhabi, 2017)
