= Jill Norman =

British editor and food writer

Speaking at the British Library in 2017 for an event of the Oxford Food Symposium

Jill Norman is a British editor and food writer. She published authors such as Elizabeth David for Penguin Books and then started writing books about food herself. In 2001 she published the 564-page New Penguin Cookery Book.

== Early life ==
Jill Norman grew up in the Midlands region of England. Her father owned a large market garden and vegetable shops, so from an early age she ate well.

== Education ==
She studied French and Spanish at King's College in London.

== Herbs and Spices ==
She is acknowledged internationally as an authority on herbs and spices.

== Publishing Career ==
After university, she joined Penguin Books as an editor. One of her responsibilities was to expand the list of food and wine books. In the 60s and 70s, there were few cheap cookery books on the market, and so the list took off with authors who became household names like Elizabeth David, Jane Grigson, Claudia Roden and Alan Davidson.

There was no test kitchen at Penguin Books so Jill Norman used to test out any recipes in the books she was working on which she thought sounded interesting or 'rather dodgy'. Through the testing she says that her family ate food from all over the world and she became a 'reasonable' cook.

By the time she left Penguin, she was responsible not only for food and drink but also social sciences, education and more.

== Elizabeth David ==
Jill's first meeting with Elizabeth David was about a new cover for a book. They saw each other frequently for work and became friends. After Elizabeth David's death in 1992, as the literary executor of Elizabeth David's work, Jill Norman found a box with articles, recipes and notes about Christmas. Elizabeth David had intended to publish them as a book. Jill Norman put the material together as Elizabeth had intended in a book about Christmas that was published in

Jill finished editing Elizabeth David's last book, Harvest of the Cold Months, a book about the Social History of Ice and Ices, after David's death. It was made up of two anthologies and unpublished work.

== Awards ==
The Glenfiddich award 1986 for Sainsbury's Classic Cookbooks.

The André Simon award, the Glenfiddich award, and the IACP award for a reference book in 1990 for The Complete Book of Spices.

In 1994 André Simon Award for Elisabeth David's Harvest of the Cold Months: The Social History of Ice and Ices, which Jill Norman had edited.

In 2014 The Guild of Food Writers gave Jill Norman its Lifetime Achievement Award.

Winner 2006 James Beard Foundation Award for The Cook's Book (DK Publishing)
