= Sami Zubaida =

Iraq academic (1937–2025)

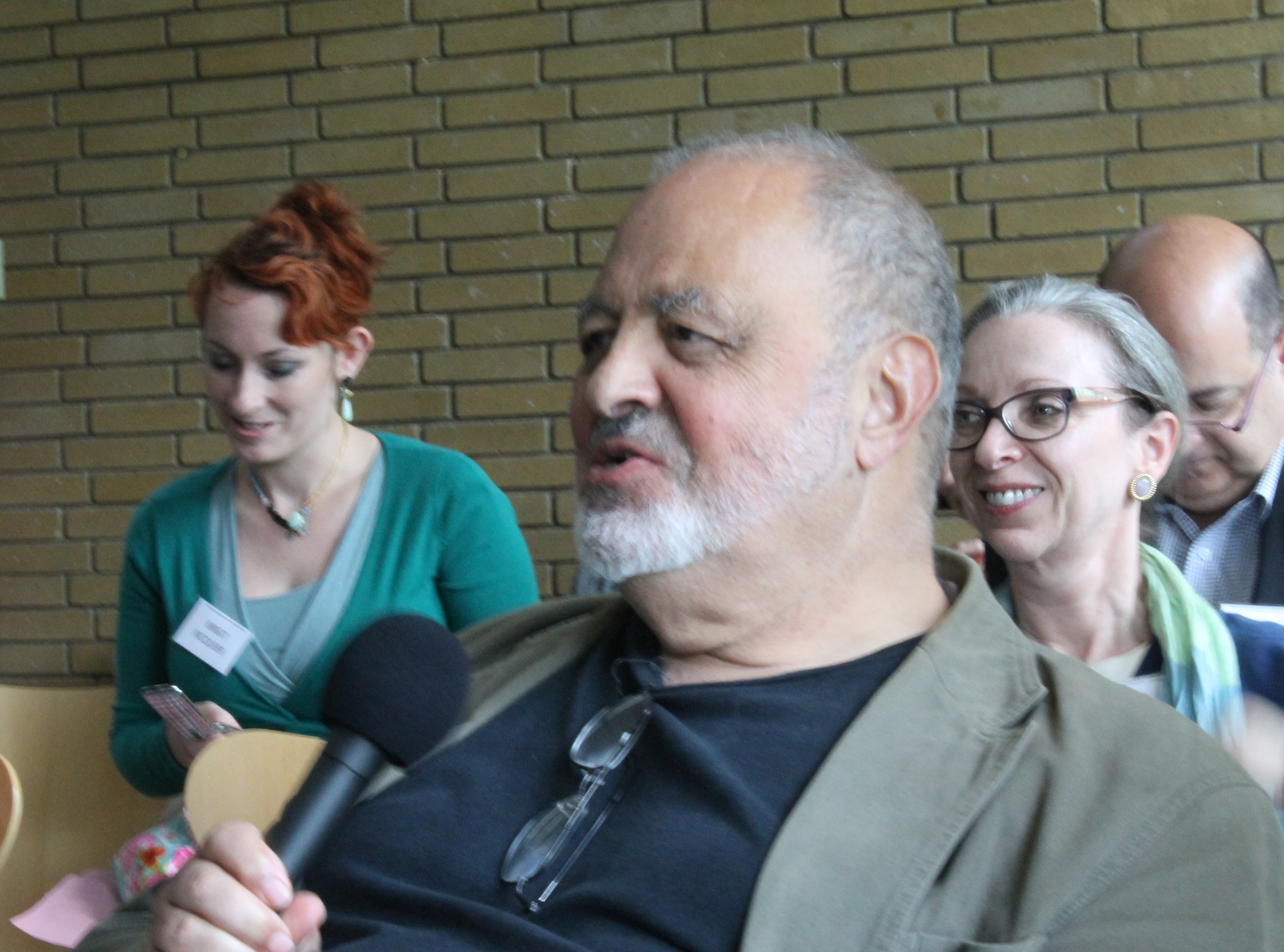
- Zubaida in 2012
- Born: 1 January 1937; Iraq
- Died: 6 April 2025 (aged 88); London, England
- Occupation: Professor
- Known for: Food studies, Political sociology, Religion, culture and politics, Sociology of Islam

Sami Zubaida (1 January 1 1937 – 6 April 2025) was an Iraqi scholar of Middle Eastern political sociology, law and culinary culture. He was born in Baghdad into an Iraqi Jewish family and in 1953, aged 16, he moved to the United Kingdom. He was an Emeritus Professor of Politics and Sociology at Birkbeck, University of London and, as a Visiting Hauser Global Professor of Law in Spring 2006, taught Law and Politics in the Islamic World at New York University School of Law. He was a regular participant at the Oxford Symposium on Food and Cookery and organized a conference at the London School of Oriental and African Studies, in 1992, which focused on the culinary cultures of the Middle East. The conference papers were published in book form in 1994.

Zubaida died in London on 6 April 2025, aged 88.

== Writings ==
- 1994 (editor, with Richard Tapper) : Culinary Cultures of the Middle East. London: I. B. Tauris. ISBN 1-85043-742-4

== Bibliography ==
- Robert Irwin, "In the Caliph's Kitchen" in Times Literary Supplement (23 December 1994) p. 10 [review of Culinary Cultures of the Middle East]
