= Elisabeth Luard =

British food writer and illustrator

- Elisabeth Luard at the Oxford Symposium on Food and Cookery in 2018
- Born: Elisabeth Baron Longmore; 1941 (age 84–85); Marylebone
- Education: Eastbourne School of Domestic Economy; City and Guilds of London Art School; Byam Shaw School of Art; Sorbonne
- Spouse: Nicholas Luard (m. 1963)
- Children: 4
- Parent(s): Richard Longmore, Millicent Baron
- Website: elisabethluard.com/home

Elisabeth Luard (born 1941) née Longmore is a food writer, artist and broadcaster. She is Chair Emerita of the Oxford Symposium on Food and Cookery.

She was born in 1941, shortly before her father Richard Longmore was killed in action as wing commander of CXX squadron while engaging U-539. Her mother, Millicent Baron, remarried a diplomat who took her to his postings in Uruguay, Spain and Mexico. She worked at the satirical magazine Private Eye where she met and married the proprietor, Nicholas Luard, in 1963. They had four children.

== Publications ==
- European Peasant Cookery: The Rich Tradition (1986)
- The Princess and the Pheasant and other recipes (1987)
- The Barricaded Larder: Food from the Storecupboards of Europe (1988)
- European Festival Food (1990)
- The Flavours of Andalucia (1991)
- Family Life: Birth, Death and the Whole Damn Thing (1996)
- Still Life (1998)
- The Food of Spain and Portugal: A Regional Celebration (2004)
- Classic French Cooking: Recipes for Mastering the French Kitchen (2004)
- My Life as a Wife: Love, Liquor and What to Do About Other Women (2008)
- Recipes & Ramblings (2010)
- A Cook's Year in a Welsh Farmhouse (2011)
- Seasonal European Dishes (2013)
- Squirrel Pie (and other stories): Adventures in Food Across the Globe (2016)
