= Cora Millet-Robinet =

French agricultural innovator and silk producer

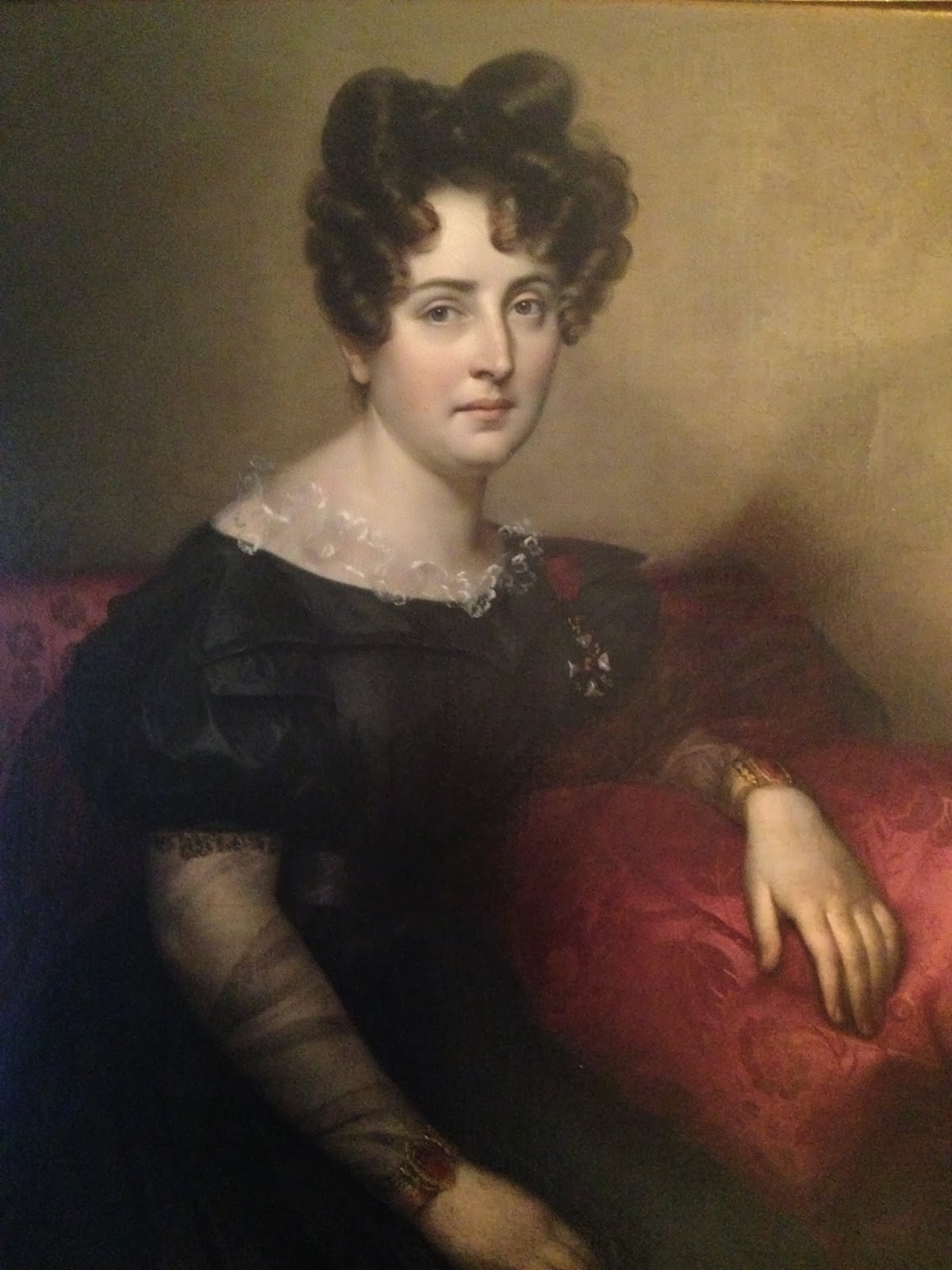
- Cora Millet-Robinet around 1830. Portrait by her sister's husband, the genre painter and phrenologist Hippolyte Bruyères
- Born: November 28, 1798; Paris, France
- Died: December 7, 1890 (aged 92); France
- Occupations: Agricultural innovator, silk producer, writer
- Known for: *Maison rustique des dames* (*The French Country Housewife*)
- Spouse: François Millet (m. 1823)
- Awards: Knight of the Order of Agricultural Merit (1884)

Cora Millet-Robinet (28 November 1798 – 7 December 1890) was a French agricultural innovator and silk producer. She was the author of a highly popular handbook of farming, household management and cookery, known in English as The French Country Housewife.

== Biography ==
Her father and mother, both French in origin, had farmed in the French Caribbean colony of Saint-Domingue, which had become the independent state of Haiti. Dispossessed as a result of the Haitian revolution, they moved to Paris where Cora Robinet, their first daughter, was born. Nothing is known of her childhood or education. In 1823 she married her mother's brother, lieutenant-colonel François Millet who, likewise born in Saint-Domingue, had recently been widowed and had come to live with his sister's family in Paris. He also owned a château and farm in Poitou, La Cataudière in the commune of Availles-en-Châtellerault (département of Vienne). After their marriage he and Cora took up farming there, eagerly experimenting with the latest scientific methods. In 1832 they were joined by Stéphane Robinet, Cora's elder brother, a well known chemist. All three took a special interest in silkworm farming and the production of silk, an industry which was then rapidly expanding in France.

Of these three, Cora was the one who wrote, both for a scientific readership and for the general public. Her first book, in 1841, offered "Advice to young women on their life and their motherly duties when nursing children". In the same year she published the first of a series of "reports on the farming of silkworms ... by Messrs Millet and Robinet and Mme Millet" (her husband, her brother and herself). Her popular books focus on children, on women's education, and on the work typically done by 19th century farmers' wives: the kitchen and household, the management of servants, the farmyard or basse-cour with its poultry, the keeping of pigeons and rabbits. The most famous of all her books, Maison rustique des dames or The French Country Housewife, first published in two volumes in 1844/1845, is an encyclopedia of cookery, the country household, and many aspects of farming. Regularly updated, this work remained in print for a hundred years: the 21st edition appeared in 1944.

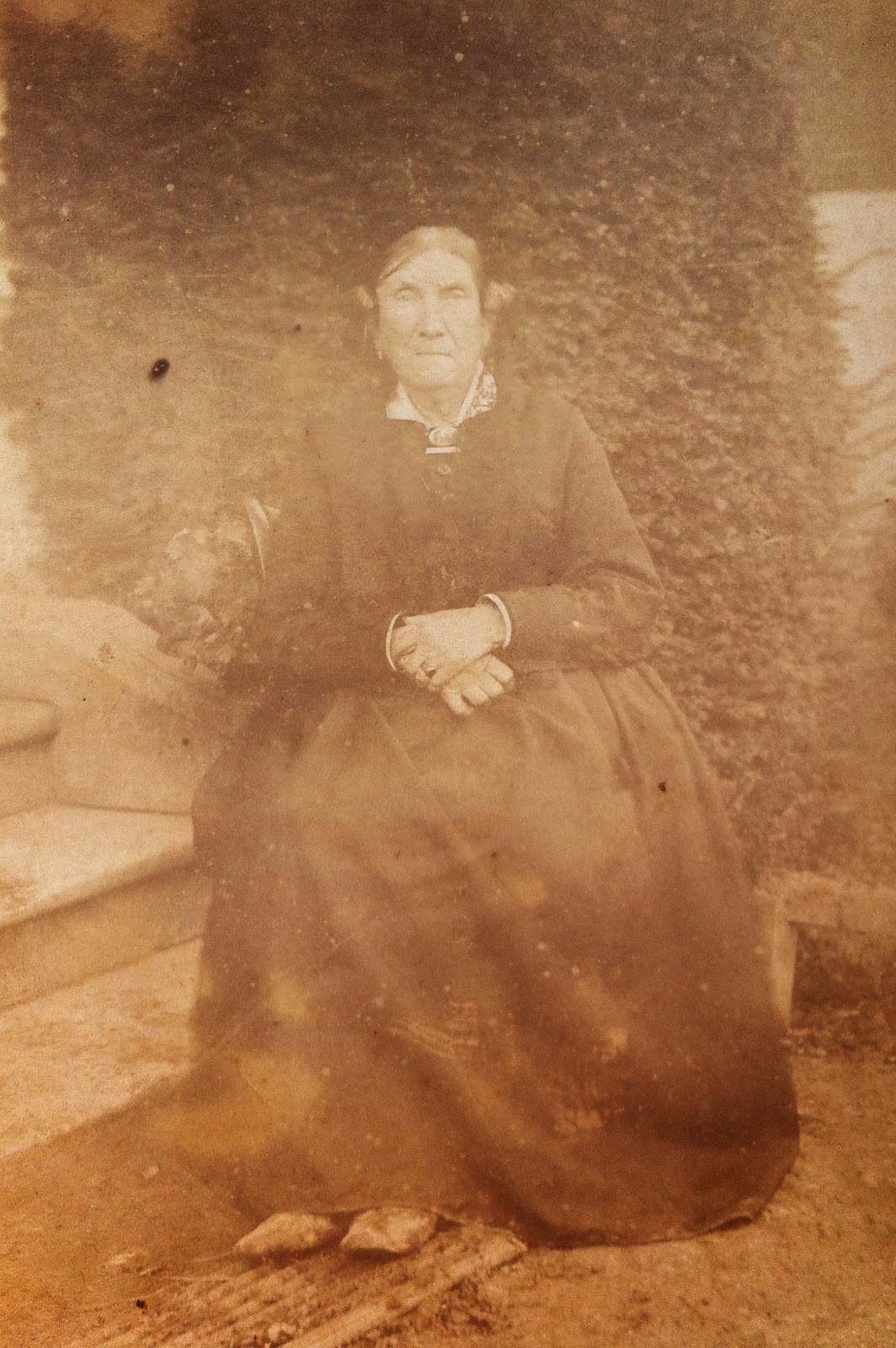
Cora Millet-Robinet on the steps of La Berlonnière at Saint-Benoît: photograph from the 1880s

In 1847/1849, François and Cora sold La Cataudière and bought the partly ruined Domaine de Pont near Genillé, which they restored and extended. François died in 1860. At some date after that Cora went to live at a smaller property, La Berlonnière, at Saint-Benoît, probably easier for her to manage alone and close to Poitiers where she had contacts with publishers and was an honorary member of the Poitiers Society for Agriculture, Sciences and Arts. She was also a corresponding member of two French agricultural societies and of the Royal Academy of Agriculture in Turin. In 1884, at the age of eighty-five, she was one of the first two women to be honoured with the title Knight of the Order of Agricultural Merit.

== Notes and references ==
- Mary R. S. Creese, Ladies in the Laboratory II: West European Women in Science, 1800-1900 (Lanham: Scarecrow Press, 2004) pp. 72–73 Selected pages at Google Books
- Tom Jaine, transl., The French Country Housewife: the first volume of Maison rustique des dames (1859) by Cora Millet-Robinet. London: Prospect Books, 2017. ISBN 978-1-909248-52-6
- Pierre Michel, "La Maison rustique des dames, ou l'édification domestique" in Stéphane Michaud, ed., L'Edification: morales et cultures au XIXe siècle (Paris: Creaphis Editions, 1993. ISBN 2-907150-32-4) pp. 105–115 Selected pages at Google Books
