= Richard Hosking =

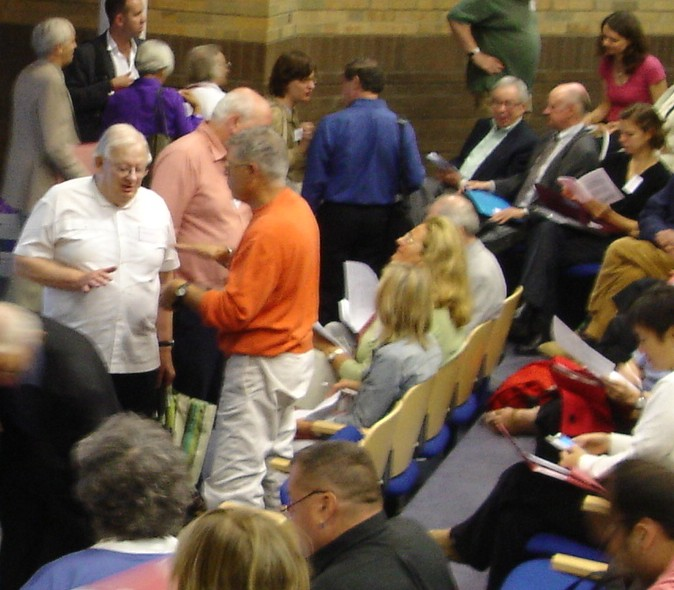
Richard Hosking (centre left in white shirt) and participants at the Oxford Symposium on Food and Cookery, 2005. He was to edit the symposium proceedings under the title Authenticity in the Kitchen

Richard Hosking (31 March 1933 – 19 October 2019) was an Australian-born graduate of the University of Cambridge, who worked at the British Museum and later was emeritus Professor of Sociology and English at Hiroshima Shudo University. He lived in London from the time of his retirement in 1998, and was a distinguished writer on Japanese food. His best known works were A Dictionary of Japanese Food: ingredients and culture (1996) and At the Japanese table (2000). He was a regular participant at the Oxford Symposium on Food and Cookery and edited five annual volumes of its proceedings. He died in London on 19 October 2019, at the age of 86.

== Works ==
- 1996 : A Dictionary of Japanese Food: ingredients and culture. Totnes: Prospect Books
- 2000 : At the Japanese Table. New York: Oxford University Press

as editor

- 2004 : Nurture: proceedings of the Oxford Symposium on Food and Cookery, 2003. Footwork. ISBN 978-0953505722
- 2006 : Wild Food: proceedings of the Oxford Symposium on Food and Cookery, 2004. Prospect Books. ISBN 1903018439 Text on Google Books
- 2006 : Authenticity in the Kitchen: proceedings of the Oxford Symposium on Food and Cookery, 2005. Prospect Books. ISBN 1903018471 Text on Google Books
- 2007 : Eggs in Cookery: proceedings of the Oxford Symposium on Food and Cookery, 2006. Prospect Books. ISBN 978-1-903018-54-5 Text on Google Books
- 2010 : Food and language: proceedings of the Oxford Symposium on Food and Cookery, 2009. Prospect Books. ISBN 978-1903018798 Text on Google Books
