= Ursula Heinzelmann =

German freelance food and wine writer

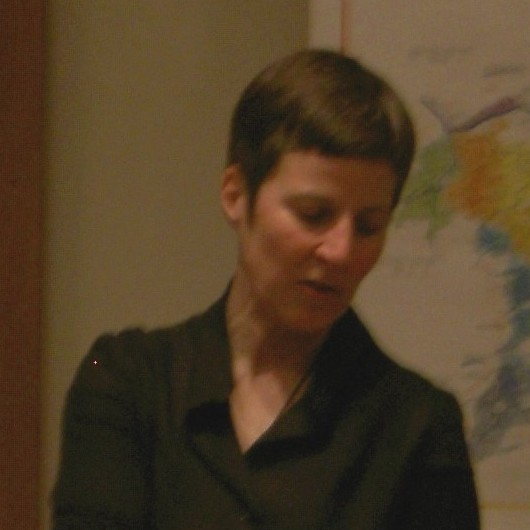
- Heinzelmann in 2012
- Born: 1963 (age 62–63); Berlin, Germany
- Occupations: Food and wine writer, sommelière and a gastronome

Ursula Heinzelmann (born in Berlin in 1963) is a freelance German food and wine writer, a sommelière and a gastronome.

== Career ==
She was a good cook before she had learned to read, according to a radio interview on HR2-Kultur, and she was a practitioner before she began to write about food: from 1986 to 1991 she ran a small hotel and restaurant on the shores of Lake Constance, and soon afterwards a delicatessen in Berlin specializing in fine French cheeses and wines. She has twice been awarded the annual Sophie Coe Prize in Food History at the Oxford Symposium on Food and Cookery, most recently in 2006. In 2008 she won the Prix du Champagne Lanson for her wine journalism on Slow Food Magazin.

In English she has written a book-length survey of German food, Food Culture in Germany, published by Greenwood Press in 2008. In Germany, however, she is best known for her series of three books on real and traditional food, beginning with Erlebnis Essen (2006). This includes a comparative tasting of top quality French and German butter in which the renowned appellation d'origine protégée butter of Isigny-Sainte-Mère met strong competition. The series continues with Erlebnis Kochen (subtitled "Manifesto for a cuisine without recipes": 2007). The third volume, Erlebnis Käse und Wein (2009), takes the form of a "voyage of discovery", an exploration of German cheese, German wine and how well the two go together. She took up the same theme in illustrated articles for the popular magazine Für Sie, "Cheese and Wine from Germany" and "Cheese and Wine Ideas".

As a journalist she has written in English for Saveur and in German for Slow Food Magazin and Frankfurter Allgemeine Sonntagszeitung. Her recipes from the Frankfurter Allgemeine were collected in book form in 2010. To Effilee she contributes a series on cheese, "Gegessener Käse", ranging from Israel and Hungary to Corsica, Britain and the United States. Her portrait of the American food historian Barbara Ketcham Wheaton, published in the same journal, has been described as "a pearl of journalism".

Ursula Heinzelmann returned to live in her native Berlin in 1993. Her 2007 article "A Night in Berlin" evokes the Christmas atmosphere of the no longer divided city as a group of friends explore its "bustling markets, venerable delicatessens, and cosmopolitan neighborhoods".

In 2014 Reaktion Books published her well-received "Beyond Bratwurst", a chronological history of food in Germany, followed by a German edition two years later, under the title "Was is(s)t Deutschland" (Tre Torri, 2016).

== Publications ==
=== Books ===
- Erlebnis Essen: Vom Duft der Erdbeere und der Würze des Teltower Rübchens. Scherz-Verlag, 2006. ISBN 9783502150138
- Erlebnis Kochen: Manifest für eine Küche ohne Rezepte. Scherz-Verlag, 2007. ISBN 9783502150879
- Food Culture in Germany. Westport, CT: Greenwood Press, 2008. ISBN 9780313344954 Preview at Google Books
- Erlebnis Käse und Wein: Eine Entdeckungsreise durch neue deutsche Genusslandschaften. Scherz-Verlag, 2009. ISBN 9783502151395
- Kulinarische Erlebnisse: Meine Rezepte aus der Frankfurter Allgemeinen Sonntagszeitung. Thorbecke Jan Verlag, 2010. ISBN 9783799508674
- Beyond Bratwurst: A History of Food in Germany. London: Reaktion, 2014. ISBN 9781780232720
- Was is(s)t Deutschland: Eine Kulturgeschichte über deutsches Essen. Wiesbaden: Tre Torri, 2016. ISBN 9783944628783

=== Articles ===
- "A Night in Berlin" in Saveur no. 107 (December 2007)
- "Die beharrliche Entschlüsselung der Kochbücher " in Effilee (29 Oct. 2009)
- "Gegessener Käse", series in Effilee (2009-2012)
