= Marion Boyars =

British publisher (1927–1999)

- Born: Marion Asmus; 26 October 1927; New York City, US
- Died: 1 February 1999 (aged 71); London, UK
- Education: Keele University
- Occupation: Publisher
- Known for: Founder of Marion Boyars Publishers
- Spouse(s): George Lobbenberg (divorced); Arthur Boyars
- Children: Two daughters

Marion Ursula Boyars, née Asmus (26 October 1927 – 1 February 1999), was a British book publisher who in 1975 founded her own imprint, Marion Boyars Publishers.

== Biography ==
She was born Marion Asmus in New York, daughter of German publisher Johannes Asmus. She attended school in New York and Switzerland, living with her mother and sister, before going on to Keele University to read for a degree in politics, philosophy and economics. After graduating, she married George Lobbenberg and had two daughters. The marriage ended in divorce, and in the 1960s she married poet and translator Arthur Boyars.

In 1960, she answered an advertisement in The Bookseller that led her to buy a 50 per cent stake in the small independent publishing company run by John Calder in London. The resultant publishing house, Calder and Boyars, published books by authors including Samuel Beckett, Marguerite Duras, Henry Miller, Eugene Ionesco, Peter Weiss and William S. Burroughs, until the firm split in 1975.

She then formed Marion Boyars Publishers, and working with her husband Arthur (described as her "literary guide and cheerleader") built up an eclectic list of translated fiction (including by such authors as Julio Cortázar, Latife Tekin, Vasily Shukshin and Witold Gombrowicz), as well as books on music and cinema.

She died of pancreatic cancer at her home in London in 1999, aged 71. On her death, her younger daughter Catheryn Kilgarriff took over the running of Marion Boyars Publishers.
