= Nicholas Wroe (disambiguation) =

Nicholas Wroe may refer to:

- Nicky Wroe (born 1985), English footballer
- Nicholas Wroe (journalist), see Oxford Symposium on Food and Cookery
