= Perri 6 =

British sociologist

- Born: David Ashworth

Academic work
- Institutions: Demos
- Main interests: Social science

Perri 6 is a British social scientist. He changed his name from David Ashworth to Perri 6 in 1983. Whilst not an academic at the time, many years later he said he was amused by the notion of "6, P" appearing in academic papers.

6 worked for Demos, a centre-left think tank with close ties to New Labour in the 1990s. Much of 6's recent research is based on the cultural theory of risk, which he refers to as "neo-Durkheimian institutional theory". He has conducted government-backed research for the Information Commissioner's Office, and has written on behalf of the think-tank Demos. He has also contributed to the peer-reviewed Journal of Public Administration Research and Theory, Social Policy and Society and Public Administration.

6 is currently chair in Public Management at Queen Mary University of London.

== Honours and awards ==
- In 2013, he was elected as a fellow of the Academy of Social Sciences.

== Selected bibliography ==
- 6, Perri; Margetts, Helen; Hood, Christopher (2010). Paradoxes of modernization: unintended consequences of public policy reform. Oxford New York: Oxford University Press. ISBN 9780199573547.
- 6, Perri; Fletcher‐Morgan, Charlotte; Leyland, Kate. "Making people more responsible: the Blair Government's Programme for changing Citizens' behaviour." Political Studies 58.3 (2010): 427–449. abstract
