= Food history =

Food history is an interdisciplinary field that examines the history and the cultural, economic, environmental, and sociological impacts of food and human nutrition. It includes famines and malnutrition. It is distinct from the more traditional field of culinary history, which focuses on the origin and recreation of specific recipes.

== Anthropologists and historians ==
Since the 19th century, anthropologists have pioneered the study of the role of food in traditional societies through direct observation and by reconstructing behavior from artifacts recovered from historical sites. The topic remains a central part of current anthropology and archaeology research as typified by K.C. Chang at Harvard University. The systematic study of food culture by professional historians is a more recent development, inspired in large part by the French Annales school typified by Fernand Braudel. However, there have always been numerous popular historical accounts, as typified by Waverley Root. The first journal in the field, Petits Propos Culinaires, was launched in 1979 and the first conference on the subject was the 1981 Oxford Food Symposium.

== Politics of food ==
Historians and political scientists have explored many national and international political aspects of food history. For example, they have looked at food's role as a colonial tool in Africa and Asia; "McDonaldization"; the food dimensions of Mexican, Chinese and Italian diasporas; class dimension in terms of the meals served in upper, middle, and working class cafés; the Green Revolution that averted starvation in the Third World; and intense debates over genetically modified food, and efforts to stop their importation.

== See also ==
- Food studies
- History of food
