= Elisabeth Lambert Ortiz =

British food writer

Elizabeth Lambert Ortiz
- Born: Elizabeth Lambert; 15 June 1915; Harrow on the Hill, Middlesex, United Kingdom
- Died: 27 October 2003 (aged 88)
- Occupation: Food writer
- Spouses: César Ortiz Tinoco
- Writing career
- Notable awards: 2x James Beard Foundation Awards

Elisabeth Lambert Ortiz (17 June 1915 – 27 October 2003) was a British food writer who popularized Latin American cuisine in the United States and the United Kingdom. Initially a writer of poetry and fiction, she began working in the culinary field upon moving to Mexico City with her second husband, and continued to work on the cuisines of the areas to which he was posted as a diplomat. She was nominated for three James Beard Foundation Awards, winning twice.

== Early life ==
Elizabeth Lambert was born 17 June 1915, in Harrow on the Hill, Middlesex, United Kingdom, she was the middle child of three sisters. Her father was a marine engineer, and because of his job, the family moved to Jamaica when Lambert Ortiz was 8 and then later on to Australia. Her writing career began there, first as a poet following the publication of three books on poetry. She also worked a court reporter in Sydney, before writing reviews of films and television. Lambert married, but her first husband died during the Second World War after volunteering for the Royal Air Force.

Lambert Ortiz moved to London in 1949, where she had intended to work as a journalist, but instead wrote a drama for the BBC before writing the novels The Sleeping House Party and Father Couldn't Juggle. She moved in the mid-1950s to New York City to work with the United Nations on a children's reference book on marine studies. It was there that she met and married diplomat Cesar Ortiz Tinoco.

== Culinary career ==
She moved with her husband when he was posted to Mexico City, where she learnt to speak Spanish and about Mexican cuisine from her Ortiz Tinoco's extended family there. She became interested in the evolution of Mexican cuisine, and the effects of colonisation had upon the native recipes. From her time in New York, she had already been in contact with the editor of House & Garden, José Wilson. She commissioned Ortiz to write articles on Mexican food, and introduced her to James Beard.

Lambert Ortiz travelled with her husband across Latin America and Asia during the 1960s, with her first cookbook, The Complete Book Of Mexican Cooking, published in 1967. She followed this up with The Book Of Latin American Cooking and The Complete Book Of Caribbean Cooking over he following few years. She wrote extensively for Gourmet magazine and several Time-Life publications. She also wrote a Complete Book of Japanese Cooking in 1976 with Mitsuko Endo while Ortiz Tinoco was posted to Bangkok. After her husband retired in 1980, they settled in Ealing, West London and her cookbooks began to be published in the UK as well as a book on nouvelle cuisine entitled A Taste Of Excellence in 1986.

=== Awards ===
She twice won James Beard Foundation Awards for her cookbooks, in 1968 for The Complete Book of Mexican Cooking and in 1980 for The Book of Latin American Cooking. Lambert Ortiz was nominated on a further occasion in 1993 for The Encyclopedias of Herbs, Spices and Flavorings. That work instead won awards from Julia Child and the International Association of Culinary Professionals.

== Later life and legacy ==
Following her husband's death in 1992, she began to become isolated due to increasing poor health due to arthritis. She subsequently returned to New York permanently to be closer to her sister. Although she wrote cookbooks on several different cuisines, she is best remembered for her work in Latin America, popularising Mexican cuisine in particular in both the United States and the United Kingdom.

== Bibliography ==
- The Complete Book of Mexican Cooking, New York: M. Evans, 1967
  - The New Complete Book of Mexican Cooking; rev. ed. London: Grub Street, 1997
- The Book of Latin American Cooking, New York: Knopf, 1979
- The Complete Book of Caribbean Cooking, M. Evans & Co., 1973
  - Caribbean Cookery. London: André Deutsch, 1975 (a revised ed. of the above)
  - Caribbean Cookery. Harmondsworth: Penguin. 1977. ISBN 9780140469271.
- Cooking with the Young Chefs of France, 1981
- From the Tables of Britain, 1986
- The Encyclopaedia of Herbs, Spices and Flavourings, 1992
