= Dishmaker =

The Dishmaker is a machine which thermoforms cups, bowls, and plates from acrylic (polymethyl methacrylate) plastic discs and then thermoforms them back into discs when they are done being used. It was about the size of a home dishwasher, and could store hundreds of discs for potential dishes.

It was designed by Leonardo Bonanni for the Counter Intelligence Group, which was active from January 1999 to January 2007 as part of the MIT Media Lab. The Media Lab is an antidisciplinary laboratory, and the Counter Intelligence Group was focused on "developing a digitally connected, self-aware kitchen with knowledge and memory of its activities".

Returning the dishes to disc form was aided by the shape-memory property of acrylic.
