= Petits Propos Culinaires =

Food history journal

Petits Propos Culinaires (PPC) is a journal covering the history of food and cookery.

== History and content ==
Founded by Jane and Alan Davidson in 1979 and first published in 1980, Petits Propos Culinaires is currently edited by Sam Bilton and published by Equinox Publishing Ltd. The frequency of publication, three times a year, has not varied but it is now available digitally as well as in print. Davidson was editor of The Oxford Companion to Food, which frequently cites PPC.

The journal has its origins in the writings of the food author Richard Olney. In 1979 he was engaged in compiling a huge multi-part cookery book which the publisher insisted must not include any recipes that had not already been published. As Olney had some original, unpublished recipes that he was determined to include, he agreed with Davidson and the latter's wife, Jane – also a food writer – to contribute recipes pseudonymously to a new journal that they would launch. They secured the help of Britain's leading food writer, Elizabeth David, and began publication. Among the contributors in the early years were David, Claudia Roden, Jane Grigson, Elisabeth Lambert Ortiz, Harold McGee and Olney, under his own name and also as "Nathan D'Aulnay" and "Tante Ursule". In 2002 Ten Speed Press published a selection of articles from the first two decades of PPC, under the title The Wilder Shores of Gastronomy: Twenty Years of the Best Food Writing from the Journal "Petits Propos Culinaires". Charles Perry of the Los Angeles Times wrote:

For two decades, Petits Propos Culinaires has offered a home to any sort of food writing that's out of the ordinary and passionately researched; an air of gentle, amusable monomania hangs about this tiny magazine. Its only shortcoming is that it has been so very petite – you don't find it on the average newsstand. Here is a chance for those who have never subscribed to sample what has been going on between its covers.

A memoir of Davidson was printed in the 100th issue of PPC in 2014. In The Daily Telegraph, Bee Wilson commented "It's a miracle that PPC has survived all these years, given the parlous state of independent publishing. ... PPC endures, despite having a weird title and devoting its pages to some pretty out-of-the-way food history." Wilson continues, "PPC stands for Petits Propos Culinaires, which translates as 'little culinary matters'. The French title was one of Alan's many jokes." She adds that despite the French title the magazine is deeply British, "with articles on such questions as the origin of stilton, the history of Chelsea buns or how 'elevenses' started".

The journal was cited in 2015 when it printed an article which said that Cornish pasties were invented in London. Further controversy was sparked in 2016, when an article rebutted the supposedly French origins of the Canadian dish cipaille, tracing them instead to barges on the Yorkshire canals in 18th-century England.

== Sources ==
- Davidson, Alan (1999). Oxford Companion to Food; illustrations by Soun Vannithone. London: Oxford University Press ISBN 0-19-211579-0. 2nd ed. Edited by Tom Jaine; consultant editor: Jane Davidson; research director: Helen Saberi 2006 ISBN 0-19-280681-5.
- Davidson, Alan & Saberi, Helen, eds. (2002). The Wilder Shores of Gastronomy: Twenty Years of the Best Food Writing from the Journal "Petits Propos Culinaires". Ten Speed Press. ISBN 1-58008-417-6.
