= Alan Davidson (food writer) =

British diplomat and food scholar

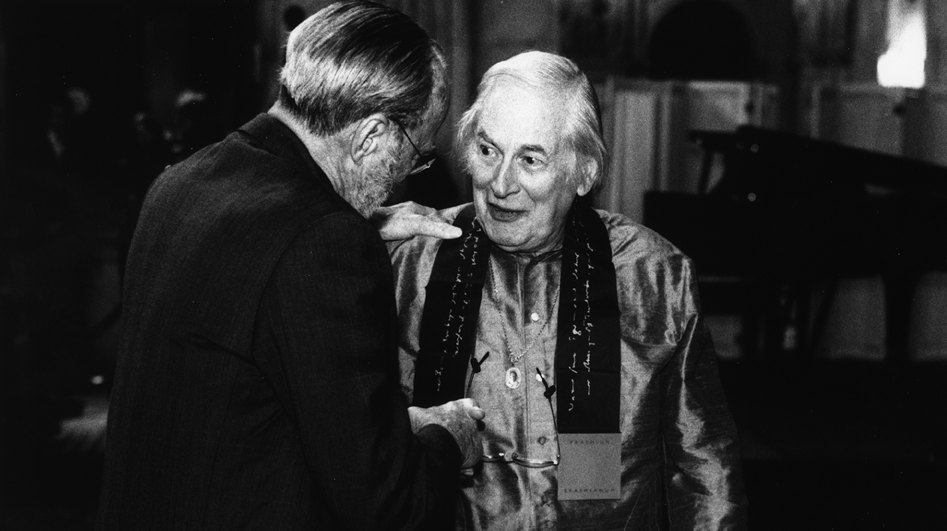
Alan Davidson (Erasmus Prize 2003)

Alan Eaton Davidson CMG (30 March 1924 – 2 December 2003) was a British diplomat and writer best known for his writing and editing on food and gastronomy.

After leaving Queen's College, Oxford, in 1948, Davidson joined the British Diplomatic Service, rising through the ranks to conclude his career as ambassador to Laos, from 1973 to 1975. He retired early and devoted himself to full-time writing about food, encouraged by Elizabeth David and others. He published more than a dozen books between his retirement and 2002, but his magnum opus was The Oxford Companion to Food, a work of more than a million words, which took twenty years to complete and was published to international acclaim in 1999.

== Life and career ==
=== Early years ===
Davidson was born in Derry, Northern Ireland, the son of William John Davidson (1899–1959), inspector of taxes, and his wife, Constance, née Eaton (1889–1974). He was brought up in Leeds in the north-east of England, where he attended Leeds Grammar School. His higher education was interrupted by the Second World War, during which he joined the Royal Naval Volunteer Reserve as an ordinary seaman and saw wartime and post-war service in the Mediterranean, Atlantic and Pacific, ending the war as a commissioned officer. In 1946 he returned to England to complete his interrupted education at Queen's College, Oxford, where he took a double first in classical moderations and Greats in 1948.

=== Foreign Office ===
From Oxford, Davidson joined the Foreign Office and between 1948 and 1973 he served in diplomatic posts in Washington, The Hague, Cairo and Tunis, headed two Foreign Office departments in London, and served as head of chancery in the British delegation to NATO in Brussels. In 1951 he married Jane Macatee. There were three daughters of the marriage.

Davidson concluded his Foreign Office career as British ambassador to Laos, 1973–1975. A colleague later said of this posting:

Laos, in those dangerous years, was far more than a small, landlocked country on the edge of a vicious war: it was the "listening post" for both sides in the Cold War, and even a bridge between them. … Alan was at the heart of this, digging delicately beneath the surface, known and respected by all".

Davidson took early retirement from the diplomatic service at the age of 51 in 1975.

=== Food writer ===
While the Davidsons were living in Tunis, Jane asked her husband to look for a cookery book on fish because she did not recognise any of the local varieties and was unsure how they should be cooked. Not being able to find one he wrote one himself: Seafish of Tunisia and the Central Mediterranean "a handbook giving the names of 144 species in 5 languages, with a list of molluscs, crustaceans, and other marine creatures, and notes on cooking". It was a 126-page tract produced on a stencil duplicator and published in 1963. The British cooking guru Elizabeth David gave it a good review in The Spectator and introduced Davidson to Jill Norman, her editor at Penguin Books; in 1972 Penguin published his Mediterranean Seafood, described by his biographer Paul Levy as "a revolutionary combination of scientific taxonomy along with the vernacular names of the fish, visual illustrations of them, and recipes for cooking them". Within four years the book had become "a classic", according to The Times: "a masterly combination of reference book and cook book with a beautifully illustrated and annotated catalogue of fish, plus a collection of remarkable recipes". Further books on the same lines followed, much of the information in them supplied by Davidson's diplomatic contacts: Fish and Fish Dishes of Laos (1975), Seafood of South-East Asia (1976), and North Atlantic Seafood (1979), all of which went through several editions.

In 1978 Davidson contracted with Oxford University Press to write what Levy calls his "magnum opus", The Oxford Companion to Food: "the house became a research centre, with the two basement rooms stacked floor-to-ceiling with cookery books and reference works in all of the several languages he, Jane, or their daughters could read". The same year the Davidsons edited and translated a 320-page selection from Le grand dictionnaire de cuisine by Alexandre Dumas, published as Dumas on Food.

In 1979 Davidson and his wife set up a publishing company, Prospect Books, to reprint rare cookery books. They also started a magazine, Petits Propos Culinaires "the first serious periodical dealing with food history" (Levy). In the same year Davidson was Alistair Horne Research Fellow at St Antony's College, Oxford. He convened a symposium on food history, in partnership with Theodore Zeldin, which grew into an annual event known since 1981 as the Oxford Symposium on Food and Cookery.

The Oxford Companion took Davidson twenty years to complete. It ran to a million words on 892 pages. There were contributions from more than fifty writers, but most of the book was written by Davidson. Elizabeth David, like the Davidsons, lived in Chelsea, and she made her extensive library available to him. Through her he met her favoured specialist booksellers in London and New York who helped him add to his knowledge. When the Companion was published in 1999 The New York Times called it "The publishing event of the year, if not the decade", and The New Statesman said, "… the best food reference work ever to appear in the English language … read it and be dazzled."

Davidson died on 2 December 2003 at the Chelsea and Westminster Hospital, London, of heart failure, aged 79; he was survived by his wife and their three daughters.

== Recognition ==
Davidson accepted the award of the CMG on his retirement, but later regretted it, deleted mention of it from his Who's Who entry and refused further offers of official government recognition. In 2003 he received the Erasmus Prize from Queen Beatrix in Amsterdam in recognition of his establishing the Oxford symposium on food and cookery and writing the Oxford Companion.

In March 2010 BBC Four broadcast a television documentary called The Man Who Ate Everything, a portrait of Alan Davidson by Andrew Graham-Dixon.

== Publications ==
- Seafish of Tunisia and the Central Mediterranean, 1963 OCLC 44835703
- Mediterranean Seafood, 1972 ISBN 0140461744
- Seafood of South-east Asia, 1976, revised edition 2003, ISBN 1-903018-23-4
- Fish and Fish Dishes of Laos, 1975, ISBN 0-907325-95-5
- North Atlantic Seafood, 1980, ISBN 978-1-58008-450-5
- Oxford Symposium on National and Regional Styles of Cookery, editor, 1981
- Phia Sing: Traditional Recipes of Laos, editor, 1981, ISBN 0-907325-02-5
- Food in Motion: the migration of foodstuffs and cookery techniques: proceedings, editor, 1983
- On Fasting and Feasting: a personal collection of favourite writings on food and eating, 1988, ISBN 978-0-356-15637-8
- Seafood: a connoisseur's guide and cookbook, 1989, ISBN 0-85533-752-4
- A Kipper with my Tea: selected food essays, 1990, ISBN 978-0-333-47408-2
- The Cook's Room: a celebration of the heart of the home, 1991, ISBN 978-0-86824-456-3
- Fruit: a connoisseur's guide and cookbook, 1991, ISBN 0-85533-903-9
- Something Quite Big, 1993, ISBN 0-907325-51-3. (+ private copies printed in Bangkok, 1972)
- Oxford Companion to Food, 1999, ISBN 0-19-211579-0. 2nd edition 2006 ISBN 0-19-280681-5
- Trifle, 2001, with Helen Saberi, ISBN 1-903018-19-6
- The Wilder Shores of Gastronomy: twenty years of the best food writing from the journal "Petits Propos Culinaires" , editor,' with Helen Saberi, 2002, ISBN 1-58008-417-6
- The Penguin Companion to Food, 2000, ISBN 0-14-200163-5

== References and sources ==
=== Sources ===
- Davidson, Alan (1999). The Oxford Companion to Food. Oxford: Oxford University Press. ISBN 0-19211579-0.
