= Hindle Wakes =

Hindle Wakes may refer to:

- Hindle Wakes (play), a stage play by Stanley Houghton written in 1910
- Hindle Wakes (1918 film), a 1918 British silent film drama, based on the play
- Hindle Wakes (1927 film), a 1927 British silent film drama, based on the play
- Hindle Wakes (1931 film), a 1931 British film drama, based on the play
- Hindle Wakes (1952 film), a 1952 British film drama, based on the play
- Hindle Wakes (dish), a poultry dish associated mainly with the Bolton area of England
