= Jane Grigson =

English cookery writer (1928–1990)

Grigson in September 1989

Jane Grigson (born Heather Mabel Jane McIntire; 13 March 1928 – 12 March 1990) was an English cookery writer. In the latter part of the 20th century she was the author of the food column for The Observer and wrote numerous books about European cuisines and traditional British dishes. Her work proved influential in promoting British food.

Born in Gloucestershire, Grigson was raised in Sunderland, North East England, before studying at Newnham College, Cambridge. In 1953 she became an editorial assistant at the publishing company Rainbird, McLean, where she was the research assistant for the poet and writer Geoffrey Grigson. They soon began a relationship which lasted until his death in 1985; they had one daughter, Sophie. Jane worked as a translator of Italian works, and co-wrote books with her husband before writing Charcuterie and French Pork Cookery in 1967. The book was well received and, on its strength, Grigson gained her position at The Observer after a recommendation by the food writer Elizabeth David.

Grigson continued to write for The Observer until 1990; she also wrote works that focused mainly on British food—such as Good Things (1971), English Food (1974), Food With the Famous (1979) and The Observer Guide to British Cookery (1984)—or on key ingredients—such as Fish Cookery (1973), The Mushroom Feast (1975), Jane Grigson's Vegetable Book (1978), Jane Grigson's Fruit Book (1982) and Exotic Fruits and Vegetables (1986). She was awarded the John Florio Prize for Italian translation in 1966, and her food books won three Glenfiddich Food and Drink Awards and two André Simon Memorial Prizes.

Grigson was active in political lobbying, campaigning against battery farming and for animal welfare, food provenance and smallholders; in 1988 she took John MacGregor, then the Minister of Agriculture, Fisheries and Food, to task after salmonella was found in British eggs. Her writing put food into its social and historical context with a range of sources that includes poetry, novels and the cookery writers of the Industrial Revolution era, including Hannah Glasse, Elizabeth Raffald, Maria Rundell and Eliza Acton. Through her writing she changed the eating habits of the British, making many forgotten dishes popular once again.

== Biography ==
=== Early life; 1928–1965 ===
Grigson's almae matres

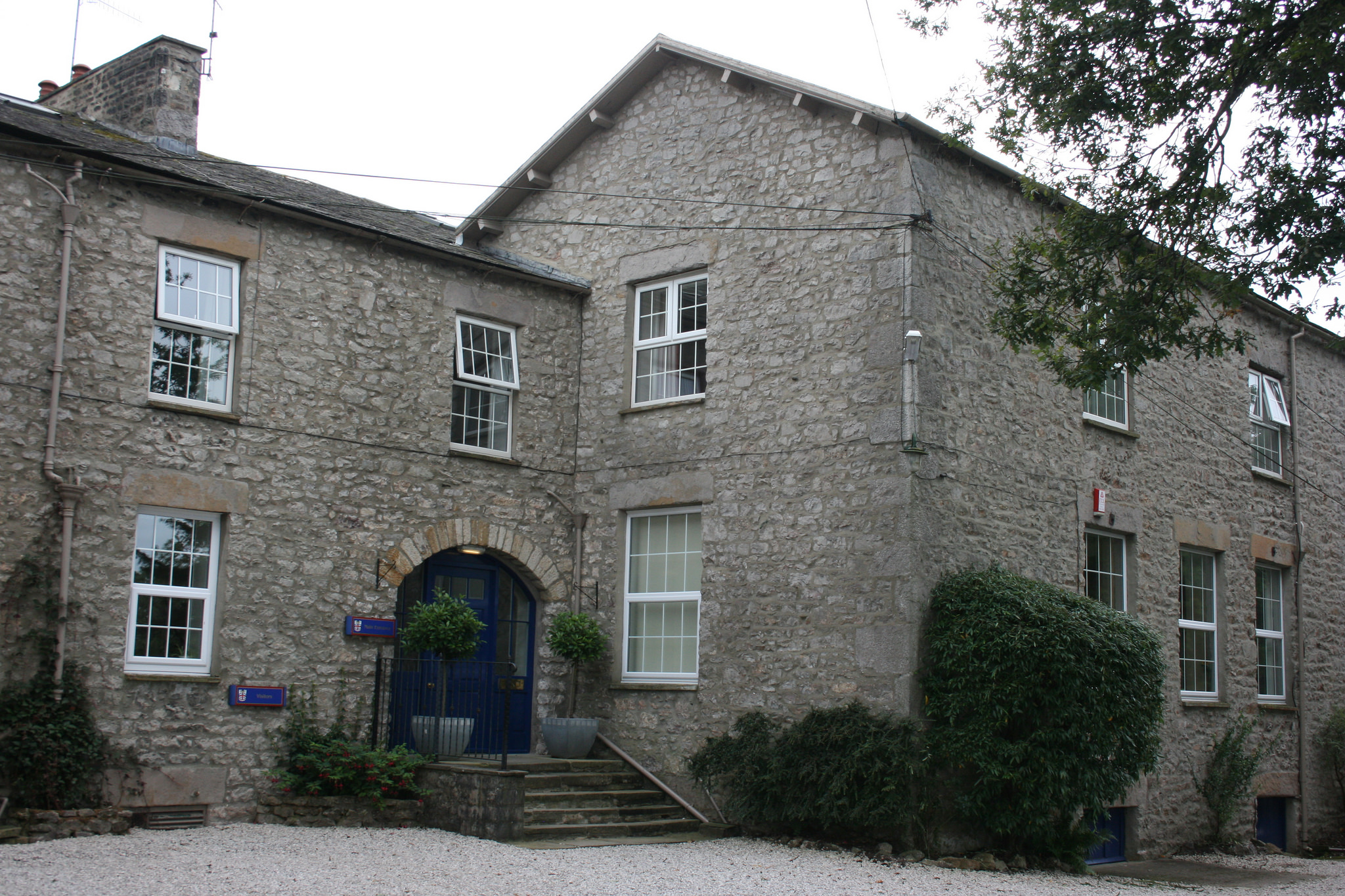
Casterton School, Westmorland, Cumbria

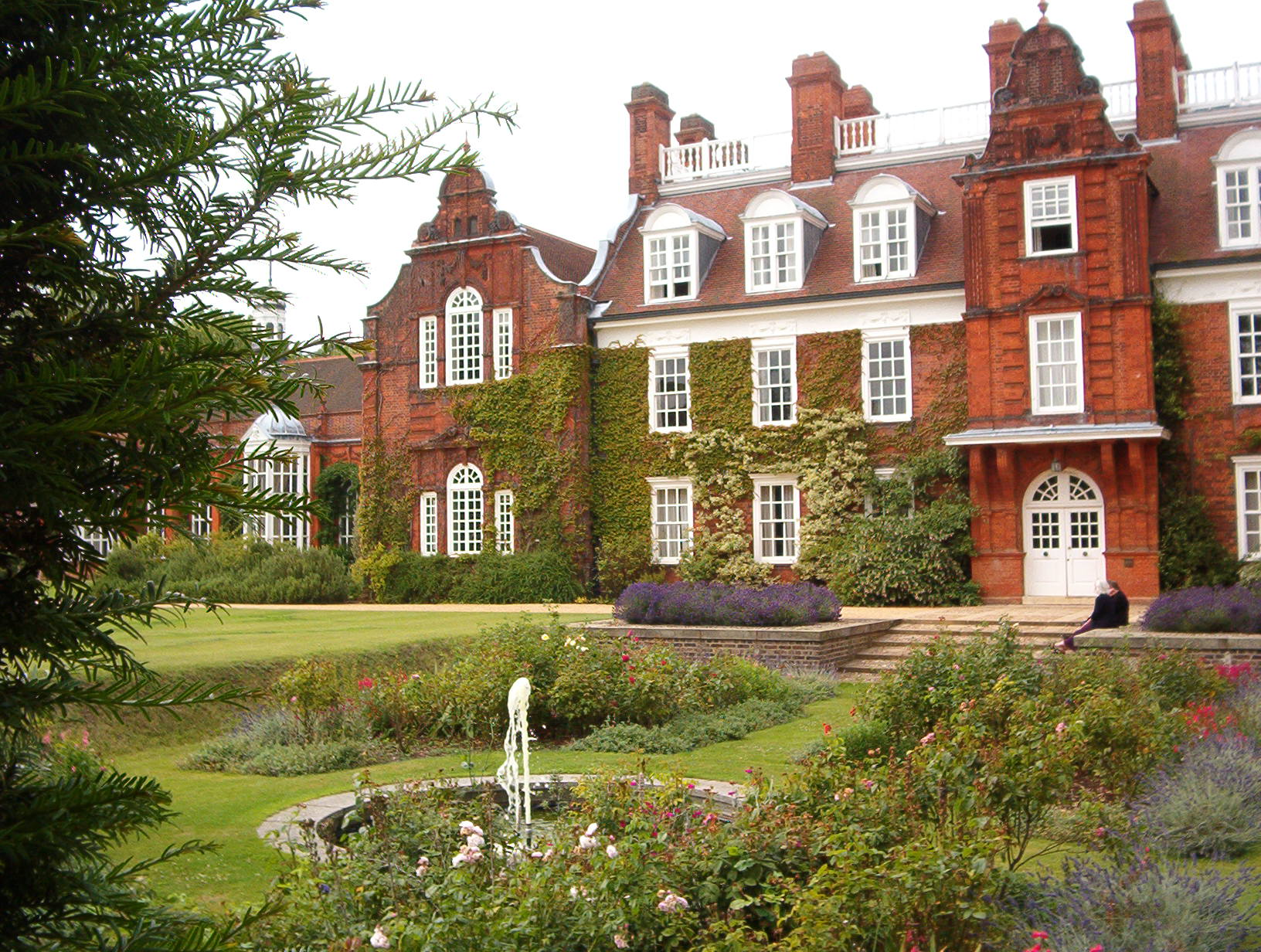
Newnham College, Cambridge

Grigson was born Heather Mabel Jane McIntire on 13 March 1928 in Gloucester, Gloucestershire, the daughter of George and Doris McIntire. George was a solicitor and the deputy town clerk of Gloucester; Doris was an artist. Grigson later said that home was where she "first learnt about good English food". After he had been involved in the closure of an abattoir, George gave up eating meat. When Grigson was four the family moved to Sunderland, North East England. She picked up a trace of a north-east accent that remained with her, and what the Oxford Dictionary of National Biography calls a "quietly left-wing" political viewpoint. During the Second World War, Sunderland was a target of Luftwaffe bombs, so Grigson and her sister Mary were sent to Casterton School, a boarding school in Westmorland. She then gained a place at Newnham College, Cambridge to read English literature.

After university Grigson travelled around Italy, and lived for three months in Florence. On her return to the UK she became the assistant to Bryan Robertson, the curator at the Heffer Gallery in Cambridge; an interest in painting, silver and textiles led her to apply for positions at the Victoria and Albert Museum, but she was unsuccessful. She worked in a junior capacity in an art gallery on Bond Street; she thought the watercolours were old-fashioned, and she later said that "I wished to rip everything off the walls and hang up [works by] Ben Nicholson". She began writing art reviews for the Sunderland Echo, covering subjects such as fine pottery, the Renaissance and the work of Clarkson Frederick Stanfield. In 1953 she became an editorial assistant at the publishing company Rainbird, McLean, a position she held for two years, during which time she was the research assistant for the poet and writer Geoffrey Grigson. He was married, and twenty-three years older than she, but they began a relationship and shortly afterwards she moved to the Farmhouse at Broad Town, Wiltshire, which had been his family home since 1945. He and his wife did not divorce; his estranged wife refused to grant him one. (Note: Geoffrey Grigson eventually divorced his wife in 1976; he and Jane married in 1976 in Swindon.) Instead, in the mid-1950s, McIntire changed her name by deed poll to Jane Grigson. (Note: In the UK during the 1950s, divorce was seen by many as shameful, and many lived out of wedlock but supposedly respectably.)

In 1959 the Grigsons had a daughter, Sophie, who later became a food writer and television presenter. Shortly after the birth, the couple purchased a cave-cottage in Trôo, France, (Note: Trôo, in the Loir Valley (not Loire), has numerous troglodyte or semi-troglodyte dwellings still in use. It was one of these that the Grigsons purchased. The cave had no electricity, water or gas.) and it was there, according to the Oxford Dictionary of National Biography, that Grigson developed a conviction that "because cooking is a central part of life it should be as carefully written about as any other art form".

Grigson worked for ten years as a translator from Italian, and in 1959 she wrote a new translation of Carlo Collodi's fairy tale The Adventures of Pinocchio, which she thought was "the only version of Pinocchio to transmit the liveliness and toughness of the original". She translated Gian Antonio Cibotto's 1962 work Scano Boa in 1963 and, the same year, also translated Cesare Beccaria's 1764 work Dei delitti e delle pene; the work was published as Of Crimes and Punishments, and it won the 1966 John Florio Prize for Italian translation. Jane and Geoffrey then worked on a joint project aimed at juveniles that looked at the meaning of 65 artworks in the context of their time and their enduring impact; Shapes and Stories was published in 1964. The Times and The Guardian both thought it "original and beautiful". A follow-up work, Shapes and Adventures, was published in 1967.

=== Mid-1960s to mid-1970s ===
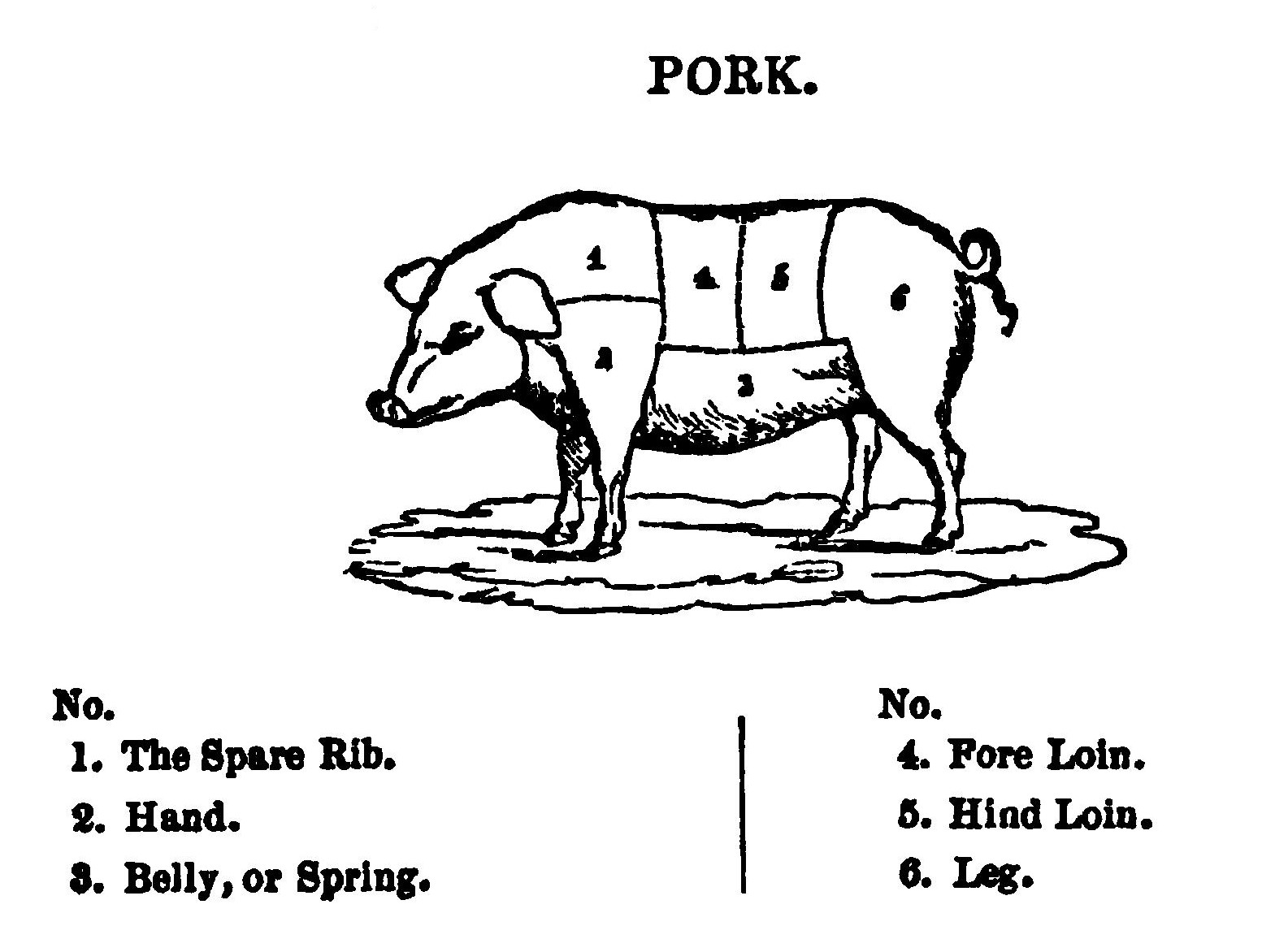
Charcuterie and French Pork Cookery: the pig, "delightful when cooked or cured, from his snout to his tail", according to Grigson.

In the mid-1960s Grigson was persuaded by her friend, Adey Horton, to co-author a book on pork. Horton dropped out part-way through the project and, in 1967, Grigson published Charcuterie and French Pork Cookery. The reviewer in The Times commented, "the research is detailed, the recounting lively, the information fascinating, the recipes complete from head to tail." In a tour d'horizon of cookery books in 1977, Elizabeth David called the book "A valuable work on the salting, curing and cooking of pork ... as practised by French households as well as by professional charcutiers", and commented on its "authentic recipes, practical approach and good writing".

On the strength of Charcuterie and French Pork Cookery—and a subsequent lunch—David recommended Grigson to The Observer as their food writer; Grigson began her weekly column with the paper the following year. For her first article she wrote about strawberries, but was unsure of how to approach the topic. Her husband suggested "we'll find out what the strawberry has meant to people, what they have done to it, how they have developed it and so on". She used the same approach for most of her future columns.

Jay Rayner, one of her successors in the role, writes that Grigson "established ... [the] newspaper's reputation as a publication that was serious about food". Nigel Slater, another successor, considers her writing "legendary". She held the position until 1990. Grigson and her husband would spend three months a year in Trôo—sometimes visiting twice a year—writing there and at their home in Broad Town, Wiltshire. While in France she "delighted in proving to ... [her] French friends that British cooking could be every bit as good as theirs", according to her daughter. Her articles in The Observer provided the basis of further books; in 1971 her columns provided material for Good Things, which she introduced by saying it "is not a manual of cookery, but a book about enjoying food". Harold Wilshaw, the food writer for The Guardian, thought it a "magnificent book ... worth the money for the chapter on prunes alone" The Times considers it "perhaps the most popular of her books". Nika Hazelton, reviewing it for The New York Times writes that it is "a delight to read and to cook from. The author is literate, her food interesting but unaffected". The chef and food writer Samin Nosrat lists Good Things as one of "the classic cookbooks that shaped my career as a chef and writer", alongside Jane Grigson's Fruit Book and Jane Grigson's Vegetable Book. (Note: The other works on Nosrat's list are Elizabeth David's Italian Food and French Provincial Cooking; Honey From a Weed by Patience Gray and The Art of Eating by M. F. K. Fisher. Of these works, Nosrat says "While I've learned almost nothing about cooking technique from them, their writing has collectively taught me more about how cooking, food writing and eating should feel: full of beauty and pleasure.")

In 1973 Grigson was invited by the Wine and Food Society to write Fish Cookery. According to the food writer Geraldene Holt, it was not common in Britain at that time for fish to be the main course at a formal meal; by the time Grigson came around to writing the updated edition in 1993, attitudes and tastes had changed, and a wider variety of fish was available for purchase.

a good many things in our marketing system now fight against simple and delicate food. Tomatoes have no taste. The finest flavoured potatoes are not available in shops. Vegetables and fruits are seldom fresh. Milk comes out of Friesians. Cheeses are subdivided and imprisoned in plastic wrapping. 'Farm fresh' means eggs that are no more than ten, fourteen or twenty days old.

— Grigson, introduction to English Food

Grigson opened her 1974 work, English Food with "English cooking—both historically and in the mouth—is a great deal more varied and delectable than our masochistic temper in this matter allows". On reading the book, Roger Baker, reviewing in The Times, described Grigson as "probably the most engaging food writer to emerge during the last few years"; he thought the book had "a sense of fun, a feeling for history, a very readable style and a love of simple, unaffected cooking". The Times later described English Food as being "a work to set alongside Elizabeth David's books on French and Italian cuisine". Holt records that with the book, "Grigson had become a crusader for the oft-maligned cooking of the British Isles"; she became an early critic of battery farming and passionate about the provenance of food. (Note: In one of her columns in The Observer she warned her readers against "barn eggs", as it concealed "some concentration camp under the nice Cotswold-tiled words".) The same year, Grigson was a contributor to The World Atlas of Food. The book was described by the food writer Elizabeth Ray as "by its nature both expensive and superficial", and by Baker as containing "hectic catch-lines on every page ... a thinness in the writing".

Over the next three years Grigson returned to producing books dealing with key categories of food: two booklets, Cooking Carrots and Cooking Spinach were published in 1975, as was The Mushroom Feast. The last of these was described by Kirkus Reviews as "A beautiful collection of recipes and culinary lore"; the reviewer for The Observer noted that "Grigson gives you more than recipes. She takes you down the byways of folklore and literature". Grigson described it as "the record of one family's pursuit of mushrooms, both wild and cultivated, over the last twenty years". Unlike many of her other books it owed little to her previously published articles, but drew on her family's experiences as mushroom enthusiasts. The idea of writing a book on fungi came to her after a friend in Trôo introduced the Grigsons to mushroom gathering. For him, as for other locals, "mushroom-hunting was part of the waste-nothing philosophy he had inherited from his farming peasant ancestors. ... mushrooms have long been accepted by chefs of the high cooking tradition in France: there is no question of allowing them to go to waste as we do so unregardingly". She had gradually concluded that few available books did justice to mushrooms and other fungi: "Most cookery books—always excepting Plats du Jour by Patience Gray and Primrose Boyd—are useless". Reviewing the first edition, Skeffington Ardron wrote in The Guardian that choosing between the many recipes "will drive you wild, for there is here such a magnificent collection" ranging from simple economical dishes to "the extravagant, impossible, ridiculous Poulard Derbe with its champagne, foie gras and truffles".

=== 1978 to 1985 ===
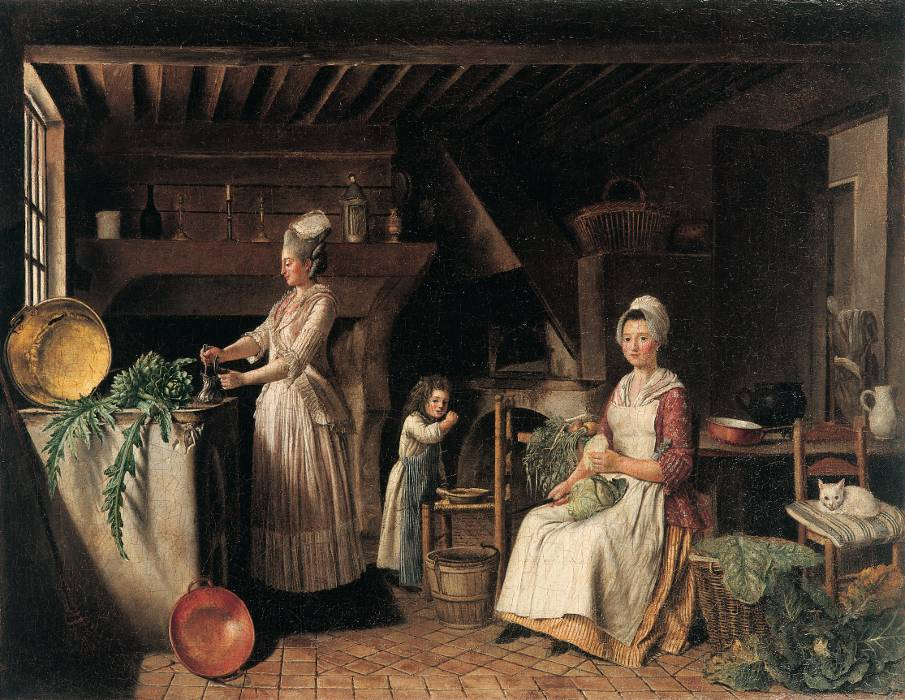
Antoine Raspal's L'intérieur de cuisine was used as the cover for the 1980 Penguin edition of Jane Grigson's Vegetable Book.

In 1978 Grigson wrote Jane Grigson's Vegetable Book. Reviewing the book in the first edition of Petits Propos Culinaires, Jane Davidson wrote "Erudition and commonsense are not always bedfellows. In this book they snuggle happily together. ... it is light on the eye and invigorating to the imagination." Writing about the first edition, the food writer Robin McDouall said in The Times that the book was "worthy to stand on the shelf by her Fish Cookery and her Charcuterie and French Pork Cookery—praise could go no higher". He commented that the cuisines of many countries were covered, but the main ones were French, Greek, Turkish and Arab. In The New York Times Mimi Sheraton wrote that the book was a "large, handsome volume [with] helpful shopping, storing and cooking information on all the vegetables included in recipes, and the range of dishes is worldwide if strongest on European specialties". Sheraton remarked on the "especially good lentil recipes, wonderful fragrant and bracing soups, and intriguing preparations for lesserknown vegetables such as chayote squash, Jerusalem artichokes and hop shoots". Wilshaw, reviewing the paperback edition for The Guardian, praised Grigson's "warm and erudite style ... an encyclopaedic account of vegetables, their history and their place in modern kitchens". In 1986 The Guardian polled its readers to discover their most indispensable cookery books; Jane Grigson's Vegetable Book took the second place, behind Elizabeth David's French Provincial Cooking but ahead of other books by David and by Madhur Jaffrey, Delia Smith, Claudia Roden and Julia Child.

In July 1978 Grigson was interviewed for Desert Island Discs by Roy Plomley. Among her selections were poetry recordings by her husband, one of his books—Notes from an Odd Country—and, as her luxury item, a typewriter and paper. (Note: Grigson's choices were: Schubert's "The Shepherd on the Rock"; Bach's Mass in B minor; Geoffrey Grigson's reading of his own poem "Hollowed Stone"; Nellie Lutcher singing "Cool Water"; Guy Béart's "Quand Au Temple"; Schumann's "Träumerei"; Mozart's "Bei Männern, welche Liebe fühlen" (from The Magic Flute); and the Nocturne from Britten's Serenade for Tenor, Horn and Strings.)

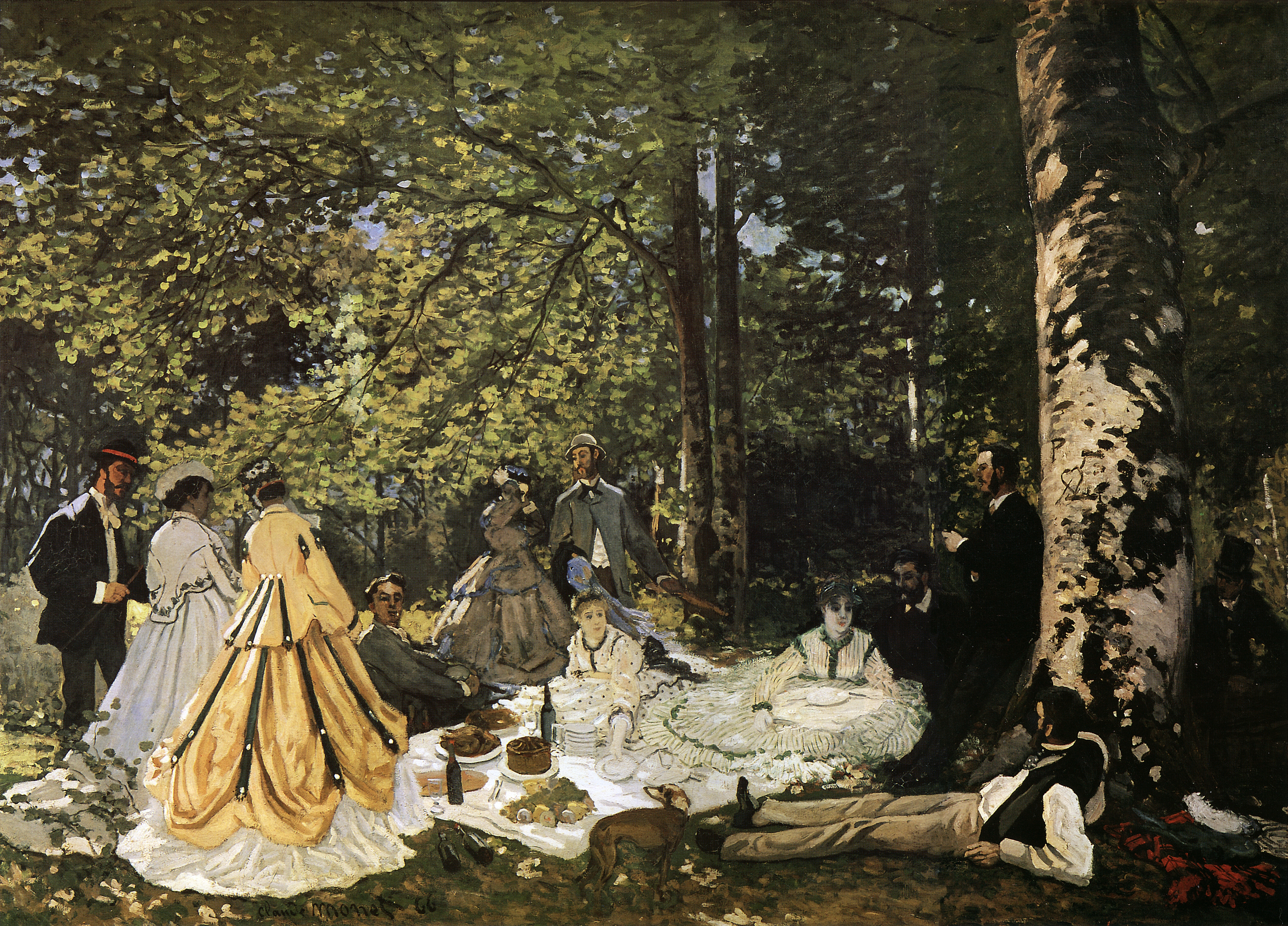
Monet's Le Déjeuner sur l'herbe; a section of the painting was depicted on the cover of Food with the Famous (1979)

Following a series of articles Grigson wrote for her column in The Observer, she published Food With the Famous in 1979, a look at the food eaten by various figures through history. The critic for Kirkus Reviews thought "Grigson's leisurely quotation-studded essays are almost too tantalizing; eventually one begins to miss the factual data (accounts of recipe-adaptations, etc.)" while the reviewer for the Birmingham Daily Post described it as "a charming book about food, rather than a cookery book". From late 1979 to 1980 the chef Anne Willan wrote "French Cookery School", a sixteen-part series in The Observer. The series was collated into a book, The Observer French Cookery School, with Grigson adding information on French cuisine.

In 1981 Grigson was a participant at the second Oxford Symposium on Food and Cookery, along with Elizabeth David. The symposium was founded by the food historian Alan Davidson and the social historian Theodore Zeldin.

Grigson published Jane Grigson's Fruit Book in 1982, a companion book to her Vegetable Book. Prue Leith, the cookery editor for The Guardian, said the book was "a great read and a vital leg-up for the cook temporarily bereft of ideas beyond apple pie. ... There are literary, historical, and travel anecdotes, interleaved with solid information". Reviewing the book in the New York Times, Sheraton wrote that the book was "readable and spirited, with ... [a] diverse combination of practical information, enticing recipes and romantic lore and food history, all tempered with humor and goodwill".

In 1983 Grigson published The Observer Guide to European Cookery. The paper sent her on what she called "a cook's tour" of European countries in early 1981 to explore and write about their cuisines. Political difficulties and a limited timetable obliged her to miss many countries; those she visited and wrote about were Greece, Italy, Spain, Portugal, France, Britain, the Scandinavian countries, Germany, Austria and Hungary. Russia had seemed likely to be omitted, because of the inefficiency and obstructiveness of Soviet officials, but Pamela Davidson, a friend based in Moscow, stepped into the breach, producing "the most informative part of the book, which tells us exactly what Soviet citizens eat and give their friends". Grigson's experiences were published as a ten-week series in the paper before being published in book form. Leith, in The Guardian, wrote that, despite reading the columns in the newspaper, she was able to "read them again with undiminished pleasure". A sixty-minute video was produced by The Observer showing Grigson preparing six of the book's recipes. Shona Crawford Poole, reviewing for The Times, thought it showed "Grigson's agreeable manner ... allied to great good sense".

Grigson's next book, The Observer Guide to British Cookery, was published in 1984, for which Grigson and her husband travelled round the UK to sample local fare. In her introduction she said "I think it helps if we try to consider the origins of our food, and its appropriateness." Her aim for the book, was to "make us all think out the best way of eating good honest food, seemly food if you like, at levels and in a style that are recognisably and proudly our own". Alan Davidson, reviewing for Petits Propos Culinaires, observed Grigson's long-held interest in British food, and thought "the quality of her writing shines as brightly as ever". The journalist Digby Anderson, reviewing in The Spectator, stated "This is 'expanded from her articles for The Observer Magazine'. Thus it is not pure Grigson but has additives, preservatives and a good deal of artificial colouring", although he allowed "There are splendid recipes, good general advice and useful tips in British Cooking".

=== 1985 to 1990 ===
Geoffrey Grigson died in November 1985. Jane said that when married, "each day was vivid", "he made every ordinary day exciting and worth living". The following year she was diagnosed with cervical cancer. In a letter to the writer Colin Spencer soon afterwards, she said "When I first got cancer ... I welcomed the thought of joining him in the churchyard." After medical treatment, the cancer went into remission.

Not long after Geoffrey's death, Jane Grigson began to take an active role in food lobbying. She campaigned for animal welfare, she promoted food provenance and smallholders. It was a subject she had long thought important; in 1971, in the introduction to Good Food, she wrote:

The encouragement of fine food is not greed or gourmandise; it can be seen as an aspect of the anti-pollution movement in that it indicates concern for the quality of the environment. This is not the limited concern of a few cranks. Small and medium-sized firms, feeling unable to compete with the cheap products of the giants, turn to producing better food. A courageous pig-breeder in Suffolk starts a cooked pork shop in the high charcuterie style; people in many parts of the country run restaurants specialising in local food; I notice in grocer's shops in our small town the increasing appearance of bags of strong flour and the prominence given to eggs direct from the farm.

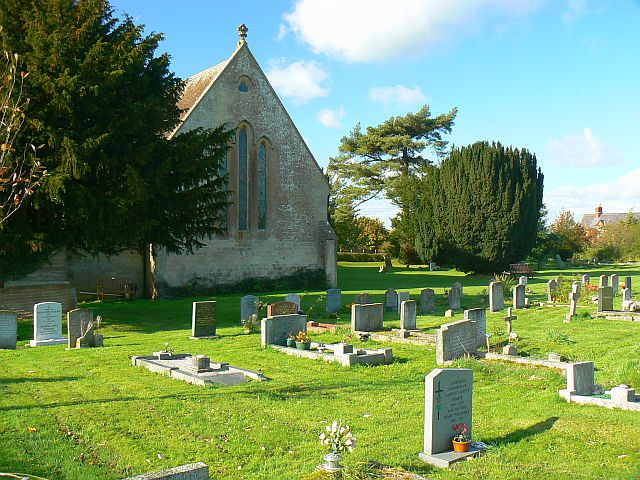
Christ Church and its churchyard, Broad Town; the cemetery for both Geoffrey and Jane Grigson

In 1988 Grigson took John MacGregor, then the Minister of Agriculture, Fisheries and Food, to task after salmonella was found in British eggs. She told McGregor "I advise action, not just another research committee. You may get away with allowing agribusiness to poison our drinking water; it cannot get away with eggs". She also became involved in the opposition to development around Avebury, the UNESCO World Heritage Site.

Grigson's last major work was Exotic Fruits and Vegetables, published in 1986. The impetus for the 128-page volume came from the artist Charlotte Knox, who offered the publisher, Jonathan Cape, a portfolio of coloured drawings of exotic fruits and vegetables. Grigson's "idea was to make an album in 19th-century style with plates vivid enough for people to be excited by them, to want to pick them off the page and try them for themselves."

Grigson's cancer returned in the middle of 1989 and she underwent chemotherapy in September that year; she died on 12 March 1990 at Broad Town. She was buried in the cemetery of Christ Church, the local church, alongside Geoffrey. A memorial service for Grigson was held at St Margaret's, Westminster in June 1990; the speakers providing the eulogies were the food writers Derek Cooper and Paul Levy.

== Broadcasting ==
Unlike Elizabeth David, who avoided broadcasting, (Note: David's reluctance to broadcast extended to absenting herself from a programme celebrating her work, although Grigson, Michel Roux, Hugh Johnson, Prue Leith, Joyce Molyneux and others took part.) Grigson appeared from time to time on radio and television. In 1984 she joined Prue Leith, Anton Mosimann, Albert Roux and two others in the Channel 4 television series Take Six Cooks, in which well-known cooks dined together at the Dorchester Hotel in London and each then presented their thoughts on and recipes for a particular course or dishes. Leith presented hors d'oeuvres, Mosimann fish, Roux meat and Grigson vegetables. In a book associated with the series eight of her recipes were included. As was her usual practice, she interspersed classic recipes—carrots à la Forestière (Note: Braised in beef stock and served with a mushroom and cream sauce.) and peas in the French style with spring onions and lettuce—with less well known dishes such as artichokes stuffed with a purée of broad beans.

On BBC radio she took part in interviews and panel discussions giving her views on ingredients and advice on techniques, and in a 1989 programme she presented a portrait of Elizabeth Raffald and her 18th-century recipes. On BBC television she extolled her heroes—Elizabeth David, Henry James and Geoffrey Grigson, demonstrated how to roast and stuff a goose, went in search of Britain's best fresh produce, gave advice for the health-conscious about cooking vegetables, and joined other cooks at the Savoy Hotel to supervise show-business celebrities attempting to cook classic dishes.

== Works ==
Books by Jane Grigson

	Publisher	Year	Pages	Illustrator	OCLC/ISBN	Notes
Scano Boa by Gian Antonio Cibotto	Hodder and Stoughton	1963	126	–	OCLC 559238388	Translated by Jane Grigson
Of Crimes and Punishments by Cesare Beccari	Oxford University Press	1964	212	–	OCLC 772779957	Translated by Grigson. Volume also contains Allesandro Manzoni's The Column of Infamy translated by Kenelm Foster
Shapes and Stories	John Baker	1964	65	Various	OCLC 10474314	Collaboration with Geoffrey Grigson
Shapes and Adventures	John Marshbank	1967	70	Various	OCLC 458336	Collaboration with Geoffrey Grigson
Charcuterie and French Pork Cookery	Michael Joseph	1967	308	M.J. Mott	OCLC 13034368	
Good Things	Michael Joseph	1971	323	M.J. Mott	ISBN 978-0-7181-0728-4	
Fish Cookery	International Wine and Food Society	1973	288	Kenneth Swain	ISBN 978-0-7153-6100-9	Originally published as The International Wine and Food Society's Guide to Fish Cookery. The title has been shortened to its present form since publication as a Penguin paperback in 1975.
English Food	Macmillan	1974	322	Gillian Zeiner	OCLC 872651932	
The World Atlas of Food	Mitchell Beazley	1974	319	Ed Day and others	ISBN 978-0-600-55929-0	
The Mushroom Feast	Michael Joseph	1975	303	Yvonne Skargon	ISBN 978-0-7181-1253-0	
Cooking Carrots	Abson Books	1975	36	–	ISBN 978-0-902920-19-4	
Cooking Spinach	Abson Books	1976	36	–	ISBN 978-0-902920-24-8	
Jane Grigson's Vegetable Book	Michael Joseph	1978	607	Yvonne Skargon	ISBN 978-0-7181-1675-0	
Food With the Famous	Michael Joseph	1979	256	Various (reproductions of original portraits)	ISBN 978-0-7181-1855-6	
The Observer French Cookery School	Macdonald Futura	1980	305	Roger Phillips and others	ISBN 978-0-354-04523-0	(47 pages by Grigson; 258 by Ann Willan)
Jane Grigson's Fruit Book	Michael Joseph	1982	508	Yvonne Skargon	ISBN 978-0-7181-2125-9	
The Year of the French	Warren	1982	16	Glynn Boyd Harte	ISBN 978-0-9505969-6-9	
The Observer Guide to European Cookery	Michael Joseph	1983	266	Various	ISBN 978-0-7181-2233-1	Numerous coloured photographs by unnamed Observer photographers
The Observer Guide to British Cookery	Michael Joseph	1984	232	George Wright and others	ISBN 978-0-7181-2446-5	
Dishes from the Mediterranean	Woodhead Faulkner	1984	96	Robert Golden and Mandy Doyle	OCLC 57356351	
Exotic Fruits and Vegetables	Jonathan Cape	1986	128	Charlotte Knox	ISBN 978-0-224-02138-8	
The Cooking of Normandy	Martin Books	1987	96	Laurie Evans and Mandy Doyle	ISBN 978-0-85941-486-9	
The Enjoyment of Food: The Best of Jane Grigson	Michael Joseph	1992	464	Various	ISBN 978-0-7181-3562-1	
Jane Grigson's Desserts	Michael Joseph	1993	92	Sarah McMenemy	ISBN 978-0-7181-0043-8	On the dust jacket, but not the binding or the title page, "The Best of" is added in smaller type before the title.
Jane Grigson's Soups	Michael Joseph	1993	92	Jane Scrother	ISBN 978-0-7181-0042-1	As above, the dust jacket has the additional words, "The Best of".
Puddings	Penguin	1996	64	–	ISBN 978-0-14-095348-0	

=== 1960s ===
==== Charcuterie and French Pork Cookery (1967) ====
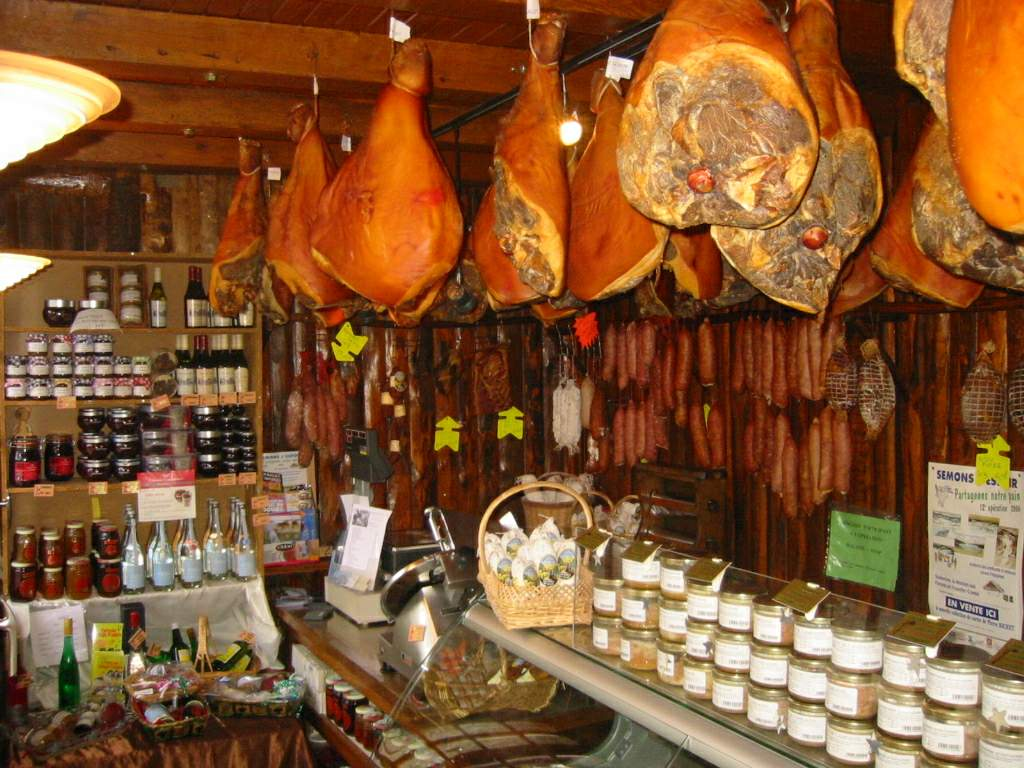
French charcuterie

Grigson's first book about food and cookery was Charcuterie and French Pork Cookery, published by Michael Joseph in 1967. After a brief introduction outlining the history of the pig in European agriculture and cuisine, the main text begins with a "Picnic guide to the charcutier's shop", in which the author details the pork products available in a good French charcuterie. They include dishes ready to eat, such as rillettes; pâtés; cooked and cured ham (such as jambons de York and de Bayonne); and cooked sausages of the salami and other types. Dishes that require cooking include pigs' trotters; sausages including andouillettes; black puddings; and, more expensive, boudins blancs. Also listed are cuts of fresh pork, from head to tail (tête and queue de porc).

Later chapters deal with charcuterie equipment; herbs and seasonings; and sauces and relishes. They are followed by four substantial chapters of recipes for terrines, pâtés (cold and hot), and galantines; sausages and boudins blancs; salt pork and hams; and the main cuts of fresh pork. The final four chapters cover the "Extremities"; "Insides"; "Fat"; and "Blood" (black puddings). Throughout, there are illustrative line drawings by M.J. Mott.

When the first American edition was published, in 1968, (Note: The American edition, published by Knopf, was titled The Art of Charcuterie. A paperback version from Knopf, issued in 1986, was titled The Art of Making Sausages, Pâtes, and Other Charcuterie.) three of the US's leading cookery writers—Julia Child, James Beard and Michael Field—called it "the best cook book of the year". In Britain, Penguin Books published a paperback edition in 1970. The book was out of print for some time in the late 1990s—the food correspondent of The Guardian encouraged readers to write to the publishers "and bully them into reprinting"—but was reissued in 2001 and (at 2019) has remained in print ever since. (Note: The publishers record seven reprintings of the 2001 issue between then and 2010.) In 2001 the chef Chris Galvin called the book "a masterpiece":

so informative and well written ... it feels that you have someone on hand to help, steering you through the recipe, avoiding unnecessary technical terms and instead using universal words and phrases, e.g. "whirling ingredients together", "simmering and not galloping a stock". Most importantly Grigson encourages you to attempt dishes insisting, for example, that making a sausage is a simple affair then following this statement up with recipe after recipe for saucisse fumé, saucisse de campagne and saussicon sec.

Translations of the book have been published in Dutch (Worst, Paté: en andere Charcuterie uit de Franse Keuken) and—unusually for a book on food by a British author—in French.

=== 1970s ===
==== Good Things (1971) ====
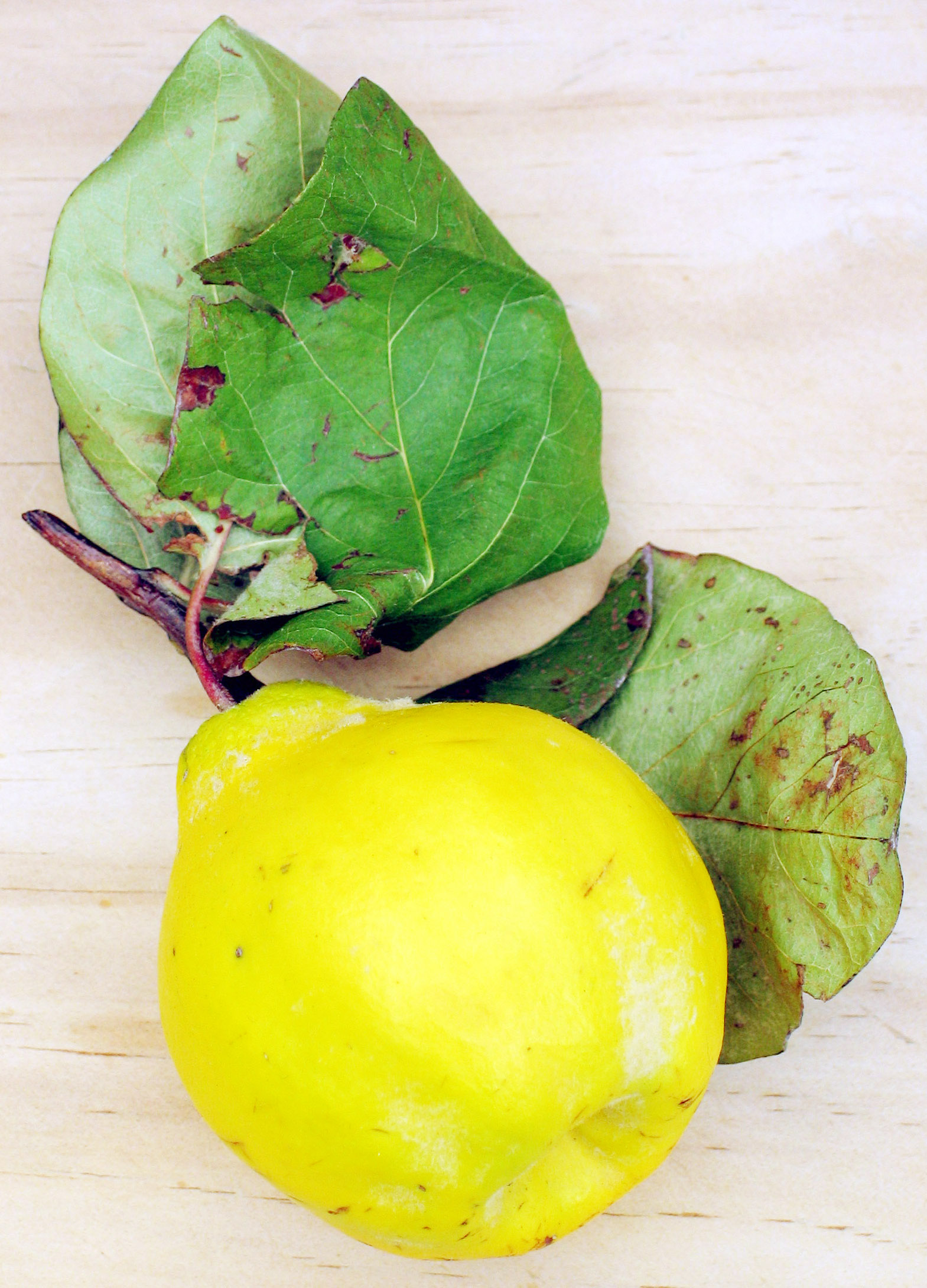
A quince: one of the six fruits featured in Good Things

The sections of the book deal with fish, meat and game, vegetables and fruit, with a miscellany to conclude. In some of Grigson's later books she dealt exhaustively with specific ingredients: her Fish Cookery two years later covered more than fifty varieties of fish. Here she deals with five: kippers, lobster, mussels, scallops and trout, writing about her few chosen subjects more expansively than in the later book, and discussing the pros and cons of various recipes. She says of lobsters that there is nothing more delicious, so sweet, firm and succulent, discusses the most humane way of killing them, and although advancing the proposition that they are best eaten hot with only lemon juice and butter on them, she gives the recipes for homard à l'Americaine (quoting Édouard de Pomiane's view that it is "a gastronomic cacophony") and Thermidor, as well as bisque, which she calls "without qualification ... the best of all soups". (Note: Homard à l'américaine is a dish of lobster sauteed in olive oil, with wine, tomatoes, garlic and herbs.)

Grigson adopts the same approach in the other sections, dealing at leisure with favoured ingredients and dishes. Not all her choices are the most frequently seen in other cookery books: in the meat section she devotes eight pages to snails, and ten to sweetbreads, and none to steaks or roasts. Among the six fruits she writes about, apples and strawberries are joined by quince and prunes. She agrees that stewed prunes endured at school or in prison—the "dreadful alliance between prunes and rice or prunes and custard powder"—are best forgotten, and makes her case for the prune as a traditional ingredient in meat and fish dishes, giving as examples beef or hare casseroled with prunes, turkey with prune stuffing, and tripe slowly simmered with prunes. In the final section she covers five French cakes, ice creams and sorbets, and fruit liqueurs.

WorldCat records 21 editions of Good Things published between 1971 and 2009 in English and translation. The original edition, like the charcuterie book four years earlier, had line drawings by M.J. Mott. A reprint by the Folio Society in 2009 had illustrations, some in colour, by Alice Tait.

==== Fish Cookery (1973) ====
The book was first published as The International Wine and Food Society's Guide to Fish Cookery in 1973, but became widely known in its paperback form with the shorter title, issued by Penguin in 1975. Grigson did not believe that anything is truly original in recipes, and happily included those of other writers in her books, being careful to acknowledge her sources—"There's nothing new about intellectual honesty". Her influences were not exclusively European: among those she credited in her Fish Cookery (1973) were Claudia Roden's A Book of Middle Eastern Food, Mary Lamb's New Orleans Cuisine and James Beard's Delights and Prejudices. Nevertheless, Fish Cookery is, of Grigson's books, the one most focused on the British cook, (Note: Unlike Grigson's other best-known books, Fish Cookery was not published in an American edition.) because, as she observes, the same edible birds and quadrupeds are found in many parts of the world, but species of fish are generally more confined to particular areas. Even given that limitation, Grigson urges her British readers to be more adventurous in their choice of fresh fish. She points out that there are more than fifty species native to British waters, not including shellfish or freshwater fish, and she urges cooks to venture beyond "cod and plaice, overcooked and coated with greasy batter".

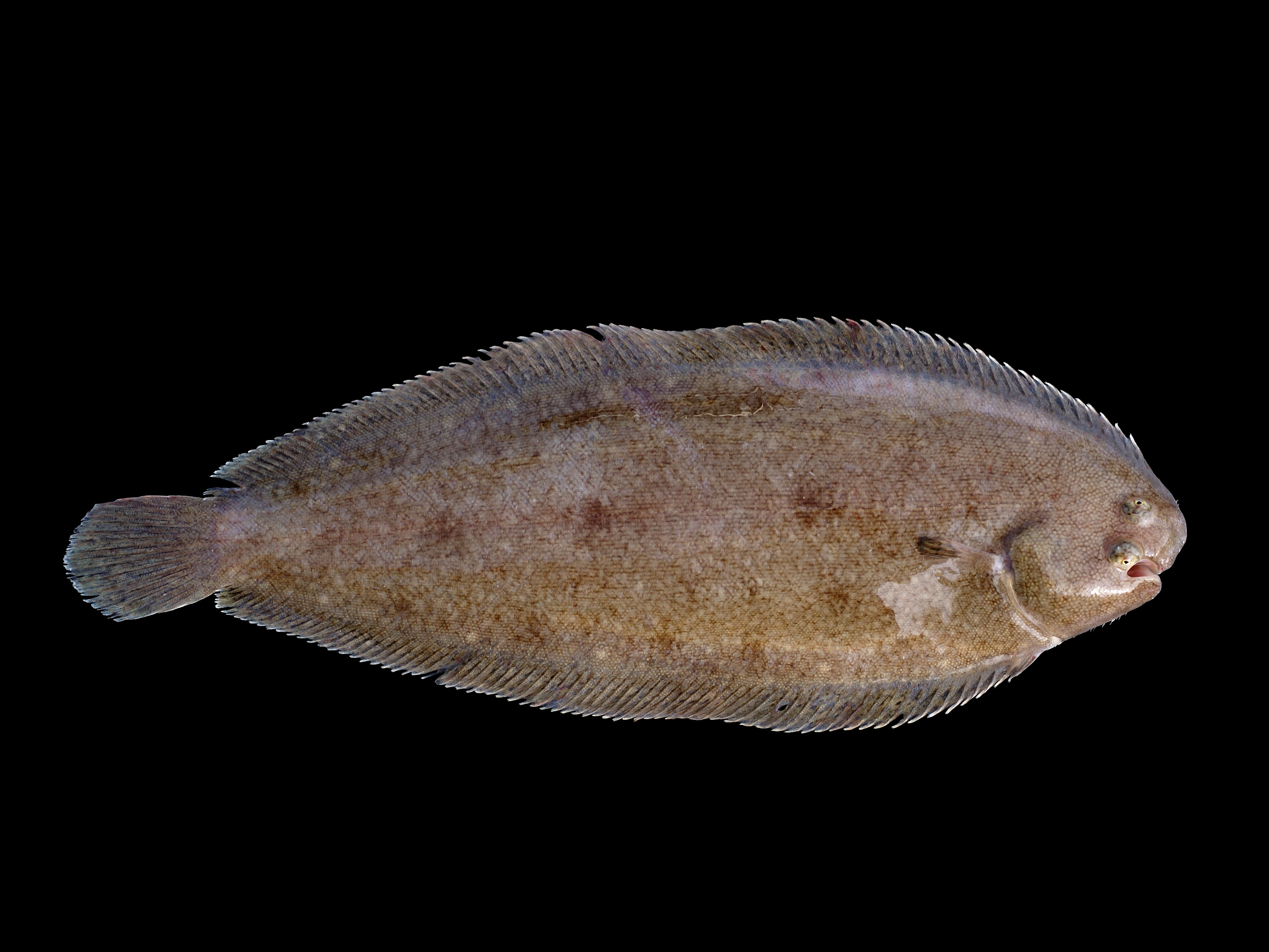
Dover sole: Among the finest fish in Grigson's view

The chapters of Fish Cookery are "Choosing, Cleaning and Cooking Fish"; "Court-bouillons, Sauces and Butters"; "Fish Stews and Soups"; "Flat-fish"; "More Fish from the Sea"; "The Great Fish"; "Fish Caught in Fresh Water"; "Shellfish and Crustaceans"; "and "Cured and Preserved Fish". The book concludes with glossaries of fish names and cookery terms and measures. "Great" in the title of the sixth chapter refers to size, rather than particular pre-eminence: it includes tuna, swordfish, shark and sunfish. Grigson ascribes greatness in the qualitative sense only to sole and turbot among sea fish, trout and salmon among fresh-water species, and eel, lobster and crayfish.

As well as classics such as sole Véronique, bouillabaisse, moules marinière, and lobster Thermidor, Grigson gives recipes for more unusual combinations of ingredients, including cod steaks with Gruyère cheese sauce, herring with gooseberries, scallop and artichoke soup, and prawns in tomato, cream and vermouth sauce.

A statement in the section on mussels led to minor controversy some years after publication. Grigson writes that once the mussels are cooked any that do not open should be thrown away. (Note: Grigson gave the same advice, identically worded, in Good Things the year before, but it was the 1973 iteration that attracted comment.) She gives no reason, but many subsequent writers have taken it that eating a closed mussel would be injurious, rather than simply impracticable. The Australian Fisheries Research and Development Corporation published research in 2012 to rebut the assumption. (Note: The corporation's research suggests that a closed mussel can be cooked longer, until the shell opens, or can be prised open with a knife, and is safely edible.)

Grigson had completed two-thirds of the text of a revised edition of the book when she died. Her editor, Jenny Dereham, completed the revision, using additional recipes and articles Grigson had published since 1973. It was published with the title Jane Grigson's Fish Book in 1993, in hardback by Michael Joseph and in paperback by Penguin. Reviewing the new edition in The Independent, Michael Leapman wrote that many of the recipes had been updated to reflect current tastes—"a little less cream and butter"—and remarked on Grigson's exploration of new areas of interest little known to readers of the first edition, such as sashimi and ceviche.

==== English Food (1974) ====
The book has the subtitle, "An anthology chosen by Jane Grigson". As in her earlier books, Grigson made no claim to originality in her recipes, and was scrupulous about crediting those with a known author. The chapters cover soups; cheese and egg dishes; vegetables; fish; meat, poultry and game; puddings; cakes, biscuits and pancakes; and stuffings, sauces and preserves. Line drawings by Gillian Zeiner illustrate details of kitchen techniques, materials and equipment. The introduction outlines Grigson's thoughts on good English cooking and its decline. Another point in the introduction is that whereas in France most of the great cookery writers have been men, in England it is the women writers, such as Hannah Glasse and Eliza Acton, who stand out. Many of their recipes are included in subsequent chapters. The introduction to the revised 1979 edition enlarges on the state of English food, and calls for better cookery teaching in British schools. Grigson emphasises the advantages of good, locally produced food, which she says, is not only better but usually cheaper than that offered by the large commercial concerns: "Words such as 'fresh' and 'home-made' have been borrowed by commerce to tell lies."

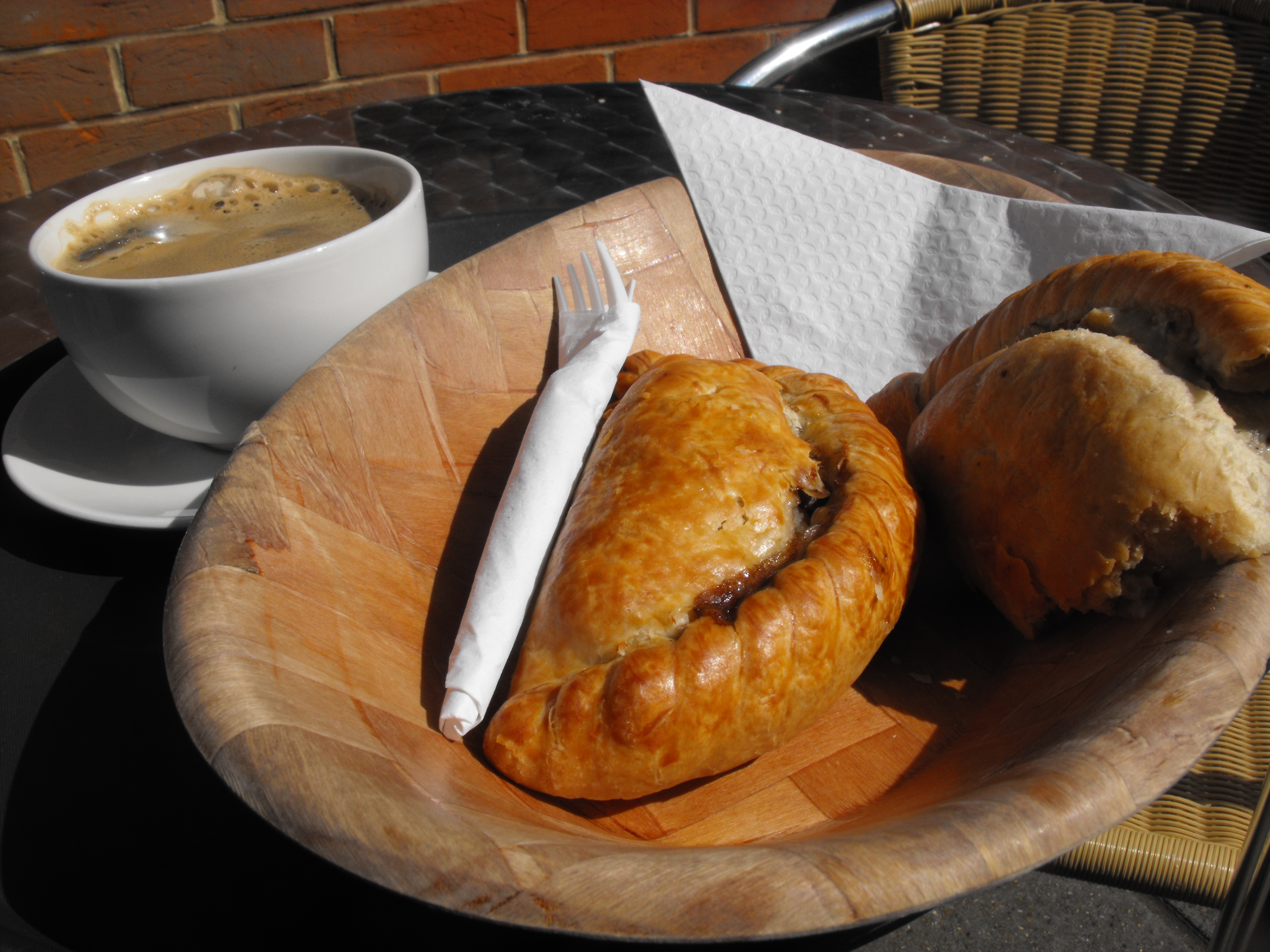
Cornish pasty

In a study of "The 50 best cookbooks" in 2010, Rachel Cooke wrote that it was debatable which of Grigson's "many wonderful books" was the best, "but the one for which she will always be most celebrated is English Food". Cooke quotes the critic Fay Maschler's view that Grigson "restored pride to the subject of English food and gave evidence that there is a valid regional quality still extant in this somewhat beleaguered cuisine."

The book contains mostly English recipes, but draws from time to time on the cuisines of Wales and Scotland. Cooke describes it as "undoubtedly a work of scholarship: carefully researched, wide-ranging and extremely particular" but adds that it also contains "hundreds of excellent recipes, the vast majority of them short, precise and foolproof. Who could resist poached turbot with shrimp sauce, or a properly made Cornish pasty?" Among the puddings in the book are Yorkshire curd tart, brown bread ice cream, queen of puddings and Sussex pond pudding.

English Food won the Glenfiddich Award for the cookery book of the year, 1974. A new edition, with an introduction by Sophie Grigson, was published by Ebury Press, London, in 2002. Reviewing it, Lindsey Bareham wrote, "If you don't already own a copy of this seminal book, now is the time to invest in our edible heritage made digestible by one of the finest writers we have ever produced".

==== The World Atlas of Food (1974) ====
Subtitled "A Gourmet's Guide to the Great Regional Dishes of the World", this 319-page book was published by Mitchell Beazley, a company specialising in atlases and other extensively illustrated works of reference. Grigson is credited as "contributing editor". (Note: The other 28 contributors included Wina Born, Alan Davidson, Arto Der Haroutunian, Hugh Johnson, Elisabeth Lambert Ortiz, Lynne Reid Banks and Alwynne Wheeler.) James Beard wrote the introduction, titled "An epicurean journey". The book has pages illustrating and describing ingredients of the various areas of the world—fish, meat, vegetables, fungi and fruit. The cuisines of Europe, Africa, Asia, Australasia and the Americas are covered. The American edition was published by Simon & Schuster in 1974. The book was reissued in Australia and the US in 1984 and in Britain in 1988 and was reprinted in 1989.

==== The Mushroom Feast (1975) ====
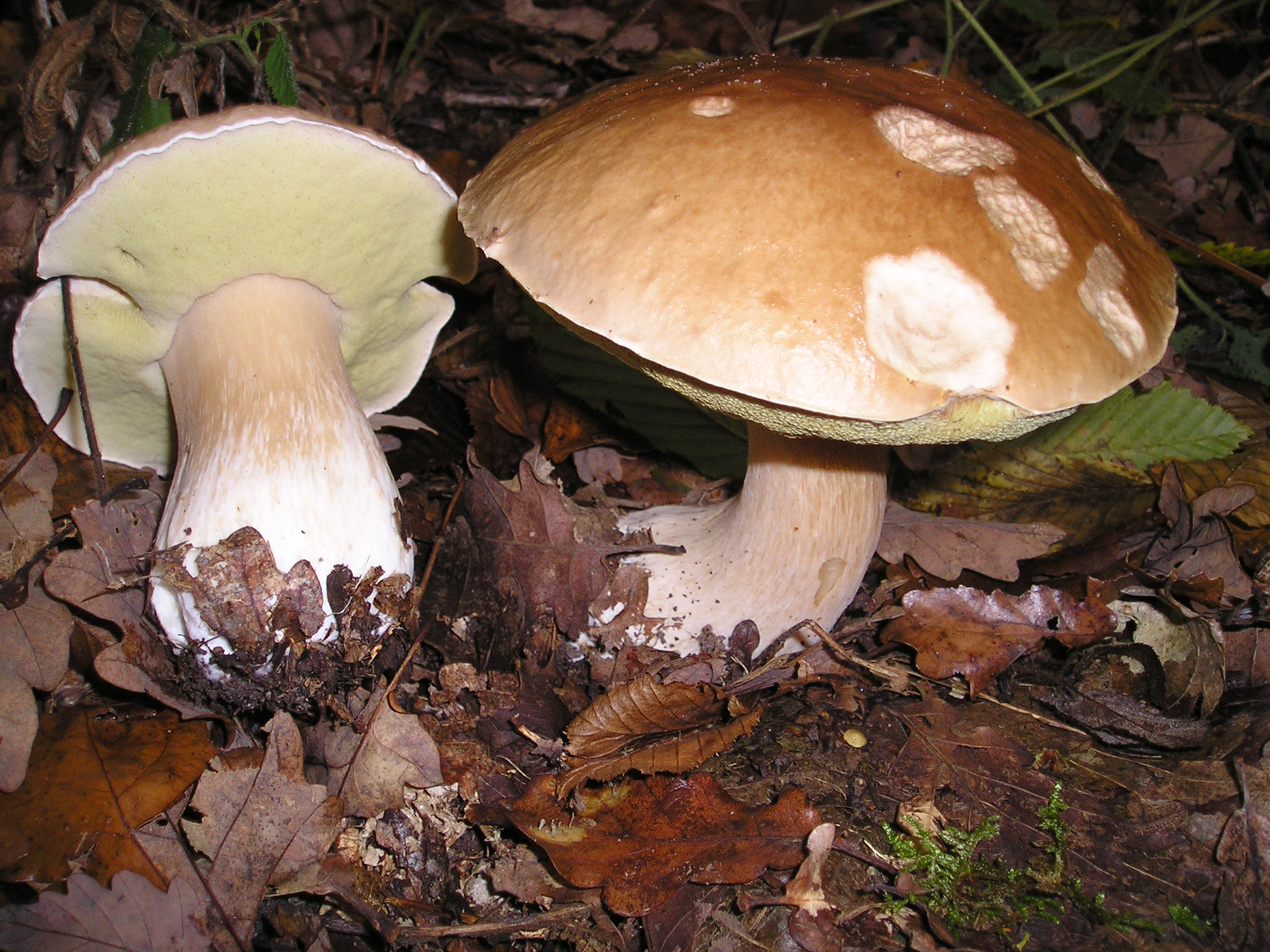
Cèpes

The Mushroom Feast was published by Michael Joseph in 1975. The book is in six chapters. The first, "The best edible mushrooms", has descriptions of twenty varieties of mushroom, from the familiar cultivated Agaricus bisporus, morels, cèpes, girolles and oysters, to the less well known matsutake, parasol, shaggy cap, wood-blewit and others. Each is illustrated with a line drawing by Yvonne Skargon, and followed by descriptions of the flavour and basic cooking instructions. The next chapter, dealing with preserved mushrooms, sauces, stuffings, and soups, gives modern and old recipes, including some by Hannah Glasse, Eliza Acton, Marie-Antoine Carême, Hilda Leyel and Grigson's mentor and friend Elizabeth David.

In the chapter on mushroom main dishes—such as in an open tart or a covered pie, in a gateau with cream, or stuffed with almonds, or baked in the Genoese style—other ingredients play a subordinate part in the recipes, but are given more prominence in "Mushrooms with fish" and "Mushrooms with meat, poultry, and game". After a section on the principal mushrooms of Japanese and Chinese cooking, an appendix gives five basic recipes for sauces to accompany mushrooms.

WorldCat records 18 editions of the book published between 1975 and 2008.

==== Jane Grigson's Vegetable Book (1978) ====
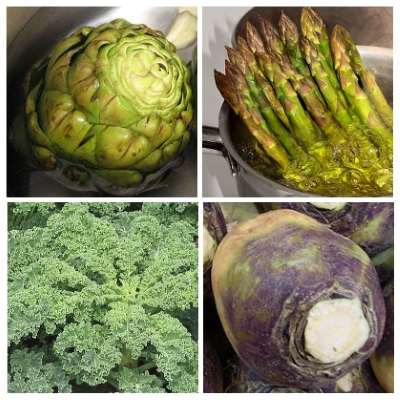
Grigson's vegetable heroes and villains: clockwise from top left artichoke, asparagus, swede and kale

For this book Grigson adopted a straightforward alphabetical layout. There are chapters on more than eighty vegetables, from artichokes to yams. Most chapters are in three parts: brief historical information about the vegetables, guidance on preparing them, and recipes using them. The author does not play down her own likes and dislikes; she praises artichokes (Note: By "artichoke" Grigson means the globe artichoke; the Jerusalem artichoke is given its two-word title.) and asparagus as "the two finest vegetables we can grow", but calls winter turnips and swedes "that grim pair", and admits to a lifelong detestation of kale. Seakale, on the other hand, she rates highly, not only for its delicate flavour, but as the only vegetable in the entire book native to England.

Grigson considered omitting mushrooms from the book, on the grounds that they are not a vegetable and that she had already devoted a whole book to them in 1975, but decided that "leaving them out won't do", and gave them a two-page chapter, covering their choice and preparation, and giving recipes for mushroom soup and mushroom pie. Also included are savoury fruits such as avocados and tomatoes. As well as ingredients familiar in European cuisine, Grigson includes sections on bean sprouts, Chinese artichokes, okra, sweet potato, pignuts and other vegetables less well known among her readership in the 1970s. The longest chapters are those on lettuces (13 pages), spinach and tomatoes (both 18 pages) and potatoes (24 pages).

In her preface to the first American edition in 1979, Grigson observed that although British and American cooks found each other's systems of measurement confusing (citing the US use of volume rather than weight for solid ingredients), the two countries were at one in suffering from supermarkets' obsession with the appearance rather than the flavour of vegetables.

The book brought its author her first Glenfiddich Food and Drink Writer of the Year Award and the first of two André Simon Memorial Prizes.

==== Food With the Famous (1979) ====
The book has its origins in a series of articles Grigson wrote for The Observer's colour magazine in 1978, and is described as part cookery book and part social history. Her publisher wrote that she "re-read favourite novels, re-examined pictures in the great galleries, explored houses, letters, journals, and the cookery books used (or written) by her choice of famous men and women". Starting with "the great diarist and salad fancier" John Evelyn in the 17th century, she traces a chronological development of western cooking. Her other examples are from the 18th century (Parson James Woodforde), the cusp of the 18th and 19th (Jane Austen, Thomas Jefferson, and the Rev Sydney Smith), the high-19th (Lord and Lady Shaftesbury, Alexandre Dumas and Émile Zola); and on into the 20th "with Marcel Proust in the gourmet's Paris, and Claude Monet among the water-lilies at Giverny".

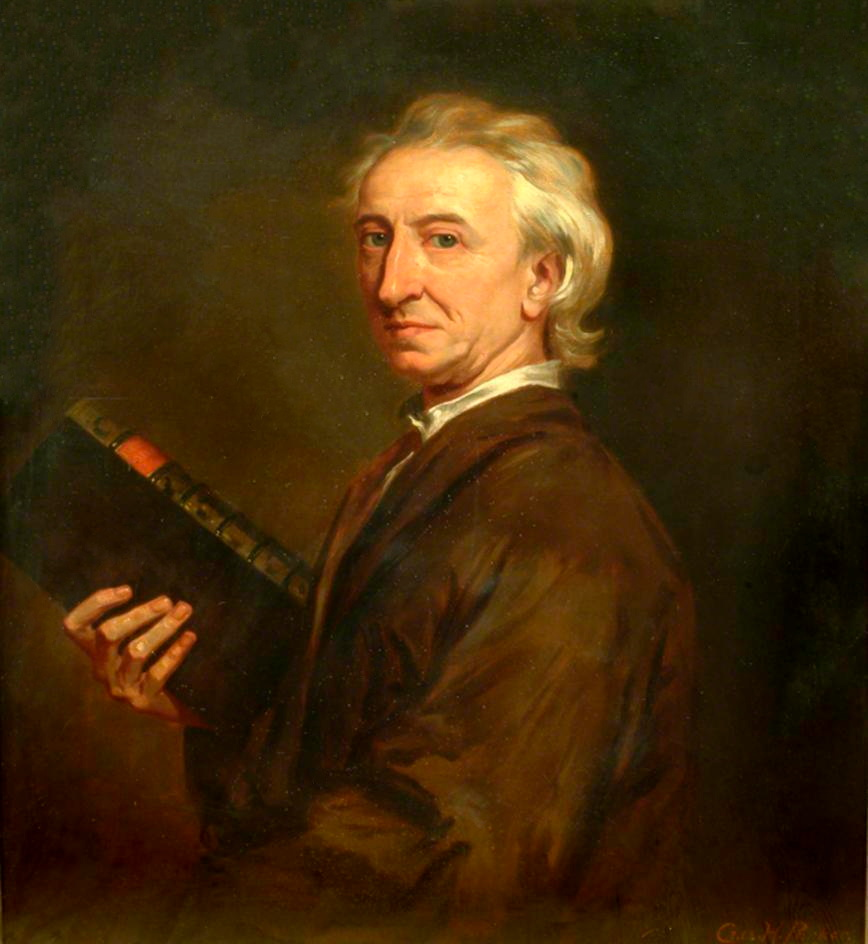
John Evelyn

Jane Austen

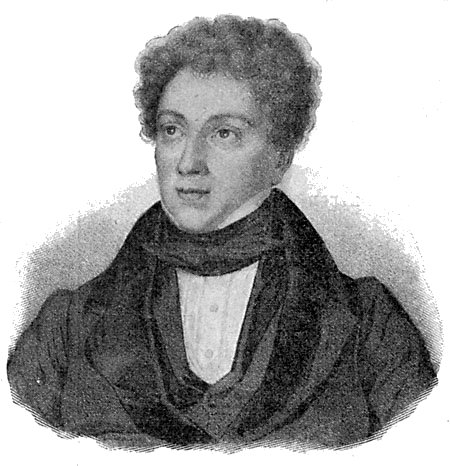
Alexandre Dumas

In the introduction to Evelyn's chapter, Grigson describes his contribution to British food—translating the works of Jean-Baptiste de La Quintinie, promoting ice-houses and recording the earliest example of the pressure cooker. She quotes him on vegetables, for instance on beetroot: "vulgar, but eaten with oil and vinegar, as usually, it is no despicable salad." Evelyn's garden was organised so that mixed green salad could be put on the table every day of the year; Grigson lists the 35 different species from balm to tripe-madam (Note: Anglicised form of the French tripe-madame: Sedum reflexum (Oxford English Dictionary).) that Evelyn specified for his salads. For the chapters on the novelists, Grigson gives recipes for dishes mentioned in their books, including white soup (Note: White soup, mentioned in Pride and Prejudice, was a staple of upper class entertainment in the 18th and early 19th century. It was made from onions, celery and carrot simmered in veal stock, puréed, thickened with ground almonds and enriched with double cream.) and fricassée of sweetbread for Jane Austen, asparagus soup à la comtesse, and fillets of sole with ravigote sauce for Zola, brill Radziwill and boeuf à la mode for Proust, and for Dumas, who published a book about food, (Note: Dumas's Grand Dictionnaire de cuisine (1873), his last book, runs to some 750,000 words, and includes numerous recipes from Brillat-Savarin and other earlier writers.) she prints his own recipes for cabbage soup, scrambled eggs with shrimps, and several others.

Although Grigson's favourite of her works was the 1982 fruit book, she said she had a particular fondness for Food With the Famous.

=== 1980s ===
==== The Observer French Cookery School (1980) ====
This book was a spin-off from an Observer series. Its two authors, Grigson and Anne Willan of La Varenne cookery school in Paris, augmented their Observer articles for the book. Willan's sections, occupying the majority of the 300 pages, give technical advice on various aspects of cooking, such as boning, making choux pastry, the use of gelatine, and cooking with bains-marie. A 1991 bibliography describes Grigson's section—a 47-page "Anthology of French cooking and kitchen terms"—as "an alphabetic listing of descriptions written in condensed but detailed prose, full of personal observation; almost a little book in itself".

==== Jane Grigson's Fruit Book (1982) ====
For Grigson, this book was more fun to write than any of her others. Her particular fondness for fruits caused her to protest in her introduction about the quality offered by large suppliers:

The food trade makes the egalitarian mistake, which is also a convenience for itself, of thinking that every food has to be as cheap and inoffensive as every other similar food. This mistake has ruined chicken and potatoes and bread. No wine merchant sells only plonk, no flower shop sticks to daisies. In the matter of vegetables and fruit, we seem often to be reduced to a steady bottom of horticultural plonk.

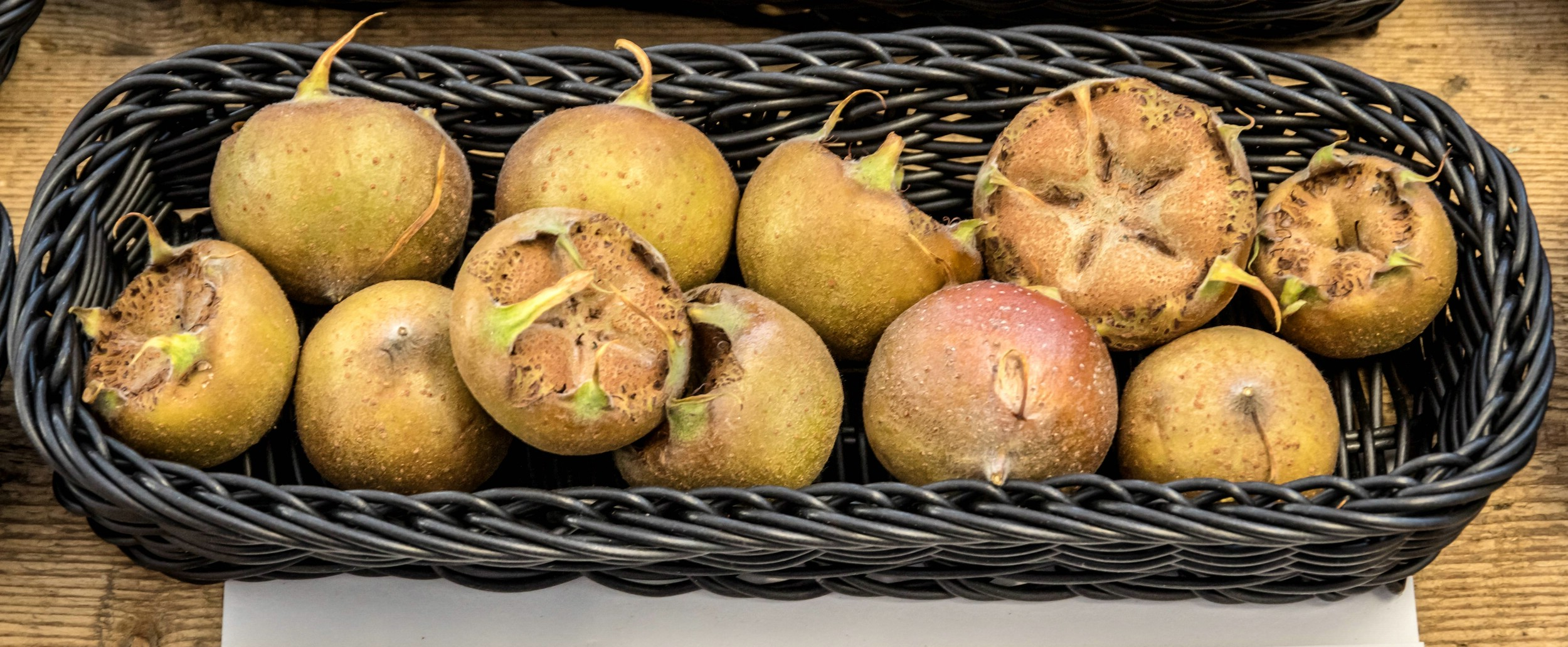
Medlars

The layout follows that of the vegetable book of three years earlier: chapters on each fruit, set out alphabetically from apples to water-melon. In between, familiar fruits such as bananas, cherries, pears and strawberries are interspersed with cherimoyas, medlars, persimmons and sapodillas. There are 46 of these chapters, taking 432 pages. The book finishes with a miscellany of fruit-related topics, such as matching fruits and wines, fruit preserves, and recipes for biscuits suitable to eat with fruit.

As well as recipes in which the fruit is the star ingredient, Grigson gives details of many dishes where fruit is combined with meat, poultry or fish, including pheasant with apples, lamb with apricots, sole with banana, quail with cherries, oxtail with grapes, and eel soup with pears. As in the vegetable book, Grigson is clear about her likes and dislikes. "Rhubarb: Nanny-food. Governess-food. School-meal-food." She finds some recipes for it worth including, but falls short of calling them delectable—"merely not too undelectable".

Reviewing the book in Petits Propos Culinaires, Jane Davidson called it "brilliant", adding, "Anecdotes, history, poetry and personal appreciation are all here as well as practical suggestions on how to use both the familiar and less so. ... In Michelin language, four stars and six place settings". (Note: The Michelin restaurant guides award a maximum of three stars ("Exceptional cuisine, worth a special journey") and five place settings (for the most luxurious establishments).) Like the Vegetable Book, this one won Grigson a Glenfiddich and an André Simon award.

==== The Observer Guide to European Cookery (1983) ====
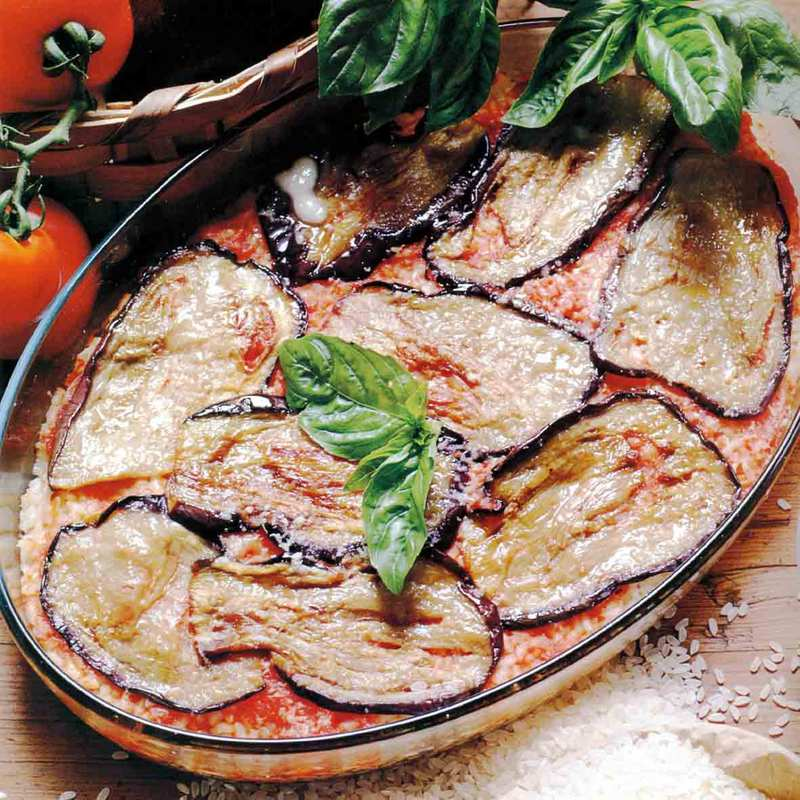
Parmigiana di melanzane

Grigson published The Observer Guide to European Cookery in 1983. She expanded her original articles from The Observer into this 256-page book, extensively illustrated by uncredited Observer photographers. A reviewer commented that one might expect the author, her life based partly in France, to begin with French cuisine, but Grigson explains:

Greece comes first, with classical and Hellenic chefs already theorising about food in terms that do not seem odd today. In terms that make perfect sense. Italy took on the skills of Greece, since well-off Romans employed chefs from Athens just as well-off Northerners have looked to Paris for their chefs. Through Spain, Arab dishes and Arab gardening, as well as new vegetables and foods from America, were handed on to the rest of Europe. Portugal comes in here, in its great phase of travel and discovery. France next, in the perfect, unique position between Mediterranean and Atlantic seas, exactly poised to take advantage of the Renaissance and the New World.

In each chapter Grigson mixes the well known and the offbeat. In the opening Greek chapter, recipes for taramasalata, moussaka and dolmades sit alongside hare in walnut sauce and salad of calf brains. Italian recipes include classics such as osso buco with risotto milanese, Parmigiana di melanzane and vitello tonnato, but also grilled eel, sole with Parmesan, tripe with pig's trotters, and lamb sautéed with olives. Similar juxtapositions are found in other chapters—Portuguese cuisine beyond sardines, British beyond steak and kidney pudding, and Scandinavian beyond smörgåsbord. Among the less well-known dishes described by Grigson are beef fillet with gentleman's sauce, (Note: The sauce—sugo signore—is made of caramelised milk and cream.) chicken in a dressing-gown, (Note: The dressing-gown is the Viennese term for an egg-and-breadcrumb coating.) chilled grape soup, quaking pudding, red wine soup, and Siberian ravioli.

In the US the book was published in 1983 by Atheneum, under the title Jane Grigson's Book of European Cookery.

==== The Observer Guide to British Cookery (1984) ====
This 231-page book is similar in layout and approach to the previous year's guide to European cooking, but unlike its predecessor it was published in book form before recipes from it were extracted and printed by the newspaper. The British regions are considered in nine sections, each with an introduction describing the character and ingredients, followed by recipes associated with places within the region.

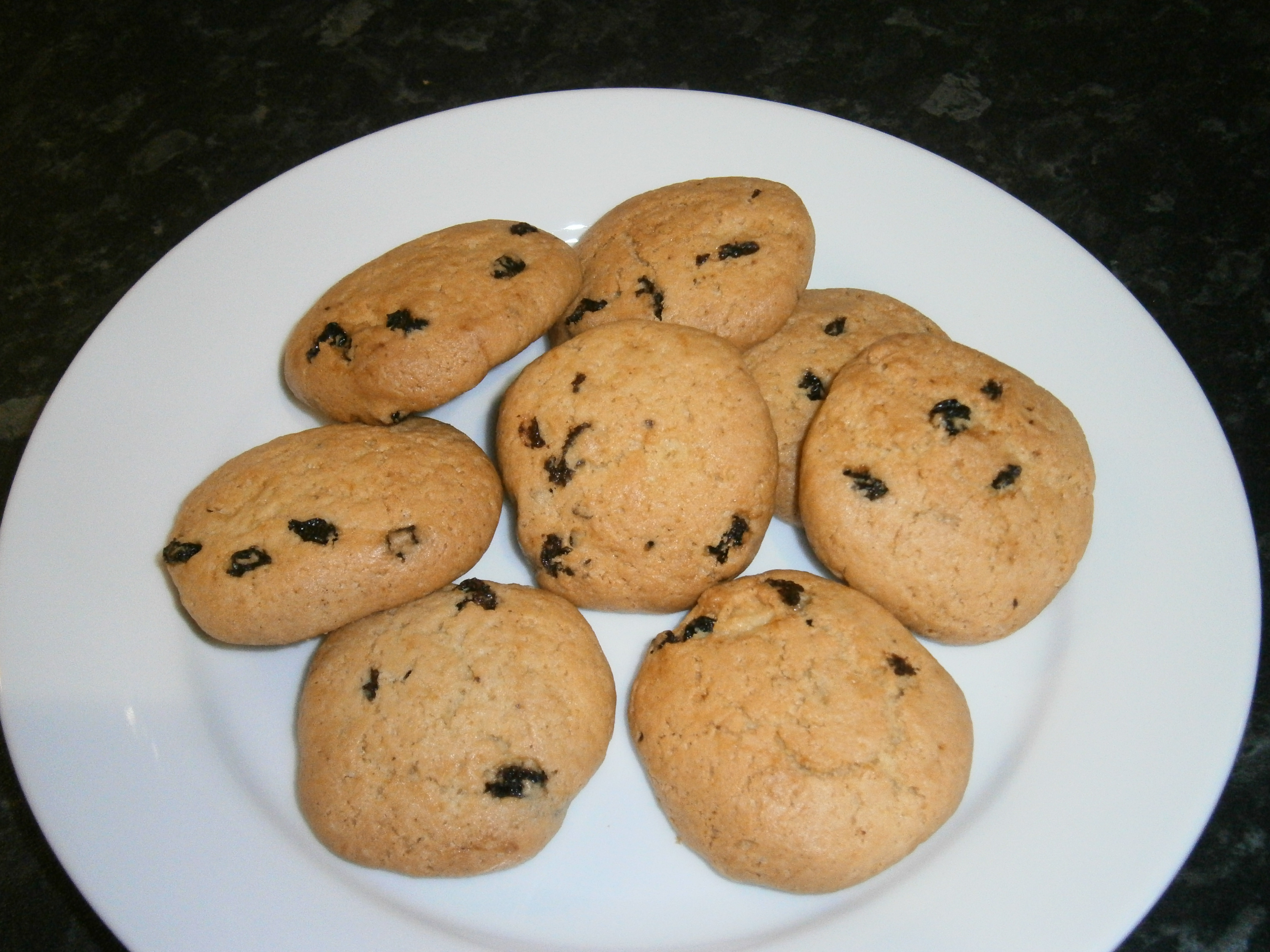
Shrewsbury cakes

The South-West chapter includes Cornish bouillabaisse from Gidleigh Park; Sedgemoor eel stew; lardy cake; and "Cornwall's most famous and most travestied dish", the Cornish pasty—"pronounced with a long 'ah' as in Amen". Among the dishes in the London and the South section are steak and kidney pudding, using beef rump steak and lambs' kidneys; salt beef; and bread and butter pudding. Dishes from the Midlands include rabbit and pig tail stew; Oldbury gooseberry pies; Bakewell pudding; and Shrewsbury cakes. The East Anglia section includes turnip pie; stuffed guinea fowl; Lincolnshire plum bread; and, for its connection with Trinity College, Cambridge, crème brûlée.

In the North East chapter Grigson includes recipes for mutton and leek broth, mussel or oyster pudding and toad in the hole. Dishes from the North West include potted shrimps, Lancashire hotpot, Liverpool's scouse, Cumberland sausage and the chicken dish Hindle Wakes. Throughout the book Grigson includes lesser-known dishes alongside famous classics. The chapter on Scotland has recipes for Scotch broth, Haggis, Atholl brose and shortbread alongside Scotch woodcock and the sheep's head broth Powsowdie. Among the Welsh dishes, cawl and Welsh rabbit (Note: Like Elizabeth David and The Oxford Companion to Food, Grigson had no time for the neologism "rarebit".) are joined by caveach (pickled mackerel) and Lady Lanover's salt duck. In the final chapter, Ireland, Irish stew and soda bread are included alongside nettle soup and boxty (potato pancakes).

Each chapter concludes with a section contributed by Derek Cooper on "Regional drink". For the English regions and Wales the drinks are mostly beers and ciders, with some wines in the south. Sloe gin is included for Cumbria as are whisky for Scotland and whiskey and stout for Ireland.

==== Exotic Fruits and Vegetables (1986) ====
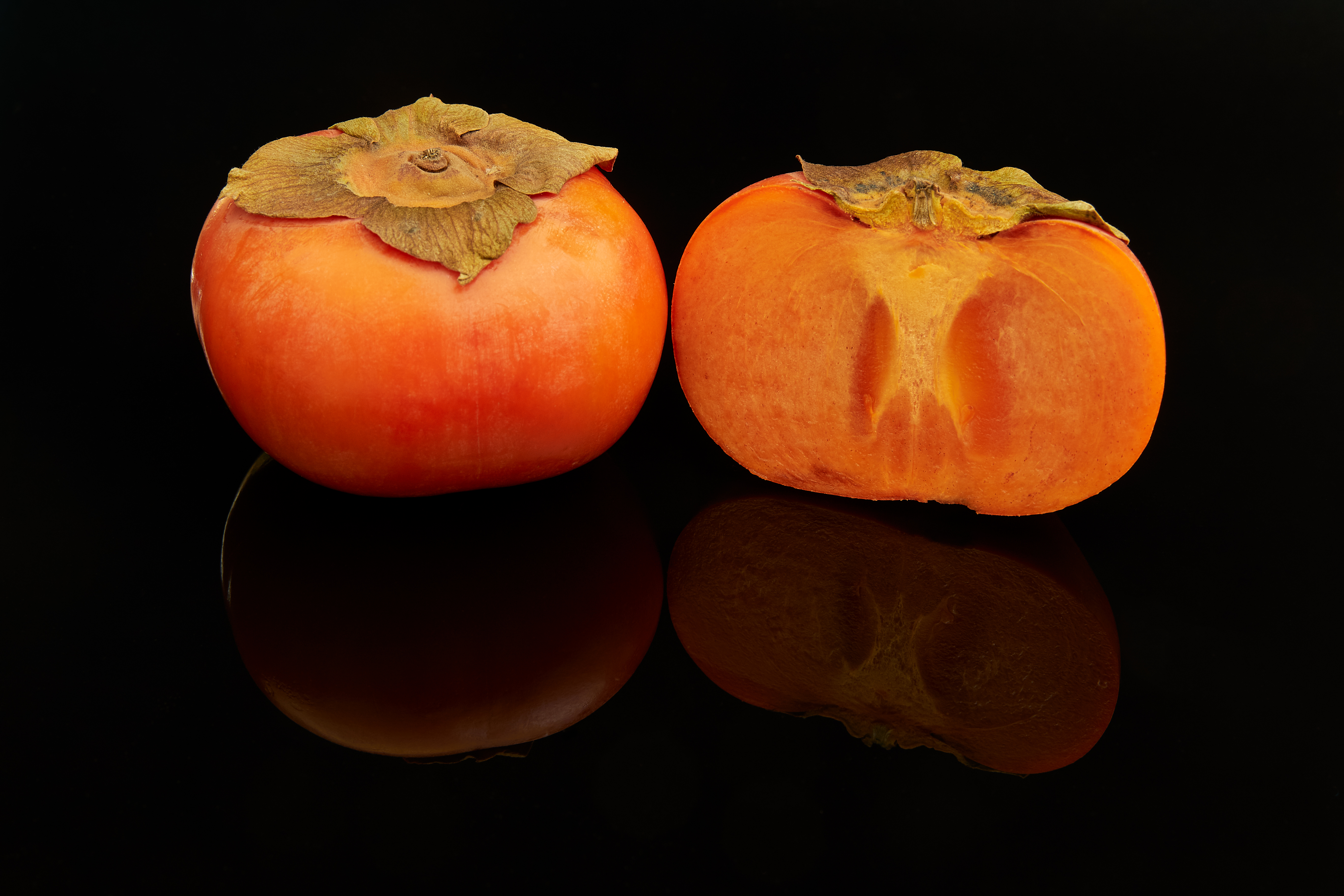
Persimmons

The illustrations play a particularly large part in this book, and the artist, Charlotte Knox, is given equal billing on the covers of both the British and the American editions. The book is described by its publisher as "An illustrated guide to fruits and vegetables from the world's hotter climates." Grigson added notes on the choice, preparation, and culinary use of each fruit or vegetable, and recipes using them. These include mango and carambola salad, mango and paw paw tart, persimmon fudge, and grey mullet with pomegranate sauce in the fruit chapters, and in the vegetable sections, plantain and chicken, snake gourd Malay style, drumstick curry with prawns, and yam and goat meat pottage. The book concludes with sections on 14 herbs and spices, from banana leaf to turmeric.

A US edition (1987) was published by Henry Holt as Cooking With Exotic Fruits and Vegetables.

=== Short books and booklets ===
==== Cooking Carrots (1975) and Cooking Spinach (1976) ====
These two booklets, of 36 pages each, were written for Abson Books, Bristol. They follow the same pattern: brief guidance on choosing, buying and preparing the vegetable, followed by 37 recipes apiece. Both books conclude with advice on growing the vegetable. The spinach book was originally sold with a packet of seeds attached to the cover.

==== The Year of the French (1982) ====
This booklet (16 pages) containing six recipes by Grigson, originally published in The Radio Times, was issued to accompany the BBC Television series of the same name, "A calendar of French life in 12 film portraits". Each section of the booklet has a one or two-page introduction by Grigson relating the recipe to a representative French person shown in the series, from the driver of a TGV to the octogenarian head of a beaujolais wine-growers collective.

==== Dishes from the Mediterranean (1984) ====
This publication is a slim (96-page) hardback, with numerous coloured photographs and line drawings of dishes. It was published by Woodhead-Faulkner for the supermarket chain J. Sainsbury. A new and enlarged edition was published in paperback the following year; it was reissued in 1991 with the title The Cooking of the Mediterranean.

The book contains chapters on Mediterranean ingredients; sauces and relishes; soups; first courses and meze dishes; fish; meat, poultry and game; rice and bread; and sweet dishes. In addition to descriptions and some historical notes, Grigson includes practical advice such as, for preparing fegato alla veneziana, "Half-freeze the liver so that it is solid enough to cut into thin, tissue-paper slivers". and for a chicken casserole with fifty cloves of garlic (poulet aux cinquante gousses d'ail) reassurance about the number of garlic cloves: "the purée they make is delicious and unidentifiable".

==== The Cooking of Normandy (1987) ====
This book, published for Sainsbury's, follows the pattern of the earlier Mediterranean publication. It is a 96-page, extensively illustrated addition to the "Sainsbury Cookbook" series. Line drawings by Mandy Doyle show details of some of the techniques described in the text. The sections cover ingredients and specialities; soups and first courses; fish and shellfish; meat, poultry and game; and desserts and drinks, with a short epilogue. In her introduction Grigson writes, "For me, Normandy cooking is a return to good, basic home dishes, with the added pleasure of tracking down ingredients of the highest quality." Although the book was published for and sold by a supermarket chain, Grigson's recipes include dishes for which such stores would not be expected to stock key ingredients, such as saddle of rabbit (she suggests using chicken if rabbit is not available) for lapin à la moutarde and sorrel for fricandeau à la oseille (mentioning spinach as a substitute if necessary).

=== Contributions to books by others ===
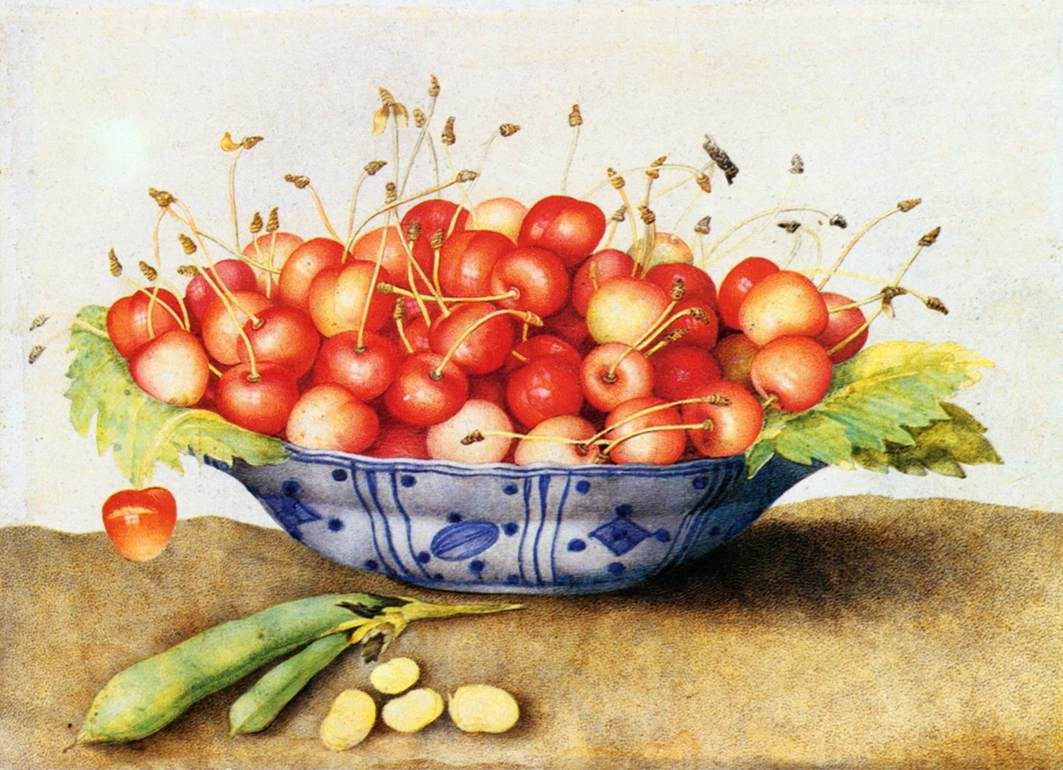
Chinese Porcelain Plate with Cherries: one of Giovanna Garzoni's 17th-century paintings on which Grigson comments in The Fruit, Herbs and Vegetables of Italy

A bibliography published in Petis Propos Culinaires in 1991 lists substantial contributions by Grigson to books by other writers: the introduction to The Book of Ingredients by Aidan Bailey, Elizabeth Lambert Ortiz and Helena Radecke; (Note: London, Michael Joseph, 1980. OCLC 930864914) one of five introductory essays in The Shell Guide to France, in which she offers guidance on food shops in France—poissonerie, pâtisserie, supermarché etc.—and how to shop in them; (Note: London, Michael Joseph, 1986. OCLC 0718122550) and a foreword, of about 1600 words, to The French Cheese Book by Patrick Rance. (Note: London, Macmillan, 1989. OCLC 476157241.)

In her foreword to Gillian Riley's new translation of Giacomo Castelvetro's 1614 book The Fruit, Herbs and Vegetables of Italy Grigson describes her acquaintance with Castelvetro's work and with the paintings of Giovanna Garzoni which figure largely in the illustrations to the new edition. (Note: London, Penguin Viking, 1989. OCLC 477139224)

WorldCat lists introductions by Grigson to five other books: The Elle Cookbook (later republished as The Art of French Cuisine); (Note: London, Michael Joseph, 1981. OCLC 485473060) the British edition of The Chez Panisse Menu Cookbook by Alice Waters; (Note: London, Chatto and Windus, 1984. OCLC 12474109) Francis Bissell's A Cook's Calendar; (Note: London, Chatto and Windus, 1985. OCLC 12501640) A Definitive Catalogue of Toiletries and Comestibles by Tessa Traeger and Mimi Errington; (Note: London, Crabtree & Evelyn, 1986. OCLC 1043087256) and a new edition of Geoffrey Grigson's The Englishman's Flora. (Note: London, Folio Society, 1987. OCLC 50396110)

=== Posthumously-published anthologies ===
==== The Enjoyment of Food: The Best of Jane Grigson (1992) ====
This 464-page anthology of recipes from Grigson's books was compiled by Roy Fullick and published by Michael Joseph. In a preface Fullick writes that it is intended "both as a tribute to Jane Grigson's culinary skills and scholarship and as a practical cookery book".

The book has an introduction by Elizabeth David, recalling her friendship with Grigson and reminding readers that although it was now taken for granted that Grigson was a classic cookery writer, she had burst on the culinary scene in the late 1960s when "the clarity of the writing, and the confident knowledge ... displayed by this young author were new treats for all of us". David comments that "this varied yet balanced compilation" would remind readers what a loss the cookery world had sustained by Grigson's premature death and inspire them to acquire more of Grigson's works. "Hers are books which can be read in the comfort of one's sitting room as well as used in the kitchen".

The main text is in eight sections, with the titles "At home in England"; "At home in France"; "Charcuterie", "The Mediterranean", "The Europeans", "The Americas", "India and the Far East" and "Treats and celebrations". There are recipes from writers of the past such as Eliza Acton, Hannah Glasse, Maria Rundell and Auguste Escoffier, and contemporaries including Elizabeth David, Richard Olney, Julia Child, Alice Waters, Antonio Carluccio and Grigson's daughter Sophie. The recipes are interspersed with Grigson's customary historical background information: there are appearances by Lord Byron, Chaucer, Casanova, Louis XIV, and Evelyn, Sydney Smith and others from Food with the Famous.

The book was reissued in 2015 as The Best of Jane Grigson: The Enjoyment of Food by Grub Street publishers, to commemorate the 25th anniversary of Grigson's death.

==== Jane Grigson's Desserts (1993) ====
This is one of two books of Grigson recipes published simultaneously by Michael Joseph. It is a 92-page hardback, in a small-page format of 12 cm × 15 cm (5 in × 6 in). It is illustrated throughout with line drawings and contains 50 dessert recipes, all taken from previously published Grigson books. Included are some old recipes such as Robert Southey's gooseberry pie and Elizabeth Raffald's orange custards, and many from overseas (redcurrant tart from Austria, strawberry fritters from France, and sweet pumpkin from Turkey) as well as British favourites like summer pudding.

==== Jane Grigson's Soups (1993) ====
Uniform with the preceding volume, the book contains 50 recipes from earlier books by Grigson. Well-known classic soups such as bouillabaisse, gazpacho and cock-a-leekie are interspersed with more unusual recipes including apricot and apple, red onion and wine, and cucumber and sorrel.

==== Puddings (1996) ====
This is a 64-page paperback, in a small format (approximately A6) issued one of the "Penguin 60s series" of miniature books along with, among others, Elizabeth David's Peperonata and Other Italian Dishes, and a collection of Sophie Grigson's recipes, From Sophie's Table. Like the 1993 desserts collection, above, it reused material from previously published books by Grigson.

== Style, reputation and legacy ==
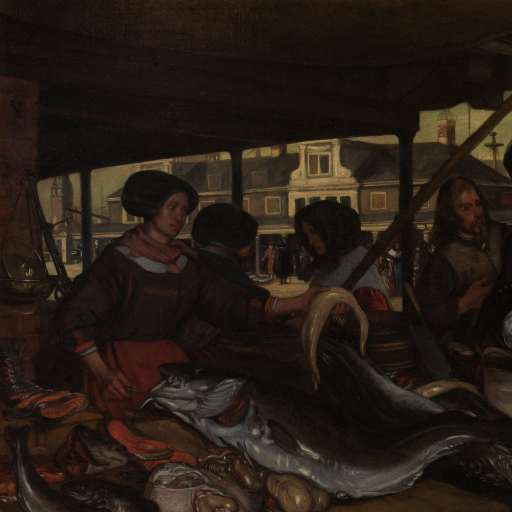
De Nieuwe Vismarkt te Amsterdam, by Emanuel de Witte; a section of the painting was depicted on the cover of the Penguin edition of Fish Cookery (1994)

=== Style ===
Along with Elizabeth David, Grigson is widely credited with transforming the British cookery book into something more than a collection of recipes. Like David's, Grigson's writing offered not only lists of ingredients and instructions for preparation and cooking, but also interesting historical and social background. The obituaries were warm and full of praise for Grigson's style and wide appeal. In The Independent, Alan Davidson wrote:

She won to herself this wide audience because she was above all a friendly writer, equipped by both frame of mind and style of writing to communicate easily with them.

However much more she knew about this or that than do the rest of us, she never seemed to be talking down to anyone. On the contrary, she is a most companionable presence in the kitchen; often catching the imagination with a deftly chosen fragment of history or poetry, but never failing to explain the why as well as the how of cookery. How often have I heard people declare that her recipes are not just a pleasure to read—they always work!

Sophie Grigson writes that her mother "thought food was the key to unlocking life"; in the introduction to Good Things, Jane stated:

Cooking something delicious is really more satisfactory than painting pictures or throwing pots. ... Food has the tact to disappear, leaving the room and opportunity for masterpieces to come. The mistakes don’t hang on the walls or stand on the shelves to reproach you for ever.

In Elizabeth David's view, Grigson's books have a "clarity of the writing, and the confident knowledge of its subject and its history". The sociologist Stephen Mennell believes that Grigson's writing, like David's, should be considered "gastronomic literature", rather than cookery book writing, and therefore read as literature; the cultural sociologists Bob Ashley, Joanne Hollows, Steve Jones and Ben Taylor consider that because of the "considerable erudition" in her work, Grigson's books can be read as "culinary, historical literature", rather than cookery books. Geraldene Holt, who thinks Grigson's prose is both lyrical and robust, describes Grigson's writing style as:

forthright yet entertaining, in a similar vein to that of her eminent forebears who include Morton Shand, Edward Bunyard, Lady Jekyll and Elizabeth David. Jane Grigson's essays are, however, memorably enlivened by relevant information and quotations from a remarkably wide range of sources—poets, novelists, gardeners, earlier food writers and cookery manuals.

According to the writers Hazel Castell and Kathleen Griffin, Grigson tried to show food within its historical, social and cultural context, which was "at the very heart of life, so it was natural that literature, history and poetry should be included alongside recipes". The journalist Deirdre McQuillan considers that the scholarly references are "always there to delight, and never to impress". Rayner sees in her writing a "lightness of touch" with her use of scholarly material. Christopher Driver writes:

Grigson's range was wider than Elizabeth David's, for it extended from fish and fungi to the exotic fruits and vegetables that arrived on the international market in the eighties. She would have been the first to acknowledge that Elizabeth's culinary scholarship was deeper and her precision superior: one of the little-noticed reasons for Mrs David's dominance of her audience in the 1950s was her miraculous sense of lucid detail while Mrs Grigson in the 1970s and 1980s could allow herself in print an element of careless rapture, depending on the commonsense of advanced cooks by then men as well as women.

The literary historian Nicola Humble observes that because of the way Grigson used the historical and literary sources in a more relaxed way, her writing was "less haughty" that David's could be.

=== Legacy and reputation ===
In 1991 the Jane Grigson Trust was set up in Grigson's memory. Its stated aim is "to advance the public understanding of food, its cultural and nutritional aspects, and the art of its preparation." The trust funds the annual Jane Grigson Lecture at the Oxford Symposium on Food and Cookery every July. In 2015, to commemorate the 25th anniversary of her death, the Jane Grigson Trust Award was inaugurated, for the writer of a commissioned first non-fiction book on the subject of food.

It was proposed soon after Grigson's death that a library of books about food and cooking should be set up in her honour, under the Jane Grigson Trust. Sophie Grigson made the core of her mother's personal collection of food books available on permanent loan. The Jane Grigson Library, inaugurated in 1992, was originally housed at the Guildhall Library in the City of London. By 2005, augmented by donations and bequests, the library had doubled its original size, to more than 4,000 volumes. It was rehoused at Oxford Brookes University in 2005. The library is available for use by scholars, researchers or members of the public. In March 2015 the university held a month-long exhibition, Jane Grigson: Good Things, to examine her life and work.

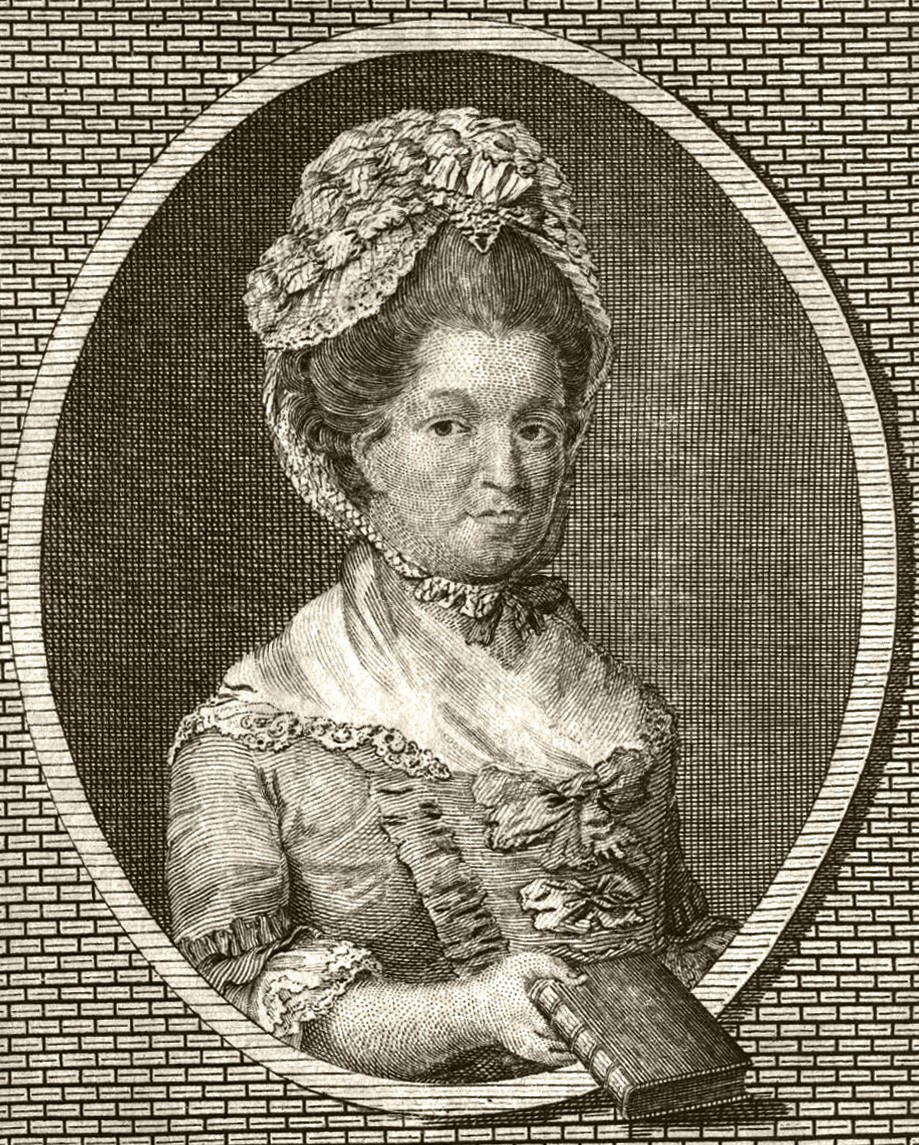
Elizabeth Raffald, one of the food writers Grigson wrote about in English Food

In 1992 the International Association of Culinary Professionals introduced the Jane Grigson Award, to honour "a book that exemplifies Jane Grigson's extraordinary ability to put food in a wider cultural context, using diligent but not pedantic scholarship". The first winner was the Canadian writer Margaret Visser, for her work The Rituals of Dinner. Other winners include, in 1995, Elizabeth David and Jill Norman, Harvest of the Cold Months: The Social History of Ice and Ices (Note: The award was posthumous for David; she died in May 1992.) and, in 2014, Jancis Robinson, Julia Harding and Jose Vouillamoz, for Wine Grapes.

In 2015, on the 25th anniversary of her death, The Food Programme broadcast a two-part special on Grigson and her impact on the culture of British food.

Humble considers that Grigson's work turned the minds of the British public to Industrial Revolution British food cooked by Hannah Glasse, Elizabeth Raffald, Maria Rundell and Eliza Acton; this, Humble states, had "a transformative effect on ... [British] eating habits". She writes that the reason for the effect is that Grigson's writing is reader-friendly and English Food made many dishes fashionable again. The chef Shaun Hill believes Grigson's "legacy is ongoing—it's not finished yet"; he considers that even though much of her work was written 40 years ago, it is still relevant to modern readers. The food writer Diana Henry said of Grigson:

Jane Grigson exemplifies what a food writer should be. She is cerebral and practical—it's hard to find practitioners who are both—and she is inclusive. She didn't just want to tell you about cooking and impart knowledge, she wanted you to cook too. She was neither grand nor snobbish. You knew that if you ever got the chance to cook for her she wouldn't mind if you produced something less than perfect.

== Notes, references and sources ==
=== Sources ===
==== Cited books by Jane Grigson ====
- Charcuterie and French Pork Cookery. London: Grub Street. 2001 [1967]. ISBN 978-1-902304-88-5.
- Good Things. London: Grub Street. 2007 [1971]. ISBN 978-1-904943-87-7.
- Fish Cookery. London: Penguin. 1975 [1973]. ISBN 978-0-14-046216-6.
- English Food. London: Penguin. 1993 [1974]. ISBN 978-0-1410-4586-3.
- The World Atlas of Food. London: Mitchell Beazley. 1974. ISBN 978-0-600-55929-0.
- The Mushroom Feast. London: Penguin. 1981 [1975]. ISBN 978-0-14-046273-9.
- Jane Grigson's Vegetable Book. London: Michael Joseph. 1978. ISBN 978-0-7181-1675-0.
- Jane Grigson's Vegetable Book. New York: Atheneum. 1979a. ISBN 978-0-689-10994-2.
- Food With the Famous. London: Michael Joseph. 1979b. ISBN 978-0-7181-1855-6.
- Jane Grigson's Fruit Book. London: Michael Joseph. 1982. ISBN 978-0-7181-2125-9.
- The Observer Guide to European Cookery. London: Michael Joseph. 1983. ISBN 978-0-7181-2233-1.
- The Observer Guide to British Cookery. London: Michael Joseph. 1984. ISBN 978-0-7181-2446-5.
- Dishes from the Mediterranean. Cambridge: Woodhead-Faulkner for J. Sainsbury. 1985 [1984]. OCLC 57356361.
- Exotic Fruits and Vegetables. London: Jonathan Cape. 1986. ISBN 978-0-224-02138-8.
- The Cooking of Normandy. London: Martin Books for J. Sainsbury. 1987a. ISBN 978-0-85941-486-9.
- The Enjoyment of Food: The Best of Jane Grigson. London: Michael Joseph. 2015 [1992]. ISBN 978-1-909808-28-7.
- Jane Grigson's Desserts. London: Michael Joseph. 1993a. ISBN 978-0-7181-0043-8.
- Jane Grigson's Soups. London: Michael Joseph. 1993b. ISBN 978-0-7181-0042-1.
- Puddings. London: Penguin. 1996. ISBN 978-0-14-095348-0.
- Grigson, Geoffrey; —— (1967). Shapes and Adventures. London: Marshbank. OCLC 853999592.

==== Other cited books ====
- Abbott, Mary (2003). Family Affairs: A History of the Family in Twentieth-Century England. London: Routledge. ISBN 978-1-134-75870-8.
- Allen, Darina (2015). "(Re)creating the Irish Farmers Market". In McWilliams, Mark (ed.). Food & Markets: Proceedings of the Oxford Symposium on Food and Cookery 2014. London: Prospect Books. pp. 11–14. ISBN 978-1-909248-44-1.
- Ashley, Bob; Hollows, Joanne; Jones, Steve; Taylor, Ben (2004). Food and Cultural Studies. London: Routledge. ISBN 978-0-415-27039-7.
- Avila, Kay (1986). Take Twelve Cooks. London: Macdonald and Co. ISBN 978-0-356-12287-8.
- Castell, Hazel; Griffin, Kathleen (1993). Out of the Frying Pan. London: BBC Books. ISBN 978-0-5633-6481-8.
- David, Elizabeth (2008) [1960]. French Provincial Cooking. London: Folio Society. OCLC 678011986.
- David, Elizabeth (1986) [1984]. An Omelette and a Glass of Wine. London: Penguin. ISBN 978-0-14-046721-5.
- Davidson, Alan, ed. (1999). The Oxford Companion to Food. Oxford: Oxford University Press. ISBN 978-0-19-211579-9.
- Davidson, Jane (2002). "Jane Grigson's Fruit Book". In Davidson, Alan; Saberi, Helen (eds.). The Wilder Shores of Gastronomy: Twenty Years of the Best Food Writing From the Journal Petits Propos Culinaires. Berkeley, CA: Ten Speed Press. pp. 331–332. ISBN 978-1-5800-8417-8.
- Garin, Gilbert, ed. (2019). Le Guide Michelin: France. Paris: Michelin Editions des Voyages. ISBN 978-2-06-723336-2.
- Grigson, Geoffrey (1970). Notes From an Odd Country. London: Macmillan. OCLC 872653086.
- Healey, R. M. (2002). "'The Lunatic House of the BBC': Grigson as Broadcaster". In Barfoot, C. C.; Healey, R. M. (eds.). My Rebellious and Imperfect Eye, Observing Geoffrey Grigson. Amsterdam and New York: Rodopi. p. 174. ISBN 90-420-1358-3.
- Humble, Nicola (2006). Culinary Pleasures: Cook Books and the Transformation of British Food. London: Faber & Faber. ISBN 978-0-5712-2871-3.
- Mennell, Stephen (1996). All Manners of Food: Eating and Taste in England and France from the Middle Ages to the Present (Second ed.). Urbana and Chicago, IL: University of Illinois Press. ISBN 978-0-252-06490-6.

==== Internet ====
- "About Jane". Jane Grigson Trust.
- "About the Trust". Jane Grigson Trust.
- "About us". Oxford Food Symposium.
- "The Art of Charcuterie". WorldCat.
- "The Art of Making Sausages, Pâtes, and Other Charcuterie". WorldCat.
- "BBC Radio 4 – Desert Island Discs, Jane Grigson". BBC.
- "Cookbook Awards". The International Association of Culinary Professionals. Archived from the original on 19 July 2019.
- "Exotic Fruits and Vegetables". WorldCat.
- "English Food". Jane Grigson Trust.
- "English Food". WorldCat.
- "The Experienced English Housekeeper". BBC Genome. BBC. Archived from the original on 28 June 2019.
- "The Food Programme, Jane Grigson – A Tribute: Part One". BBC.
- "The Food Programme, Jane Grigson – A Tribute: Part Two". BBC.
- "Food With the Famous". Kirkus Reviews. 17 March 1980.
- Forbes, Paula (15 March 2014). "IACP Announces 2014 Food Writing Award Winners". Eater.
- "The Glass Tank at Oxford Brookes will open its next exhibition titled 'Jane Grigson: Good Things'". Oxford Brookes University. 25 February 2015. Archived from the original on 10 August 2020.
- "Good Things". The Folio Society. Archived from the original on 21 June 2019.
- "Grigson Fish Cookery". WorldCat.
- "Heather M J McIntire", England & Wales, Civil Registration Marriage Index, vol. 23, General Register Office, p. 1489, 1976 – via Ancestry (subscription required)
- "Heroes". BBC Genome. BBC. Archived from the original on 28 June 2019.
- "Industry flexes mussel on culinary myth". Fisheries Research and Development Corporation.
- "The International Wine and Food Society's guide to fish cookery". WorldCat.
- "Jane Grigson". WorldCat.
- "Jane Grigson Collection". Oxford Brookes University.
- "Jane Grigson's Fruit Book". Penguin.
- "Jane Grigson (Radio)". BBC Genome. BBC. Archived from the original on 7 August 2020.
- "Jane Grigson (Television)". BBC Genome. BBC. Archived from the original on 7 August 2020.
- "Jane Grigson's Fish Book". WorldCat.
- "The Lecture". Jane Grigson Trust. Archived from the original on 10 May 2019.
- "The Library". Jane Grigson Trust.
- "A Matter of Taste". BBC Genome. BBC. Archived from the original on 28 June 2019.
- "The Mushroom Feast". Kirkus Reviews. 1 August 1975.
- "Translation Prizes: The Society of Authors". The Society of Authors. Archived from the original on 26 June 2022.
- "trip-madam". Oxford English Dictionary (online ed.). Oxford University Press. (Subscription or participating institution membership required.)
- "Worst, paté, en andere charcuterie uit de Franse keuken". WorldCat.

==== Journals and magazines ====
- Anderson, Digby (1 December 1984). "First paunch your rabbit". The Spectator. pp. 35–36.
- Cooper, Artemis (2017). "David [née Gwynne], Elizabeth (1913–1992)". Oxford Dictionary of National Biography (online ed.). Oxford University Press. doi:10.1093/ref:odnb/50960. (Subscription, Wikipedia Library access or UK public library membership required.)
- Davidson, Alan (1985). "Book reviews". Petits Propos Culinaires. 19. Prospect Books: 65–66.
- Davidson, Jane (1979). "Review". Petits Propos Culinaires. 1. Prospect Books: 71.
- "Grigson, Geoffrey Edward Harvey (1905–1985)". Oxford Dictionary of National Biography (online ed.). Oxford University Press. May 2009. doi:10.1093/ref:odnb/31176. (Subscription, Wikipedia Library access or UK public library membership required.) (subscription, Wikipedia Library access or UK public library membership required)
- "Grigson, (Heather Mabel) Jane". Who's Who. doi:10.1093/ww/9780199540884.013.U164831. (subscription required)
- "Grigson [née McIntire], (Heather Mabel) Jane". Oxford Dictionary of National Biography (online ed.). Oxford University Press. 2015. doi:10.1093/ref:odnb/39832. (Subscription, Wikipedia Library access or UK public library membership required.) (subscription, Wikipedia Library access or UK public library membership required)
- Grigson, Sophie (June 2019). "My Weekend Menu". Food. Waitrose & Partners. pp. 42–47.
- Holland, Isobel; Hunter, Lynette; Stoneham, Geraldine (1991). "Bibliography of Jane Grigson's Books". Petits Propos Culinaires. 38. Prospect Books: 20–49.
- Holt, Geraldene (July 2013). "Jane Grigson". Petits Propos Culinaires. 98. Prospect Books: 62–70.
- Jones, Steve; Taylor, Ben (1 May 2001). "Food writing and food cultures: The case of Elizabeth David and Jane Grigson" (PDF). European Journal of Cultural Studies. 4 (2): 171–188. doi:10.1177/136754940100400204.

==== Newspapers ====
- Ardron, Skeffington (7 November 1975). "Fungus Feast". The Guardian. p. 12.
- Baker, Roger (28 November 1974). "A stimulant to gluttony and the art of elegant eating". The Times. p. vii.
- Bateman, Michael (18 July 1993). "Jane Grigson's piscine revisions: After 20 years, a book on fish by one of Britain's greatest cookery writers is republished". The Independent on Sunday.
- Cloake, Felicity (9 July 2015). "Jane Grigson: the woman whose words you'll want to eat". The New Statesman.
- "Cookbook queen serves up a literary grand tour of European cuisine". South China Morning Post. 28 January 2018. p. 48.
- Cooke, Rachel (15 August 2010). "The 50 best cookbooks". The Observer Food Monthly.
- Cooke, Rachel (15 March 2015). "Jane Grigson: her life and legacy". The Observer.
- David, Elizabeth (18 March 1990). "A flavour of true goodness". The Observer. p. 51.
- Davidson, Alan (14 March 1990). "Obituary: Jane Grigson". The Independent. p. 11.
- Driver, Christopher (14 February 1986). "The dozen leaders in your choice of kitchen books you cannot do without". The Guardian. p. 20.
- Driver, Christopher (14 March 1990). "Feasting with educated greed". The Guardian. p. 39.
- "Ego Two". The Observer. 26 January 1969. p. 30.
- Ehrlich, Michael (19 September 1998). "Food and Drink". The Guardian. p. C65.
- Fabricant, Florence (7 March 1984). "Britain's Jane Grigson: A No-Nonsense Cook". The New York Times. p. C1.
- "For All Sorts of Children". The Times. 10 December 1964. p. 17.
- "French cookery winners". The Observer. 24 February 1980. p. 4.
- Galvin, Chris (12 September 2001). "Charcuterie and French Pork Cookery—Jane Grigson". The Caterer.
- "A Good Cook". The Observer. 6 May 1979. p. 13.
- Grigson, Jane (23 November 1987b). "In rival camps over Stone Age site". The Times. p. 15.
- Grigson, Sophie (17 February 2008). "Time and place: Sophie Grigson on the country farmhouse where she grew up". The Sunday Times.
- Grigson, Jane (17 September 1989). "Fighting cancer with food". The Observer. p. 40.
- Hazelton, Niki (12 December 1971). "Pleasing To the Palate". The New York Times. p. 30.
- Henry, Diana (12 March 2015). "Diana Henry: Jane Grigson exemplifies what a food writer should be". The Daily Telegraph.
- "In your 1982 Observer". The Observer. 3 January 1982. p. 1.
- "Jane Grigson". The Times. 14 March 1990. p. 18.
- "Jane Grigson wins awards". The Observer. 8 May 1983. p. 5.
- Leapman, Michael (18 July 1993). "Jane Grigson's piscine revisions: After 20 years, a book on fish by one of Britain's greatest cookery writers is republished". The Independent.
- Leith, Prue (3 December 1982). "Christmas Foodies". The Guardian. p. 11.
- Leith, Prue (4 November 1983). "Now even good cooks are allowed to look at the pictures". The Guardian. p. 2.
- Lewis, Naomi (22 November 1964). "Children's Books". The Observer. p. 28.
- Levy, Paul (18 March 1990). "Cook With the Recipe for Love". The Observer. p. 51.
- McDouall, Robin (24 November 1978). "Food". The Times. p. ix.
- McIntire, Jane (2 August 1951a). "Attraction of Fine Pottery". Sunderland Echo. p. 2.
- McIntire, Jane (27 November 1951b). "North-East Started Renaissance in Art and Learning". Sunderland Echo. p. 2.
- McIntire, Jane (20 February 1953). "Stanfield Delights a new Audience". Sunderland Echo. p. 9.
- McQuillan, Deirdre (17 March 1990). "A talent for revealing good things; Jane Grigson believed in preparing fine fare without fuss and was rarely at a loss to uncover poetry in the commonplace". The Independent. p. 37.
- Nosrat, Samin (28 June 2017). "The Classic Cookbooks That Shaped My Career as a Chef and Writer". The New York Times.
- "Paperback choice". The Observer. 4 June 1978. p. 29.
- "Paperbacks". The Times. 26 November 1970. p. 17.
- Pardoe, F. E. (28 November 1979). "Those you have drunk". Birmingham Daily Post. p. vi.
- "Peach, please: memorial". The Guardian. 29 June 1990. p. 39.
- Peacocke, Helen (19 March 2015). "Writer who changed our tastes in cuisine". The Oxford Times.
- Poole, Shona Crawford (16 July 1983). "Watching culinary alchemy at work". The Times. p. 5.
- Ray, Elizabeth (8 December 1974). "Booked cooks". The Observer. p. 30.
- Rayner, Jay (4 December 2016). "'Food writing was, as it has always been for The Observer, a celebration'". The Observer.
- Robertson, Bryan (16 March 1990). "Obituary: Jane Grigson". The Independent. p. 15.
- "Santa's Sackful". The Observer. 9 November 1980. p. 34.
- Sheraton, Mimi (25 November 1979). "Cooking". The New York Times. p. 4.
- Sheraton, Mimi (17 November 1982). "Assessing Three Diverse Cookbooks". The New York Times. p. C3.
- Slater, Nigel (31 October 1999). "20th century food and drink: Choice cuts". The Observer. p. 70.
- Spencer, Colin (17 March 1990). "Food & Drink: Jane Grigson". The Guardian. p. 22.
- Walker, Kathleen (3 June 1992). "Chateau Laurier to celebrate birthday with gala". The Ottawa Citizen. p. F2.
- Wilshaw, Harold (17 August 1973). "Eating by the book". The Guardian. p. 9.
- Wilshaw, Harold (25 April 1980). "Bumper browse". The Guardian. p. 8.
- "Winners of Julia Child Book Awards Announced". The Seattle Times. 12 April 1995. p. F11.

==== Radio ====
- The Food Programme: Jane Grigson – A Tribute: Part One (Radio). BBC Radio 4. 10 May 2015.
- The Food Programme: Jane Grigson – A Tribute: Part Two (Radio). BBC Radio 4. 11 May 2015.
- Grigson, Jane (8 July 1978). Desert Island Discs (Radio). BBC Radio 4.
