= Yvonne Skargon =

British wood engraver and watercolorist

- Born: 1 May 1931
- Died: 16 March 2010 (aged 78); Sundbury, UK
- Education: Colchester School of Art and the Royal College of Art
- Known for: Wood engraving
- Spouse: John Commander

Yvonne Skargon (1931-2010), was a British wood engraver, watercolorist, and typographer who was best known for her work related to botanical and culinary subjects.

== Career ==
Yvonne Skargon was born in 1931. She attended the Colchester School of Art and the Royal College of Art, London, and studied with Blair Hughes-Stanton and John O'Connor. She worked professionally as an illustrator of books about nature, gardening, and cooking, and regularly illustrated for the British horticultural journal, Hortus. Skargon was an instructor in wood engraving at the Royal College of Art for five years until the programme was ended in 1980. She illustrated dozens of books and wrote several on gardening that were printed in fine press editions. She illustrated three of Jane Grigson's books: The Mushroom Feast (1975), Jane Grigson's Vegetable Book (1978) and Jane Grigson's Fruit Book (1982).

Skargon also wrote and illustrated two books about her cats that achieved popular fame, The Importance of Being Oscar (1988) and Lily and Hodge and Dr. Johnson (1991), issued in fine press and trade editions by the publisher, Primrose Hill Press.

Skargon designed the commemorative issue of postage stamps to honour the 9th World Congress of Roses, Belfast, for the Royal Mail in 1991

Yvonne Skargon died on 16 March 2010.

== Known for ==
- Wijk, Olof. Eat at pleasure, drink by measure. (Constable, 1970)
- The Importance of Being Oscar (Primrose Hill, 1988)
- Lily and Hodge and Dr. Johnson (Primrose Hill, 1991)
- A Garden of My Own (Silent Books, 1996)
- A Concatenation (Primrose Hill, 1999)
- Watermarks : an anthology of rivers, seas and lakes with wood engravings (Primrose Hill, 2003)
