= Brown bread ice cream =

Flavour of ice cream

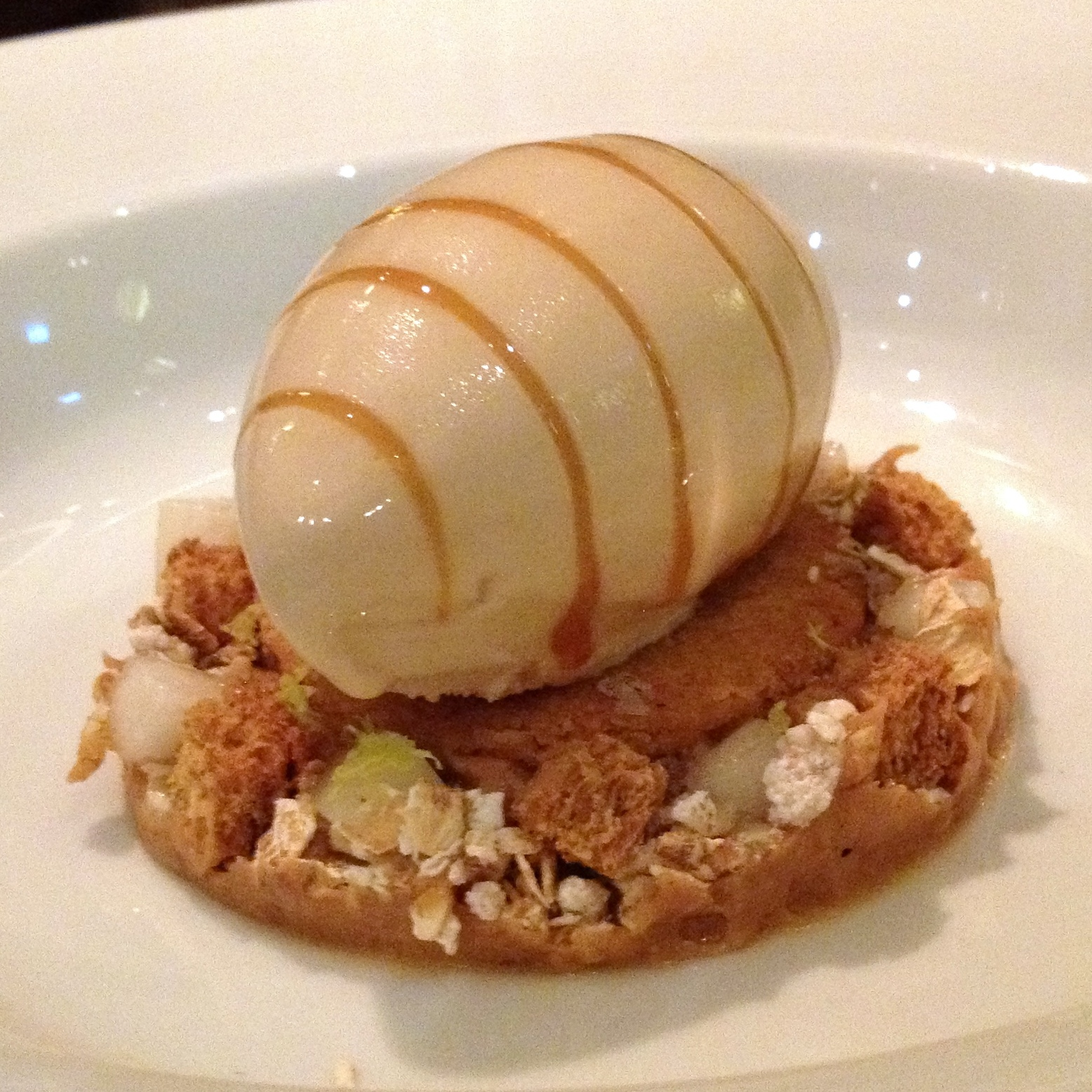
- Brown bread ice cream served at Dinner by Heston Blumenthal
- Type: Ice cream
- Place of origin: France
- Invented: Mid-18th century

Brown bread ice cream is a flavour of ice cream, made by adding toasted or caramelized brown bread to ice cream, or by infusing the flavour of brown bread then straining out the solids. The flavour emerged in 18th-century France, and became particularly popular during the 19th century in England.

== History ==
=== 18th century ===
The first recipes for brown bread ice cream date to 18th-century France. One early recipe was included in L’Art de Bien Faire les Glaces d’Office, the first book dedicated singularly to ice cream. Authored by a Monsieur Emy, it was published in 1768 in Paris. Emy's brown bread ice cream was completely smooth, made by steeping rye bread in sugar syrup, then filtering out the solids. In the years following, several ice cream makers printed recipes making brown bread ice cream using the same technique, likely in emulation. One of these was a Mr Borella, a confectioner working in London, who in 1770 published The Court and Country Confectioner or, the House- Keeper’s Guide. Borella's brown bread ice cream instructed cooks finely sift the bread crumbs, arguing the resulting ice cream would be "infinitely more agreeable to the mouth".

In the years that followed, all brown bread ice cream continued to filter out crumbs before moulding, producing a smooth, creamy ice cream. This changed in 1789 with the publication of The Complete Confectioner by Frederick Nutt. Nutt didn't soak the bread at all, instead adding before moulding:

Brown Bread Ice Cream.
Do the same with a pint of cream as in the plain ice cream, only when you have frozen it, rasp two handfuls of brown bread and put it in before you put it into your moulds.

=== 19th century onwards ===
Brown bread ice cream became particularly prominent during the 19th century; speculated by Elizabeth David to be due to the activities of Gunter's Tea Shop in Berkeley Square, London, who catered to the social events of the societal elite. Recipes continued to be printed: The Italian Confectioner in 1820 by Alfred Jarrin which cubed the bread and toasted it before adding to the mix, Gunter's in 1861 in their Modern Confectioner, and Agnes Marshall in 1888 in The Book of Ices, the last opting to soak the breadcrumbs. In the same period, the brown bread ice cream of the Winchester College shop was held in high regard.

Gunter's continued making brown bread ice cream into the 20th century. In the 1930s, David reflected, Gunter's "delivered it by the bucketful for outdoor parties". Thought the recipe faded from the 19th-century heights of popularity, David published a recipe in a magazine in the 1950s modifying a 1820s recipe, and by the 1970s the flavour was experiencing a revival, which Jane Grigson credited to the "excellent wholemeal bread now on sale in so many bakers’ shops". Grigson and David both gave recipes, each toasting their breadcrumbs, with Grigson suggesting the addition the rum. David issued several suggestions and warnings: do substitute in some pumpernickel or granary bread while using less sugar, do not add vanilla or add the breadcrumbs before freezing the cream mixture: the latter would produce "a rather pasty mass results". In a recipe published in the 1990s, this outcome was avoided without freezing the cream by first caramelizing the breadcrumbs in sugar. Several writers emphasize the appeal of the ice cream as the contrast between the smooth ice cream and crunchy bread.

== See also ==
- List of bread dishes
- List of ice cream flavors

== Sources ==
- David, Elizabeth (2001). Is There a Nutmeg in the House?. London: Penguin Books. ISBN 978-0-140-29290-9.
- Grigson, Jane (1974). English Food. Basingstoke, Hampshire and London: MacMillan London Ltd. ISBN 0333152131.
- Quinzio, Jeri (2009). Of Sugar and Snow: A History of Ice Cream Making. Berkeley, California and London: University of California Press. ISBN 978- 0- 520- 24861- 8.
- Whitley, Andrew (2009) [2006]. Bread Matters: The State of Modern Bread and a Definitive Guide to Baking Your Own. London: 4th Estate. ISBN 978-0-00-729849-5.
- Ysewijn, Regula (2015). Pride and Pudding: The History of British Puddings, Savoury and Sweet. Sydney and London: Murdoch Books. ISBN 978-1743367384.
