= Christ Church, Broad Town =

Christ Church
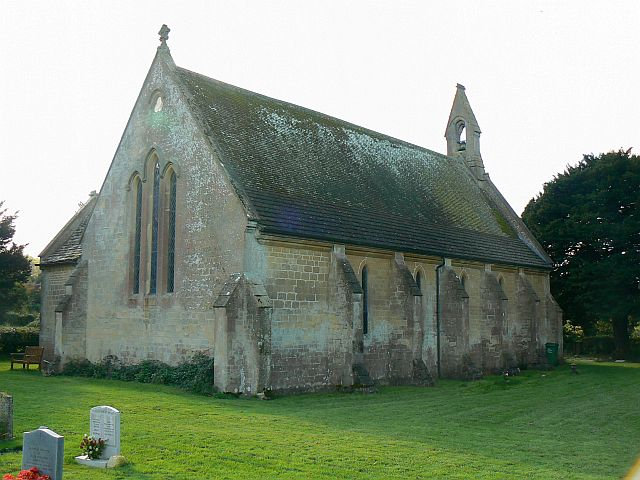
- "A handsome building"

- Location in Wiltshire
- 51.5027°N 1.8721°W
- OS grid reference: SU 08974 78200
- Location: Broad Town, Wiltshire
- Country: England
- Denomination: Church of England

History
- Founded: 1844

Architecture
- Heritage designation: Grade II
- Designated: 15 August 1985
- Architect: W. Hinton Campbell
- Style: "Late Commissioners' church"
- Completed: 1846

Administration
- Diocese: Diocese of Salisbury

Clergy
- Vicar: Revd Rachma Abbott

Christ Church is the parish church of the village of Broad Town in Wiltshire, England. Constructed between 1844 and 1846 as a late Commissioners' church, it remains an active parish church and is a Grade II listed building.

== History ==
Historic England gives a construction date for the church of 1844–1846. Nikolaus Pevsner records the architect as W. Hinton Campbell and writes "The detail quite seriously and generously done". The land was given by Horatio Nelson Goddard, and money from eight members of the Goddard family was augmented by a large amount from the Marchioness of Ailesbury.

Repairs and refurbishment in 1937 included replacement of timbers affected by dry rot and woodworm.

The cookery writer Jane Grigson is buried in the churchyard, alongside her husband, Geoffrey. The church remains an active parish church and holds regular services.

== Architecture and description ==
The church is of ashlar Bath stone, with six bays and a bellcote. Pevsner describes Christ Church as "in the lancet style" and its Historic England designation records it as "a handsome building". The church is designated Grade II.

== Parish ==
A chapelry was created for the new church in 1846 from parts of the parishes of Broad Hinton and Clyffe Pypard, and the vicars of those two parishes were to take turns in appointing a perpetual curate to serve the church. Broad Town was given parish status in 1857. Between 1951 and 1974, Broad Town had no vicar and was instead allied with St Bartholomew and All Saints’ Church in Wootton Bassett. Today, the parish is part of the Lyneham and Woodhill benefice, alongside five neighbouring parishes.

Parish registers from 1847 are held at the Wiltshire and Swindon History Centre, Chippenham.

== Sources ==
- "Grigson [née McIntire], (Heather Mabel) Jane". Oxford Dictionary of National Biography (online ed.). Oxford University Press. 2015. doi:10.1093/ref:odnb/39832. (Subscription, Wikipedia Library access or UK public library membership required.)
- Pevsner, Nikolaus; Cherry, Bridget (2002) [1963]. Wiltshire. The Buildings of England. New Haven, US & London, UK: Yale University Press. ISBN 9780300096590. OCLC 1052824287.
