= Patrick Rance =

English cheesemonger

Rance with some of his cheeses

Patrick Lowry Cole Holwell Rance (18 March 1918 – 22 August 1999) was a cheesemonger who has been considered responsible for saving many British specialist cheeses from extinction. He is known for writing The Great British Cheese Book (1982) and The French Cheese Book (1989).

== Life and career ==
Rance was born in Southend-on-Sea, the youngest of five children of the Rev Frederick Ernest Rance, vicar of All Saints Church. Shortly after he was born the family moved to St Margaret's, Leytonstone, where Frederick Rance held a daily early morning service for the local milkmen at 5am. Rance's obituarist in The Times comments, "A respect for dairy workers was thus instilled in Rance from his earliest years." He was educated at Christ's Hospital from where he went on to the Royal Military Academy, Sandhurst in 1936. He was commissioned in the Northamptonshire Regiment in 1938. When the Second World War broke out he was seconded to the Buffs (Royal East Kent Regiment), where he was adjutant of a wartime battalion, and taught a number of his men to read and write. He was promoted to major at the age of 24, and served at the Battle of Anzio in 1944. After the war he was employed in Vienna on intelligence duties. He retired from the Army in 1949 and worked for two years at Conservative Central Office in London.

In 1951 Rance married a journalist, Janet Maxtone Graham, and in 1954 they took over Wells Stores in Streatley, Berkshire. At first the store sold only three cheeses: Dutch Edam, New Zealand Cheddar, and Danish Blue. Rance gradually extended the size and quality of the range of cheeses on offer. By 1980 he had 150 cheeses for sale. The Times commented:

A visit to Wells Stores became a Saturday treat for people from all over Berkshire and Oxfordshire, who brought their house guests with them. Radio 3 played in the background, and, with his pint-sized mug of room-temperature tea behind him, his blue stripy apron on, and his monocle nestling under his right eyebrow, Rance would hand out cubes of cheese for customers to try. He was passionate about good cheese, longing to give people a taste, to demonstrate how much more succulent and flavoursome raw-milk cheese is than pasteurised block cheese.

The food writer Egon Ronay credits Rance with "the almost single-handed creation of the British farm cheese industry – far beyond the tiny, pre-war cottage industry – through advising, encouraging, pleading, coaxing, writing and broadcasting without any financial reward – a singular act of selflessness". He campaigned for the use of unpasteurised milk in cheeses, and argued that unpasteurised cheese had acidity levels that prevented the growth of harmful bacteria such as listeria. When a scandal erupted about a listeria outbreak that killed some 30 people and was initially blamed on unpasteurised cheese, Rance made much of the fact that the infected cheese had been made from pasteurised milk.

Rance's love of British cheese, and concern to promote craft producers inspired The Great British Cheese Book, which was published in 1982, and enthusiastically welcomed by food writers such as Ronay and Jane Grigson. In 1985 after the book was published in paperback, The Times said that it was "readable, encyclopaedic, and has justly been described as a tour de force and a classic". The success of the book led Rance's publishers to ask him to write a companion volume about French cheeses. After six years of research by Rance and his wife all over France The French Cheese Book was published in 1989. The leading French expert on cheese, Pierre Androuët, rated it the best there had ever been on the subject.

Janet Rance died in 1996. Rance died three years later at the age of 81, survived by their seven children.

== Publications ==
- Rance, Patrick. (1982) The Great British Cheese Book. London: Macmillan
- Rance, Patrick. (1989) The French Cheese Book. London: Macmillan
