= Hindle Wakes (dish) =

Hindle Wakes is a cold poultry dish supposedly associated with the Bolton area of Greater Manchester, England. Its origins are claimed to point to Flemish weavers in 14th century Lancashire. The dish consists of a long-steamed capon or boiling fowl, enhanced with black, green and yellow colouring provided by a stuffing of pig's blood or prunes for the black, butter lemon sauce for the yellow and green for the garnish. The dish is prepared by stuffing a fowl with a combination of breadcrumbs, lemon, pig's blood or prunes, then steaming for four hours prior to roasting for thirty minutes and covering in a lemon butter sauce and greenery.

Some have suggested that the recipe was invented, along with its supposed history, in the mid-20th century. The earliest published version of the recipe is in Florence White's 'Good Things in England', published by Jonathan Cape in 1932, as noted by Jane Grigson in English Food (1974). Grigson goes on to cast doubt on the origin of the name and wonder whether it was taken from the eponymous 1912 play by Stanley Houghton, which would imply that it is in fact a modern dish, although she gives no further evidence. However, Dorothy Hartley, in her classic 1954 'Food in England', writes that "this very old English recipe has come down through many centuries unchanged", and states her belief that "the Flemish spinners settled at Bolton le Moor [are] responsible for this recipe."
