= Grigson =

Grigson is a surname. Notable people with the surname include:

== People ==
- Christopher Grigson (1926–2001), British naval architect and electronics engineer credited with inventing scanning electron diffraction
- Geoffrey Grigson (1905–1985), British writer
- James Grigson (1932–2004), American forensic psychiatrist
- Jane Grigson (1928–1990), English cookery writer
- John Grigson (1893–1943), British RAF pilot
- Lionel Grigson (1942–1994), British jazz pianist, cornettist and teacher
- Mary Grigson (born 1971), Australian cyclist
- Ryan Grigson (born 1972), American football executive
- Sophie Grigson (born 1959), English cookery writer and celebrity chef
- Wilfrid Grigson (1896–1948), British soldier and civil servant

== Fictional characters ==
- Colin Grigson, bass player for parody metal band Bad News (band)

== See also ==
- Jane Grigson Award, award issued by the International Association of Culinary Professionals (IACP)
- Gregson, surname
