= Gregson =

Gregson is a surname. Notable people with the surname include:

== People ==
- Johnathan Gregson (2011), American social rights activist, political analyst
- Alf Gregson (1889–1968), English football player
- Edward Gregson (born 1945), English composer
- John Gregson (1919–1975), English actor
- Joseph Gelson Gregson (1835–1909), English Baptist preacher who worked with British Indian Army
- Malcolm Gregson (1943–2024), English golfer
- Matthew Gregson (1749–1824), English antiquary
- Michael Craig (actor) (born Michael Francis Gregson, 1929), English actor and screenwriter
- Natasha Gregson Wagner (1970) American actress
- Randy Gregson (c. 1919 – 2010), American tennis player and official
- Richard Gregson (1930–2019), English film producer and screenwriter
- Thomas Gregson (1798–1874), Premier of Tasmania
- William Gregson (slave trader) (1721–1800), English slave trader and Lord Mayor of Liverpool
- William Gregson (barrister) (1790–1863), English barrister and Home Office under-secretary
- William Gregson (cricketer) (1877–1963), Scottish cricketer

== Fictional characters ==
- Michael Gregson, a character in the show Downton Abbey
- Inspector Tobias Gregson, a minor character in the Sherlock Holmes stories by Arthur Conan Doyle and various adaptations
- Captain Thomas "Tommy" Gregson, a character in the show Elementary

== See also ==
- Grigson, surname
