= British Nutrition Foundation =

British food industry registered charity

- Abbreviation: BNF
- Formation: 1967
- Legal status: Registered charity; Company limited by guarantee
- Location: New Derwent House, 69-73 Theobalds Road, London
- Region served: UK
- CEO: Elaine Hindal
- Main organ: BNF Council
- Website: www.nutrition.org.uk

The British Nutrition Foundation is a British charity mainly funded by the food industry. It has been criticised for conflicts of interest, and for downplaying them. It presents itself to journalists, the public, and the government as independent, impartial, disinterested, and scientifically rigorous; its industry funders also promote this image.

The BNF has advocated for mandatory reporting of healthy food sales, and against public-health interventions that might harm food-industry profits, often using tobacco-industry techniques, such as creating unwarranted doubt and uncertainty around the scientific evidence.

In 2023, the BNF had an income of £1.5million, with an expenditure of £1.6million. £0.113million were spent on fundraising.

== Government lobbying ==
The BNF is open about its intention to shape UK Government policy on food, thus serving as a special-interest group for the food industry, which largely funds the foundation.

=== 20th century ===
During the Second World War, a great deal of official attention was paid to ensuring that the UK population had adequate nutrition despite the blockade. Food rationing (1940–1953) restricted consumption of animal products, fats, sugar, and tea, and replaced white bread with the wholegrain National Loaf, increasing vegetable and fiber consumption. When rationing ended, diets began to change, as did diet-related illness; rates of heart disease, for instance, increased sharply.

The British Nutrition Foundation was set up in 1967.

==== NACNE report ====
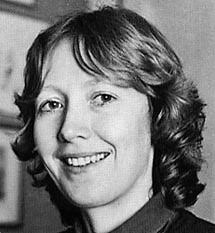
Caroline Walker, secretary to NACNE. In 1983, she challenged a bid to make the BNF officially responsible for nutritional education in Britain, saying the BNF was not fit to advise on nutrition, because it was entirely funded by the food industry.

The National Advisory Committee on Nutrition Education (NACNE) was set up by the British government in 1979, to provide a review of nutritional information and policy. The BNF was allowed to sit on the committee, which was to become controversial. The first draft of NACNE's report was finished in April 1981, and the third draft was leaked to the press in June 1983, after it became plain that it would not be released.

At a BNF annual conference on 22 June 1983, the final official speaker suggested that the British government make the BNF the national body officially responsible for nutritional education. The secretary of NACNE, Caroline Walker, stood up from the audience to respond. She said that as the BNF was entirely sponsored by the food industry, it was not fit to advise the public on nutrition. The conference chair and then-BNF-president, Albert Neuberger, said that her statement was libellous and demanded that she retract it. She refused.

Journalist Geoffrey Cannon, who had a leaked copy of the third draft report, asked about why the conference, on 'Implementing Dietary Guidelines', hadn't mentioned an upcoming report that laid out quantitative nutrition guidelines and regulatory means of reaching them. The BNF director-general (then Derek Shrimpton), taken aback, said that the report would not be published by NACNE, but the chair of NACNE's expert sub-committee was free to publish it.

On 3 July, the leaked NACNE draft was reported in the news press; in September, the leaked draft was published in a major medical journal, The Lancet. On 10 October, the NACNE report was officially published. Controversy around the suppression continued to generate news stories for some years.

The report recommended regulating the formulation of processed foods (to make them less unhealthy), more explicit nutritional labelling, and incentives for breeding leaner meat. It said that the measures it suggested could halve the average intake of sugar and salt, and reduce the intake of fats by a quarter, replacing them with vegetables, fruit, dietary fiber, and starchy foods. It said that this would significantly reduce obesity, cardiovascular disease, diabetes, stroke, colorectal cancer, and other major diseases, and improve the health of the whole population.

The report also deprecated the term "balanced diet" and contemporary food groups, saying that they were no longer helpful. It said that in the past, when nutritional deficiencies were the major form of diet-related disease, encouraging people to eat a greater variety of foods was useful, because most people who got nutritional deficiencies were eating a narrow range of foods lacking a specific nutrient. In the 1970s, they wrote, that was no longer a major problem in the United Kingdom; people needed to eat healthier foods, not more varied ones.

No official action was taken on the report; the recommendations were not implemented.

Derek Shrimpton, who had been BNF director general in this period (1982-1984), said in a 1985 interview: "In the period I was there the foundation was solely taken up with defence actions for the industry." He also said that BNF had constantly fought against reductions in sugar, salt, and fat consumption, by constantly frustrating government committees aiming to recommend reductions.

=== 21st century ===
The UK government has repeatedly paid the BNF to develop educational materials on nutrition. Tim Lobstein, a director at the International Association for the Study of Obesity-International Obesity Task Force (now the World Obesity Federation), said that the BNF has produced educational materials seem to support industry messages. For instance, he said, in 2003 it "did a big piece of work for the Food Standards Agency [a government department] reviewing 'influences on consumer food choices' which conveniently left out any review of the influence of marketing and advertising techniques".

In 2005, 26 UK MPs signed an Early Day Motion in Parliament expressing concern over BNF activities, and requesting more transparency. They noted that the BNF was "primarily industry-supported" and was advising the government on

- vending
- educational resources for schools
- the balanced diet
- sugary drinks
- extra curricular school activities
- the National Curriculum
- school meals
- vocational qualifications (the UK has no requirements for the titles "nutritionist", unlike "dieticians", who must be registered)
- food labelling
- nutrient profiling
- food irradiation
- the future of agriculture
- genetically modified foods

They also noted that members included "McDonald's, Coca-Cola, Northern Foods, Nutrasweet, Kraft, Cadbury-Schweppes, Kelloggs, Nestle, Sainsbury's, Asda and Procter & Gamble".

The Campaign Against Trans Fats in Food said that the BNF opposed regulation of xenobiotic trans fats in a 2009 BFN submission to the Scottish parliament, urging the parliament, which was considering regulation, to do nothing.

The BNF was suggesting against action on ultra-processed foods in 2023, saying there should be no policies on them without an agreed definition The BNF has argued that since poor people are economically forced to eat ultra-processed foods, taking regulatory measures to increase the consumption of non-UPF foods will increase inequality. It has also argued that publicly condemning of ultra-processed foods as unhealthy will make poor people feel stigmatized and guilty for not eating a financially-unacheivable diet. Opponents argue that poor people should not be economically forced to eat unhealthy foods, and policy should take that as its goal.

== Media influence ==
The media seek out the British Nutrition Foundation as a ready source of authoritative comment on matters of nutrition and wider food policy. In return the foundation swiftly delivers succinct analysis in a language that suits its audience and does not offend either its partners in Whitehall [the British government] or its paymasters in the food industry. It is a relationship that shows every sign of continuing.

— A 2010 British Medical Journal article, also published in a shortened form in The Independent

The BNF presents itself to the media as a disinterested commentator. It focusses on providing swift and expert advice to journalists who are not specialist medical reporters.

The BNF's statements have been described as "artfully true", using technical scientific terminology to creating a misleading impression of uncertainty, even when the scientific evidence is as clear-cut as the link between lung cancer and smoking.

It is often treated by the media as a source of impartial nutritional information. When it is quoted in the media, it is usually just as the "British Nutritional Foundation"; a 2010 search found that only 2/128 media mentions of the BNF mentioned that it has industry funding.

Member-funders may have significant conflicts of interest; for instance, the BNF organized a 2010 conference on sweeteners without conspicuously disclosing that its funders include then-sugar-manufacturers Tate & Lyle and British Sugar, and artificial sweetener manufacturers Ajinomoto (Aminosweet-brand aspartame) and McNeil Consumer Nutritionals (Splenda), and sweet-drinks manufacturers Coca-Cola and Pepsi. It presented itself as objective and evidence-based.

The BNF also contributed to a controversial 2023 industry-funded panel that generated more-positive media coverage of ultra-processed foods. Such foods are manufactured or retailed by many BNF members.

== Direct-to-consumer marketing ==
The BNF contributes extensively to materials aimed at the general public. It describes itself as a supporter of informed consumer choice. For instance, in 2002, it contributed to the PhunkyFoods campaign, aimed at under-11-year-olds and funded by Nestlé, Northern Foods, and Cargill. It has also channeled industry funding for government programs such as the 2007 "License to Cook" (www.licencetocook.org.uk), a school cookbook for 11-to-12-year-olds. The BNF's "Healthy Eating week" in 2023 was sponsored by supermarkets and processed-food companies including Coca-Cola.

The BNF argues that "There is no such thing as a bad food, only a bad diet", and presents itself as a champion of individual choice, opposing government regulation. These are both standard food-industry messages, based on those used by the tobacco industry. They are used to shift blame for the public health harms cause by unhealthy food from producers and regulators onto the consumer.

== Academic journal ==
The official journal of the BNF, Nutrition Bulletin, describes itself as an international, peer-reviewed journal. It is published quarterly by Wiley. It says that its coverage has included review articles and news items on nutrition, but that since acquisition of an impact factor and MEDLINE coverage, an increasing number of papers reporting original research have been included; many articles are open-access.

Articles in the Nutrition Review may be publicized in press releases put out by the BNF, and garner substantial media coverage. The quality of the scholarship and peer review in the journal has been questioned.

== Staffing and governance ==
Two members of the British Nutrition Foundation's staff, and three members of the board of trustees and two members of the oversight committees, are or have been employees of the food industry. It has been claimed that staff to move back and forth between the BNF and industry jobs. For instance, Paul Hebblethwaite, as of 2009 a 2009 member of the BNF board of trustees and its former chairman, has had "a distinguished career in the food industry working for a number of major companies including Cadbury-Schweppes and Chivers-Hartley", and was simultaneously chairman of the Biscuit, Cake, Chocolate and Confectionery Trade Association.

Under its Memorandum and Articles of Association, the BNF Board has no more than 12 Trustees. Up to 3 are allowed to be currently working in the food industry; there are no restrictions on past and future employment. The BNF website says that trustees are appointed by the Board and serve for a term of three years, with each Trustee able to serve for a maximum of nine years, and that the BNF also has an Editorial Advisory Board, educational working groups, and a "register of interests" for board members and senior managers.

== Sources ==
- British Nutrition Foundation (2022). "Annual Trustees' Report and Accounts 2021-2022". UK Charity Commission for England and Wales. Text was copied from this source, which is available under an Open Government Licence v3.0. © Crown copyright.
