= John Corry (writer) =

Irish topographer and historian writer

- Born: Ireland
- Occupations: Historian, journalist, topographer
- Writing career
- Language: English
- Genres: History, journalism

John Corry (fl. 1825) was an Irish topographer and historian writer. Among his other works he wrote and published The Life of George Washington, first published in 1800.

== Life ==
Corry, who was self-taught, was born in the north of Ireland. As an adult he went to Dublin, where he was a journalist. About 1792 he moved to London, as a professional writer. His history after 1825 is unknown.

== Works ==
Most of Corry's works were published anonymously. Besides editing a periodical, he furnished the letterpress for the History of Liverpool (1810), published by Thomas Troughton; wrote vol. i. of the History of Bristol, 2 vols. (1816), the second volume being supplied by John Evans; and a History of Macclesfield (1817). More ambitious was the History of Lancashire, 2 vols. (1825), with a dedication to George IV. It was, however, derivative of a work of Matthew Gregson, of 1817.

His book The Detector of Quackery (1802) was a criticism of medical frauds and quackery of his day.

== Publications ==
- Poems, [Dublin?], 17—.
- The Adventures of Felix and Rosarito, London, 1782.
- The Life of George Washington, London, 1800.
- The Detector of Quackery, London, 1802 (new edition under the title of Quack Doctors Dissected, London, Gloucester [printed 1810]).
- A Satirical View of London, London, 1801, which came to a fourth edition in 1809.
- Edwy and Bertha, London, 1802.
- Memoirs of Alfred Berkeley, London, 1802.
- Tales for the Amusement of Young Persons, London, 1802.
- The Life of William Cowper, London, 1803.
- The Life of Joseph Priestley, Birmingham, 1804 (2nd edition in the same year).
- Sebastian and Zeila, London [1805?].
- The Suicide; or, the Progress of Error, London [1805?].
- The Mysterious Gentleman Farmer, 3 vols., London, 1808.
- Strictures on the Expedience of the Addingtonian Extinguisher [i.e. Lord Sidmouth's Protestant Dissenting Bill], Macclesfield, 1811.
- The Elopement … Third edition (the History of Eliza, &c.), London [1810?].
- The English Metropolis; or, London in the year 1820, London, 1820.
- Memoir of John Collier ("Tim Bobbin"), prefixed to an edition of his Works and also in the edition published at Manchester in 1862.

== Notes ==
Attribution

This article incorporates text from a publication now in the public domain: Stephen, Leslie, ed. (1887). "Corry, John". Dictionary of National Biography. Vol. 12. London: Smith, Elder & Co.
