= William Gregson =

William Gregson may refer to:

- William Gregson (slave trader) (1721–1800), English slave trader and Lord Mayor of Liverpool
- William Gregson (barrister) (1790–1863), English barrister and Home Office under-secretary
- William Gregson (cricketer) (1877–1963), Scottish cricketer
