= Serpentine Running and Triathlon Club =

- Nickname(s): Serpies
- Founded: 1981
- Home ground: Paddington Recreation Ground; Maida Vale; London
- Website: www.serpentine.org.uk
Home

Serpentine Running and Triathlon Club is a running, athletics, triathlon and cross-country running club based in Marylebone, London, United Kingdom. but uses a variety of places around London for training sessions. Wednesday club sessions are based around Hyde Park. Track sessions, cycling and swimming training are located in different venues around London including Paddington track and Battersea Park, Richmond Park, Regents Park and pools in Kings Cross and near London Bridge. The club draws runners from across Greater London. The club was chosen as Athletics Weekly's club of the month in May 2013 in light of its growth to a membership of 2200 runners.

== History ==
Serpentine Running Club was established after an appeal in the ‘Fun Runner’ column of Running magazine (now Runner’s World) following the inaugural London Marathon in 1981, calling for volunteers to form a team to run the second London Marathon. About 50 runners responded and arranged to meet by the bridge over the Serpentine on May 30, 1981 at 9.45am. From the original group of 50 runners, 42, including Geoffrey Cannon, went on to complete the 1982 marathon and decided to carry on running afterwards. There was also a clear majority wanting to form their own club, with the Serpentine name emerging after some discussion. By the early Nineties the club was competing in cross-country, track and field and road running, but it almost folded in the late Nineties.

However, aided by an increasing interest in running, combined with the launching of the club’s extensive website, the club enjoyed a revival early in the 21st century. Serpentine organise the New Year’s Day 10km – attracting more than 600 entries each year – the Jekyll and Hyde Park Duathlon in October, and the Last Friday of the Month 5km in Hyde Park– run continuously since 1992, inheriting the London Road Runners’ original 5km handicap format, and converted into the popular open race it is today. The only time since 1992 when 5k races did not take place was in 2020. In March the Serpentine announced that March, April, May and June races have been cancelled due to Covid-19 pandemic. In 2022 Serpentine recommenced its running events, and confirmed its decision to run the NY's day event, for Non-Members of the club, in the categories; male, female and unassigned. On 1 December 2024, the club transitioned from Serpentine Running Club to the Serpentine Running and Triathlon Club, a Charitable Incorporated Organisation (CIO) and a charity registered under number 1207174. This change was voted for by members at a special general meeting on 20 November 2023.

== Leagues ==
Members compete in road races all year round including cross country in the winter (taking part in two leagues), in County and National Championships, in athletics leagues and in international and national triathlon events. In the summer, they have men's and women's track & field teams in the Southern Athletics League, the Southern Vets League, and the Rosenheim League. The other major focus in summer of course is triathlon and duathlon racing, with members competing at every distance (in fact several hundred club members only ever compete in multi-sport). Members compete at international level for England and other nations in running, track & field, duathlon and triathlon competitions.

== Notable athletes ==
- Eddie Brocklesby- founder and director of Silverfit, a charity dedicated to the promotion of the health benefits of physical activity for older people and triathlete.
- Nick Torry - represented England at the 2014 Commonwealth Games and was the UK’s fastest marathoner in 2013.
- Richard Phillips - (Wales international in mountain running)
- Becky Glover - (world-class triathlon age- grouper)
- Sandra McDougall - (third in Surrey cross-country championships this season and first in the Surrey 10km champs 2012)
- Andrea Clements - (first place in the first leg of the national four-stage road relays in 2012)
- Hilary Walker - (club president and ultra-distance record-holder)
- Huw Lobb - (the first man to win Man versus Horse Marathon in 2 hours, 5 minutes and 19 seconds)
