= United States Tennis Association =

National governing body for tennis in the United States

- Sport: Tennis
- Abbreviation: USTA
- Founded: 1881
- Affiliation: World Tennis
- Location: Purchase, New York
- President: Brian Hainline
- CEO: Interim Co-Ceos: Brian Valey & Andrea Hirsch. Incoming CEO: Craig Tiley
- Secretary: Gregory Metz

Official website
- www.usta.com
- (United States)

The United States Tennis Association (USTA) is the national governing body for tennis in the United States. A not-for-profit organization with more than 700,000 members, it invests 100% of its proceeds to promote and develop the growth of tennis, from the grass-roots to the professional levels. The association was created to standardize rules and regulations and to promote and develop the growth of tennis in the United States.

The USTA runs the USTA Billie Jean King National Tennis Center which hosts the US Open every year.

The USTA has leagues in most places for adults skill levels between beginner and pro. The USTA also hosts tournaments across the country every weekend for club players or professionals.

== History ==
The USTA was previously known as the United States National Lawn Tennis Association (USNLTA) and was established in 1881 by a small group of tennis club members in New York City and northeastern clubs, where most lawn tennis was played. In 1920 the word 'National' was dropped from the organization's name, making the abbreviation USLTA. In 1975, the word "Lawn" was officially dropped from the name.

In 1929, the organization rejected applications from two African American contestants for entry into the national junior indoor tennis championships. When this drew objection from the National Association for the Advancement of Colored People, the group's executive secretary Edward B. Moss responded that "we believe that as a practical matter the present method of separate associations for the administration of the affairs and championships of colored and white players should be continued". This separation was maintained by requiring USLTA players to be members of local organizations, many of which had no Black players. In 1950, when the group, facing continued protest, reconsidered and created an exception allowing Althea Gibson to play in that year's national tournament.

== Organization ==
The USTA has 17 geographical sections with more than 700,000 individual members, 7,000 organizational members, and professional staff. The USTA National Office is located in Purchase, NY. The USTA National Campus located in Orlando, FL.

== Geographical sections ==
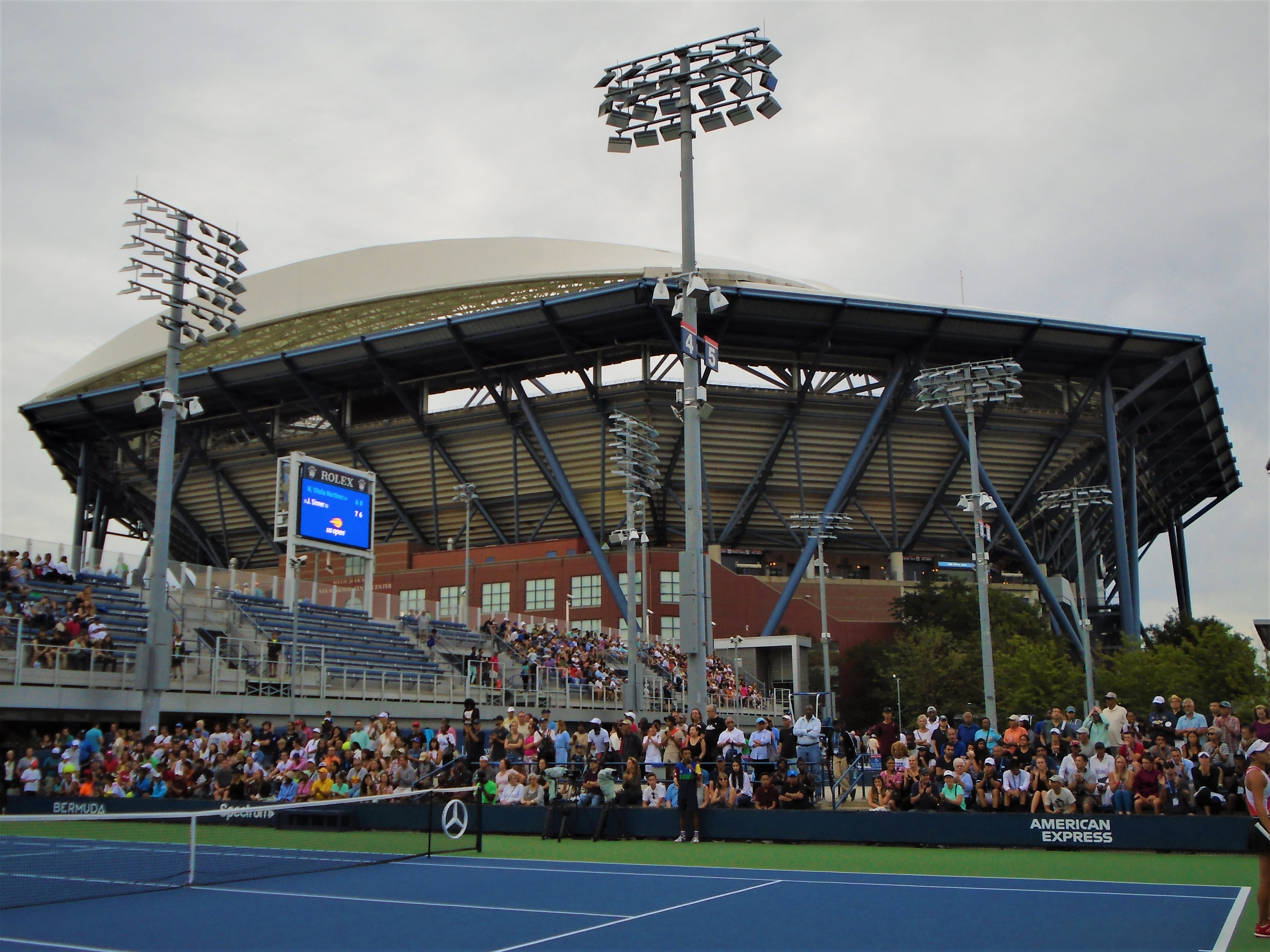
Court 4 with Arthur Ashe Stadium in the background at The United States Tennis Association's Billie Jean King National Tennis Center.

- USTA Caribbean
- USTA Eastern
- USTA Florida
- USTA Hawaii Pacific
- USTA Intermountain
- USTA Mid-Atlantic
- USTA Middle States
- USTA Midwest
- USTA Missouri Valley
- USTA New England
- USTA Northern
- USTA Northern California
- USTA Pacific Northwest
- USTA Southern
- USTA Southern California
- USTA Southwest
- USTA Texas

== NTRP Ratings ==
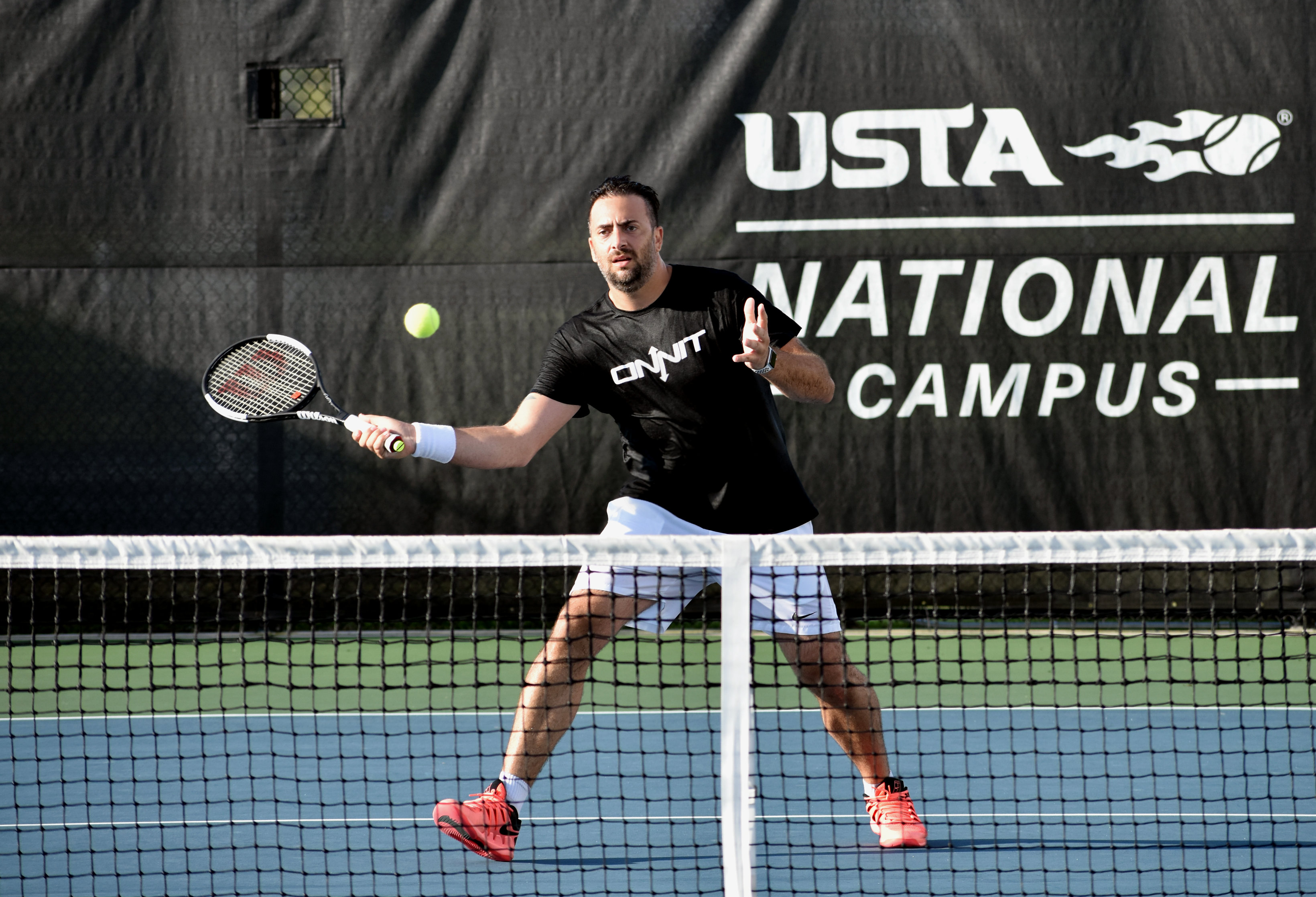
At the USTA National Campus in 2019.

The USTA (along with the USPTA) created the National Tennis Rating Program (NTRP) or more commonly NTRP ratings to place players into various skill levels. NTRP ratings range from the beginner 1.5 with .5 increments all the way up to 7.0 or world-class players. NTRP ratings are used in the leagues and tournaments to help provide more compatible matches. At the end of each calendar year, the USTA calculates and publishes everyone's year-end rating online. Ratings are calculated using a computer algorithm that adjusts ratings based on how actual outcomes compare to expected outcomes for each match. Expected outcomes are determined based on the difference between the ratings in hundredths of the players on the court. How many matches you've won and if it was a singles or doubles match is not a part of the calculation. New players or anyone with an expired NTRP rating go through the self-rate process to determine their entry point. Specific answers to a series of questions allow the computer to provide a suggested rating for players to start.

== Programs ==
The USTA hosts adult tournaments in most cities with populations over 150,000 people. Leagues for adults with ratings ranging from 2.5 to 5.0 are organized in the Spring and/or Fall. In most areas, the adult seasons consist of singles, doubles, and mixed doubles leagues in the Spring. Fewer cities have Fall leagues for singles and/or alternate league types such as "combo", "mixed combo", or "tri-level".

In most states, there are between one and five tournaments each weekend. Adults with a 3.0 to 4.5 rating can usually play in these tournaments.

Leagues include: 10 and under; Juniors; Adults 18-40; and Adults 40 or older. Anyone over 40 may request placement in the 18-40 league.

In addition, the USTA Foundation supports the National Junior Tennis and Learning (NJTL) program, comprising more than 250 nonprofit youth development organizations that offer free or low-cost tennis and education programming to over 150,000 under-resourced youth each year.

== Tournaments ==
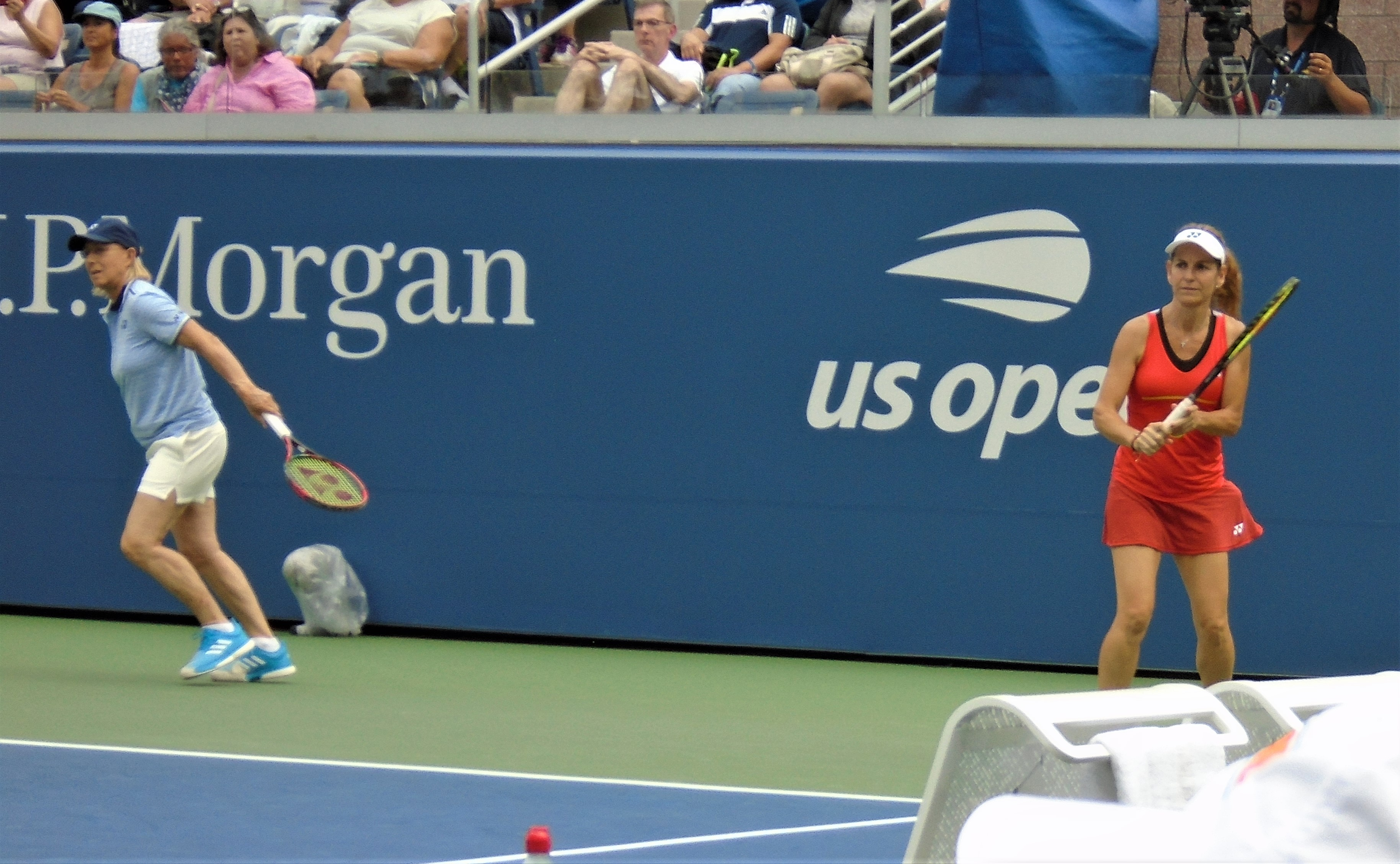
Martina Navratilova and Arantxa Sánchez Vicario warming up at the 2019 US Open.

There are 11 active ATP tournaments held in the United States. Nine are held on hard courts, one on clay, and one on grass. USA hosts one Grand Slam, three Masters, two 500, and five 250 level tournaments.

1. Dallas - 500 (2025)
2. Delray - 250
3. Indian Wells Masters
4. Miami Masters
5. Houston - 250 Clay
6. Newport - 250 Grass
7. Atlanta - 250
8. Washington - 500
9. Cincinnati Masters
10. Winston-Salem - 250
11. US Open
- New Haven Open at Yale (until 2019)
- Boys' Junior National Tennis Championship – under-16 and under-18
- USTA Pro Circuit – men's and women's tournaments
- USTA Tennis on Campus

== Presidents ==
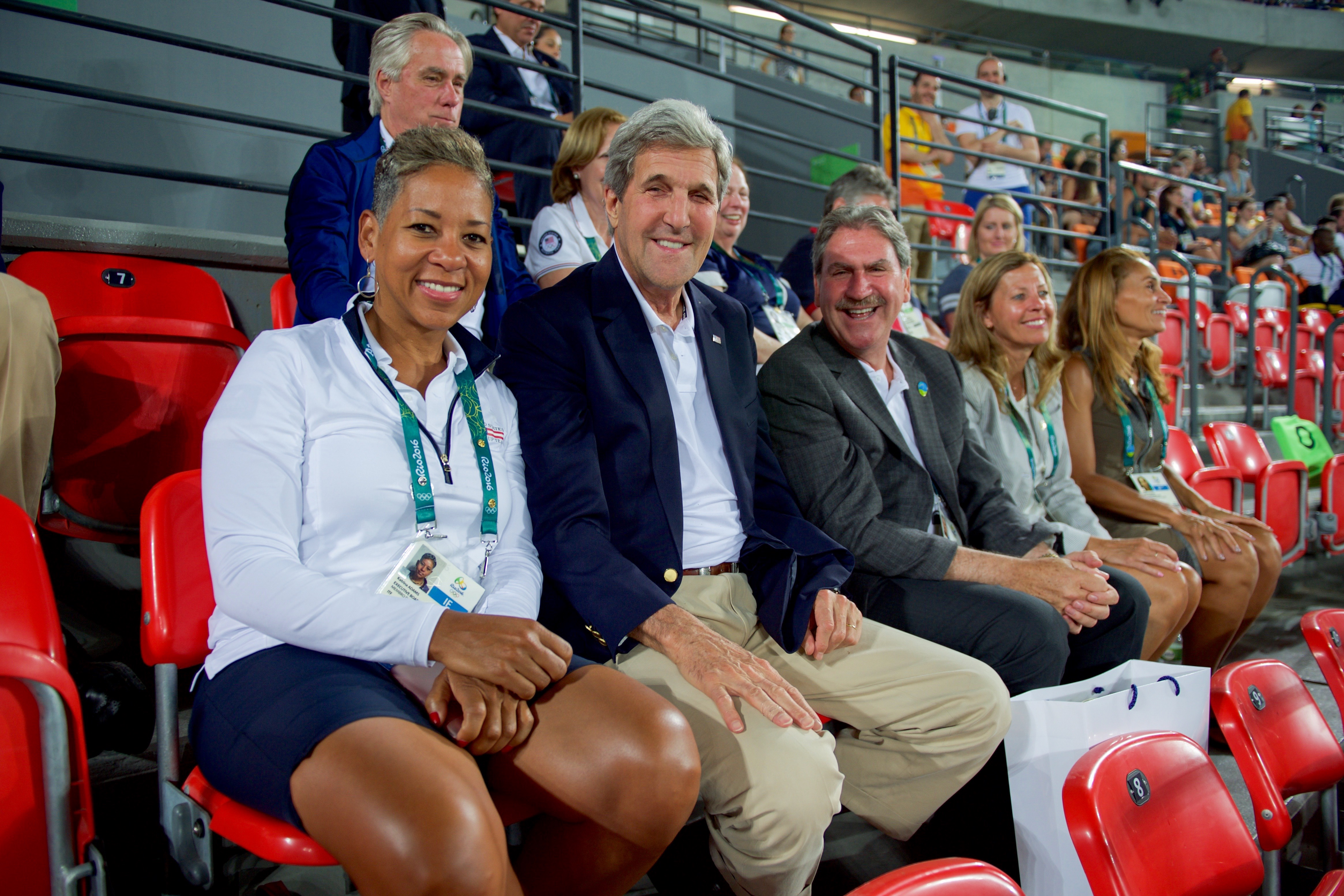
U.S. Secretary of State John Kerry sits with incoming United States Tennis Association President Katrina Adams as they watched U.S. tennis player Venus Williams play Belgian tennis player Kirsten Flipkens on August 6, 2016.

Name	Presidency
Robert Shaw Oliver	1881–1882
James Dwight	1882–1884
Thomas K. Fraser	1885–1886
Richard Sears	1887–1888
Joseph Clark	1889–1891
Henry Slocum	1892–1893
James Dwight	1894–1911
Robert Wrenn	1912–1915
George Adee	1916–1919
Julian Myrick	1920–1922
Dwight F. Davis	1923
George W. Wightman	1924
Jones W. Mersereau	1925–1927
Samuel H. Collom	1928–1929
Louis Dailey	1930
Louis J. Carruthers	1931–1932
Henry S. Know	1933
Walter Merrill Hall	1934–1936
Holcombe Ward	1937–1947
Lawrence Baker	1948–1950
Russell B. Kingman	1951–1952
James H. Bishop	1953–1955
Renville H. McMann	1956–1957
Victor Denny	1958–1959
George Barnes	1960–1961
Edward A. Turville	1962–1963
James B. Dickey	1964
Martin Tressel	1965–1966
Robert J. Kelleher	1967–1968
Alastair Martin	1969–1970
Robert B. Colwell	1971–1972
Walter E. Elcock	1973–1974
Stan Malless	1975–1976
William E. Hester	1977–1978
Joseph E. Carrico	1979–1980
Marvin P. Richmond	1981–1982
Hunter L. Delatour, Jr.	1983–1984
J. Randolph Gregson	1985–1986
Gordon D. Jorgensen	1987–1988
David R. Markin	1989–1990
Robert A. Cookson	1991–1992
J. Howard Frazer	1993–1994
Lester M. Snyder, Jr.	1995–1996
Harry Marmion	1997–1998
Judy Levering *	1999–2000
Mervin Heller, Jr.	2001–2002
Alan Schwartz	2003–2004
Franklin Johnson	2005–2006
Jane Brown Grimes	2007–2008
Lucy S. Garvin	2009–2010
Jon Vegosen	2011–2012
David Haggerty	2013–2014
Katrina Adams **	2015–2018
Patrick Galbraith	2019–2020
Michael McNulty	2021–present

*First female to be elected USTA president.
**First African-American and first former professional tennis player to be elected USTA president.

== Awards ==
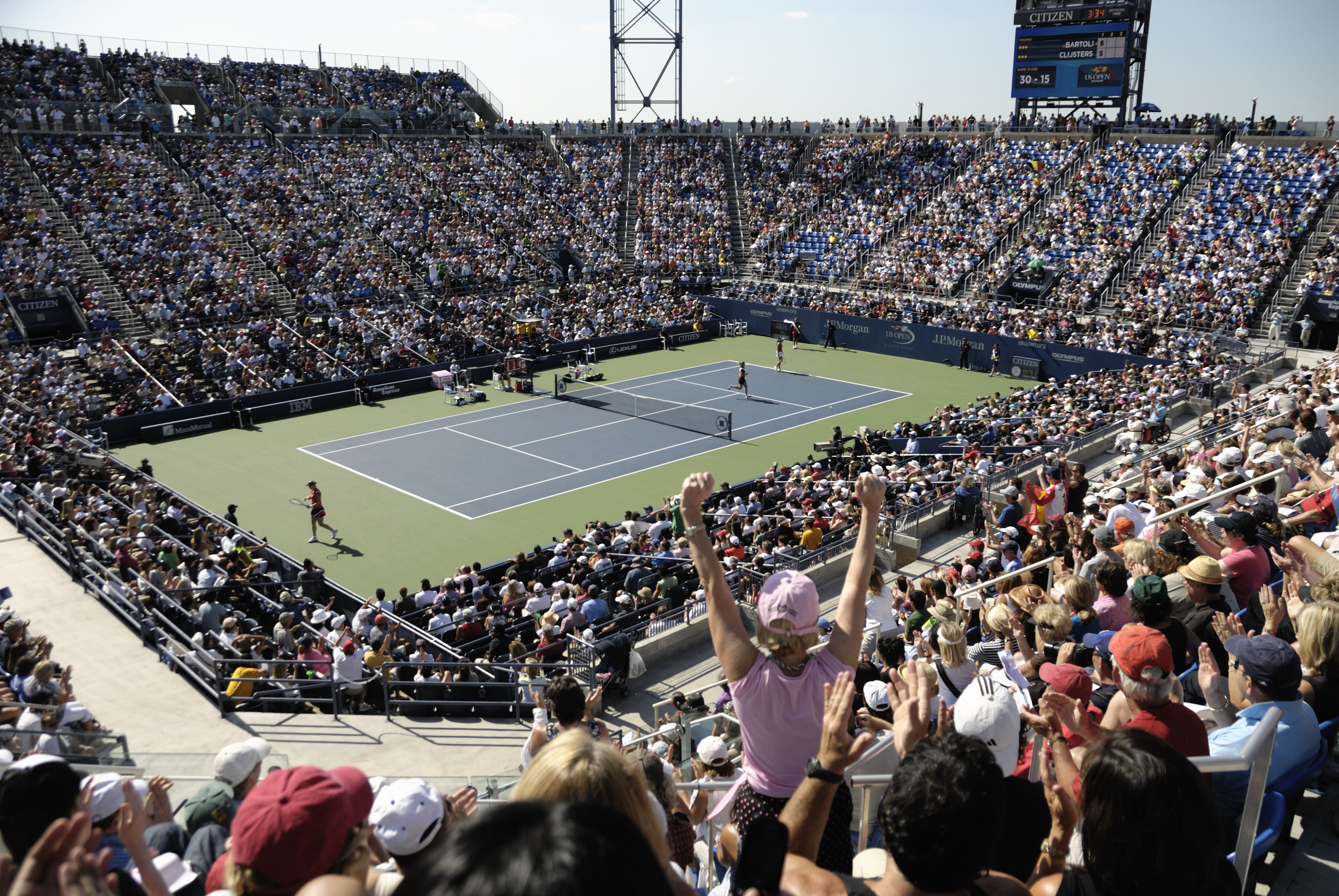
At the Louis Armstrong Stadium in 2009.

- Samuel Hardy Award - The International Tennis Hall of Fame annually presents the Samuel Hardy Award to a USTA volunteer in recognition of long and outstanding service to the sport of tennis. The recipient must exemplify those qualities of personal unselfishness and devotion to the game which have been an inspiration to others. The award is presented at the USTA annual meeting. The honorees are selected by a committee appointed by the chairman of the International Tennis Hall of Fame.
- Tennis Educational Merit Awards for Men and Women - The International Tennis Hall of Fame annually presents the Tennis Educational Merit Awards for Men and Women to individuals who are citizens or residents of the United States. The awards are presented to a man and woman who have made notable contributions in the tennis educational field at the national level and have demonstrated leadership and creative skills in such areas as instruction, writing, organization and promotion of the game of tennis. The awards are presented at the USTA annual meeting. The selection of recipients is made by a committee appointed by the chairman of the International Tennis Hall of Fame. The award was initially created to honor and recognize services to the development of the game by Harry A. (Cap) Leighton, to whom the first honor was awarded posthumously in 1967.
- ITF Awards for Services to the Game (American Recipients) - This award is presented to persons who have rendered long and distinguished services to the game of tennis through their national tennis associations. Persons may be nominated by their national association or by ITF's board of directors.
- USTA Volunteer Service Award - The USTA Volunteer Service Award recognizes USTA volunteers for their years of national service to the association. Recognition awards are presented at the annual meeting to those volunteers achieving five years of service and for each five years of service thereafter. The association is proud to demonstrate its esteem and appreciation to an outstanding group of volunteers.
- Ralph W. Westcott USTA Family of the Year Award - This award was initiated in 1965 by Martin L. Tressel, President of the USTA, 1965–66, to emphasize the theme that "Tennis Is a Family Game." The honor is awarded annually to the family who in recent years has done the most to promote amateur tennis, primarily on a volunteer basis. All members of the family should participate in some way, either as players or by offering their services in running programs or tournaments or in junior development activities. The selection of recipients is made by the USTA Awards Committee from nominations submitted by the 17 USTA sections. Ralph W. Westcott donated a large silver tray as the perpetual award. This trophy was given to him upon retiring as president of the Western Tennis Association and secretary of the USTA. The names of the recipients are engraved on this tray. The trophy is presented at the USTA annual meeting.
- Service Bowl Award - "To the Player Who Yearly Makes the Most Notable Contribution to the Sportsmanship, Fellowship, and Service of Tennis"—this inscription is engraved on the Service Bowl trophy donated by Mrs. Lyman H.B. Olmsted and a group of 30 New England women in 1940 to honor the example of Mrs. Hazel H. Wightman. The Service Bowl Award is an annual award that was limited to New England women tennis players for the first four years. Since 1944, it has been awarded on a nationwide basis, usually by the USTA president at a stadium court ceremony or an executive committee meeting during the US Open.
- President's Award - Established in 1999, the President's Award annually honors an individual who has given unusual and extraordinary service to tennis and generally will be a person not considered for other USTA awards.
- Eve Kraft USTA Community Service Award - The USTA Community Service Award was established in 1974 to honor persons for outstanding field work in recreational tennis. It was renamed the Eve Kraft USTA Community Service Award in 2001. The award is given for significant contributions by individuals actively involved in tennis development through community tennis associations, parks and recreation departments, schools or community centers.
- USTA Adaptive Tennis Community Service Award - The USTA Tennis Special Populations Community Service Award was established in 2003 to recognize either an individual or a program that has demonstrated excellence, dedication and service related to tennis for special populations or those with disabilities. It was renamed the USTA Adaptive Tennis Community Service Award in 2006. For a program to qualify, it must have been in existence for a minimum of three consecutive years and be either a registered USTA Tennis Special Populations program or affiliated with one. Individuals must have worked with such a program for three consecutive years to qualify.
- USTA CTA of the Year Award - The USTA CTA of the Year Award was established in 2002 to honor a CTA (Community Tennis Association) for outstanding service rendered in growing and developing the sport of tennis in its community. The award recipient is selected from 17 nominees, one from each of the USTA sections, by a panel of USTA Community Tennis Association Development Committee members. The award is presented each February at the Community Tennis Development Workshop.
- USTA NJTL of the Year Award - The USTA Tennis NJTL Chapter of the Year Award is designed to honor an outstanding USTA Tennis NJTL (National Junior Tennis League) chapter or chapters that have demonstrated continued excellence in recreational tennis. The award recipient or recipients are selected by a panel of USTA Tennis NJTL Committee members and the Community Outreach national staff. The award is presented each February at the Community Tennis Development Workshop.
- Seniors' Service Award - A trophy for service to senior tennis is awarded each year to the person the USTA Adult/Senior Competition Committee deems most deserving of the respect and honor of all seniors. First awarded in 1958, it is awarded on the basis of the recipient's willingness, cooperation and participation, either in play or organizational work for the betterment and furtherance of senior competition. Each year the winner's name and the year are engraved on the trophy and a replica of the trophy is given to the winner.
- Super Senior Service Award - The Super Senior Service Award is given annually, since 1975, to the person who, in the opinion of the Super Senior Tennis Board of Directors, has made a notable contribution to the promotion of tennis for the 55-and-over USTA-recognized age divisions. This contribution can be made by a player, a tennis enthusiast, a tournament director or a non-player who has helped to promote tennis for the “young at heart.”
- Barbara Williams Leadership Award - The Barbara Williams Leadership Award was established in 2004 to honor Barbara Williams, a long-time USTA volunteer who gave of her time and energy to promote the sport of tennis. This award recognizes a female volunteer who, through her leadership and by her example, has encouraged and inspired others to become volunteers and assume leadership roles at the community, sectional and/or national levels of the United States Tennis Association. The selection of recipients is made by the USTA Awards Committee from nominations submitted by the 17 USTA sections.
- Brad Parks Award - The Brad Parks Award was established in 2002. It recognizes outstanding contributions to the game of wheelchair tennis and was named after Brad Parks, a pioneer of wheelchair tennis and the first wheelchair tournament champion, who has been instrumental in the development of wheelchair tennis around the world. The award is presented at the USTA annual meeting to an individual or group that has provided opportunities to wheelchair players through the development of programs that promote the growth of wheelchair tennis at the sectional or national level. The recipient may be involved through playing, coaching, sponsoring or promoting wheelchair tennis. Each annual recipient's name will be added to the permanent trophy, which will be housed at the USTA National Tennis Center, and a replica will be given to the recipient.
- John T. McGovern Award - In 1949, John T. (Terry) McGovern presented a beautiful, gold-plated trophy for an annual award to that umpire or linesman who contributed most to the cause of tennis officiating during the previous year. In addition to the trophy, McGovern contributed gold-plated medals to be given annually for the permanent possession of the award recipient. McGovern was a well-known leader in amateur sports. He was legal advisor to the United States Olympic Committee for many years, a former president of the Cornell University Alumni Association and president of the Sandlot Baseball Association. Almost from the inception of the USTA Umpire Association, he was a devoted tennis linesman. The McGovern Committee selects the winner of the John T. McGovern Award. The committee consists of all previous recipients of the award.
- Jr. McGovern Award - With qualifying conditions similar to the John T. McGovern Award, the Jr. McGovern Award recognizes service and excellence by younger tennis officials. The award winner is presented with a perpetual trophy and receives a silver-plated medal for his or her permanent possession. The McGovern Committee selects the winner of the Jr. McGovern Award. The committee consists of all previous recipients of the John T. McGovern Award.
- Jack Stahr Award - Awarded since 1984, the Jack Stahr Award is presented annually to an umpire, age 21 or over, who in one of his or her first three years at the US Open, is recognized for hard work, professionalism, technical ability and cooperative attitude. It recognizes his/her outstanding work primarily as a line umpire.
- Nicholas E. Powel Award - Given each year to a sectional chair or line umpire, the Nicholas E. Powel Award recognizes the importance of officiating at the local level. 1990
- Bill Talbert Junior Sportsmanship Awards - The Bill Talbert Junior Sportsmanship Awards are presented each year by the Board of Directors of the International Tennis Hall of Fame. Four recipients are selected by the USTA Awards Committee from nominations submitted by the 17 USTA sections. 1987
- USTA Girls' 18 National Championship Sportsmanship Award - The USTA Girls' 18 National Championship Sportsmanship Award is presented each year at the USTA Girls' 18 National Championships to the girl who, in the opinion of the committee of judges, exemplifies outstanding sportsmanship, conduct and character. since 1982
- Dr. Allen B. Stowe Sportsmanship Award - In 1957, shortly after the death of Dr. Allen B. Stowe, longtime director of the National Junior and Boys' Tennis Championships, a group of Kalamazoo, Mich., tennis enthusiasts sought to establish a fitting and lasting memorial to the former Kalamazoo College professor and tennis coach. The group contributed a sum of money for a trophy to be presented annually to the Junior Boys' 18 player who, in the opinion of the National Junior and Boys' Championships Committee, best combines the qualities of outstanding sportsmanship and outstanding tennis ability. The name and hometown of the recipient are inscribed on the trophy.
- Bobby Kaplan Sportsmanship Award - Presented annually at the USTA Boys' 16 National Championships, the Bobby Kaplan Sportsmanship Award is awarded to that boy who best combines sportsmanship and outstanding tennis ability. The award was first presented by the Eastern Tennis Association in 1978 shortly after the death of Mr. Kaplan, a prominent teaching professional on Long Island who devoted his career to junior tennis.
- Maureen Connolly Brinker Outstanding Junior Girl Award - The Maureen Connolly Brinker Outstanding Junior Girl Award was approved in February 1969 at the USTA annual meeting. The award, created by the Maureen Connolly Brinker Tennis Foundation Inc., is presented each year at the USTA National Girls' 18 Championships in San Jose, California, at the Almaden Valley Athletic Club.

The award and the foundation were the dream of the late Maureen Connolly Brinker. This award is presented each year to the girl player considered by the committee to have had the most outstanding full-season performance. She must be exceptional in ability, sportsmanship and competitive spirit. The silver bowl, which is kept at the Almaden Valley Athletic Club, is inscribed with the name of each year's winner. The recipient of the award receives a small engraved silver tray.

- Tennis On Campus Club of the Year Award - The USTA Tennis On Campus Club of the Year Award honors a Tennis On Campus programs/college club tennis team(s) for significant contributions made to the USTA Tennis On Campus program on their respective campus. Eligible applicants must be in good standing with their college or university and the USTA. The award(s) are distributed at the annual USTA National Campus Championships.
- Tennis On Campus Club of the Year Award - The USTA Tennis On Campus Club of the Year Award honors a Tennis On Campus programs/college club tennis team(s) for significant contributions made to the USTA Tennis On Campus program on their respective campus. Eligible applicants must be in good standing with their college or university and the USTA. The award(s) are distributed at the annual USTA National Campus Championships.
- Member Organization of the Year Award - The Member Organization of the Year Award was instituted in 1981 to recognize the services rendered to the USTA by its member organizations. Selection is made on the basis of service to the tennis community, service to the organization's members and service to the game of tennis. The program is decided on a two-tiered basis: 1) Each section selects its Member Organization of the Year. The selected organization shall receive an appropriate award emblematic of its selection. Once selected, that organization shall not be eligible for the sectional award for the following seven years. 2) Each section may nominate a candidate for the National Member Organization of the Year Award. Said nominee may be the sectional winner of that year or may be another organization of the section's choice. A section may submit any candidate for as many years as it wishes. The National Member Organization of the Year Award winner is announced at the USTA annual meeting.
- Tennis Facility Award - The Tennis Facility Awards Program honors outstanding tennis facilities and encourages excellence in future construction and/or renovation. Facilities must be under the jurisdiction of: (1) a parks and recreation department, (2) an educational institution or (3) an industrial complex. All facilities are judged in one of four categories, depending upon the number of courts and spectators accommodated. Since 1981.

=== Discontinued awards ===
- USTA Girls' Sportsmanship Trophy Award - The USTA Girls' Sportsmanship Trophy Award was presented annually at the close of the International Girls' 18 Grass Court Championships to the player in the championship who, in the opinion of the committee of judges, most nearly approaches the ideal in sportsmanship, appearance, court manners and tactics. The trophy was first presented in 1936 by the late Mrs. Harrison Smith and was henceforth awarded annually. The trophy was a sterling silver plate. The name of the recipient of the award was engraved on the trophy every year and a small silver plate similar to the trophy in design and engraving was given to the recipient. The award was retired in 2004 and donated to the International Tennis Hall of Fame.
- Harry Fogleman Memorial Trophy - The Harry Fogleman Memorial Trophy was awarded each year at the USTA Boys' 12 National Championships to the boy who, in the opinion of the Tournament Committee, exemplified outstanding sportsmanship, conduct, character and tennis ability. The award, a large pewter loving cup, was donated to the USTA by the 1973 Boys' 12 National Championships Committee at the Knoxville Racquet Club, Knoxville, TN, in memory of Harry Fogleman. Mr. Fogleman was not only an outstanding tennis coach but served on various committees of the USTA devoted to Junior development. For several years he was Tournament Director of the 12 and 14 National Championships in Chattanooga, TN. Before his sudden death in December 1972, he was honored as the 1972 recipient of the Tennis Educational Foundation Merit Award given annually by the USTA. The trophy was displayed by the club which hosted the Boys' 12 National Championships. The winner of the award was given a suitably inscribed pewter replica as a memento of his achievement. It was retired in 1989.
- Colonel James H. Bishop Award - The Colonel James H. Bishop Award was presented annually at a place and time determined by the USTA Junior Davis Cup Committee Chairman to that U.S. Junior Davis Cup squad member who, in the opinion of the chairman and the team captains, best exemplified the objectives of the Junior Davis Cup Program in regard to highest standards of character, conduct, sportsmanship, appearance, amateurism on and off the tennis court, and tennis accomplishment. The award, a sterling silver tray, was donated by Dorothy W. and Thomas E. Price to the USTA in memory of Colonel James H. Bishop—the founder of the Junior Davis Cup Program in 1937 (the forerunner of the Junior Wightman Cup Program in 1938) and a well-known and highly regarded friend of youth, educator, and tennis leader until his untimely death in 1961. The name of the recipient of the award was engraved on the tray and a suitably inscribed small silver replica was given to the recipient as a memento of the award. The last award in 1987 was to Patrick McEnroe.
- William M. Johnston Award - The William M. Johnston Trophy was awarded to that male player who, by character, sportsmanship, manners, spirit of cooperation and contribution to the growth of the game, ranks first in the opinion of the selection committee. Another basis for the award was the help a player renders not only to players in the recipient's own class but also to a lesser class and to junior players as well. The award was the result of a suggestion by the late “Little Bill” Johnston, who gave one of his championship cups to the International Lawn Tennis Club of the United States to be used for this purpose. The name of the winner of the award was engraved on the trophy, and a small silver tray suitably inscribed was given to the recipient as a memento of the award. It was awarded from 1947 through 2006.
- Sarah Palfrey Danzig Award - The Sarah Palfrey Danzig Trophy was awarded to that female player who, by character, sportsmanship, manners, spirit of cooperation and contribution to the growth of the game, ranks first in the opinion of the selection committee. Another basis of the award was the help a player renders not only to players of her own class but also to players of a lesser class and to junior players. The award was the result of a suggestion by the late Mrs. Danzig that it was fitting and proper that there should be an award for women comparable to and with the same criteria as the William M. Johnston Award for men. To that end, she gave one of her national championship cups to the International Lawn Tennis Club of the United States to be used for this purpose. The name of the winner was engraved on the trophy, and a silver tray suitably inscribed was given to the recipient as a memento of the award. Awarded from 1986 through 2006.

== See also ==
- American Tennis Association
- United States Professional Tennis Association
- History of tennis
