= Notting Dale (ward) =

Electoral ward in London, England

- Electoral ward for the Kensington and Chelsea London Borough Council
- Borough: Kensington and Chelsea
- County: Greater London
- Population: 9,139 (2021)
- Major settlements: Notting Dale
- Area: 0.5444 km²

Current electoral ward
- Created: 2014
- Councillors: 3

Notting Dale is an electoral ward in the Royal Borough of Kensington and Chelsea. The ward was first used in the 2014 elections and elects three councillors to Kensington and Chelsea London Borough Council.

== Geography ==
The ward is named after the Notting Dale area.

== Councillors ==
Election	Councillors		
2022	Mona Ahmed (Labour) (Independent since 2023)	Marwan Elnaghi (Labour)	Claire Simmons (Labour)

== Elections ==
=== 2022 ===
Notting Dale (3)
Party	Candidate	Votes	%	±%
Labour	Claire Simmons	1,200	68.4	−3.9
Labour	Mona Ahmed	1,180	67.3	−0.8
Labour	Marwan Elnaghi	1,162	66.2	−1.1
Conservative	Filippo Salamone	329	18.8	+1.5
Conservative	Mehreen Malik	314	17.9	+1.0
Conservative	Sasi Kamaladasan	300	17.1	+0.8
Liberal Democrats	Rosemary Somers	194	11.1	+6.0
Liberal Democrats	Philip Chenery	191	10.9	+1.7
Liberal Democrats	Yury Kanavalau	125	7.1	N/A
Turnout			30.6	
Labour hold		Swing		
Labour hold		Swing		
Labour hold		Swing		

== See also ==
- List of electoral wards in Greater London
