= Geoffrey Cannon =

English journalist and scholar (born 1940)

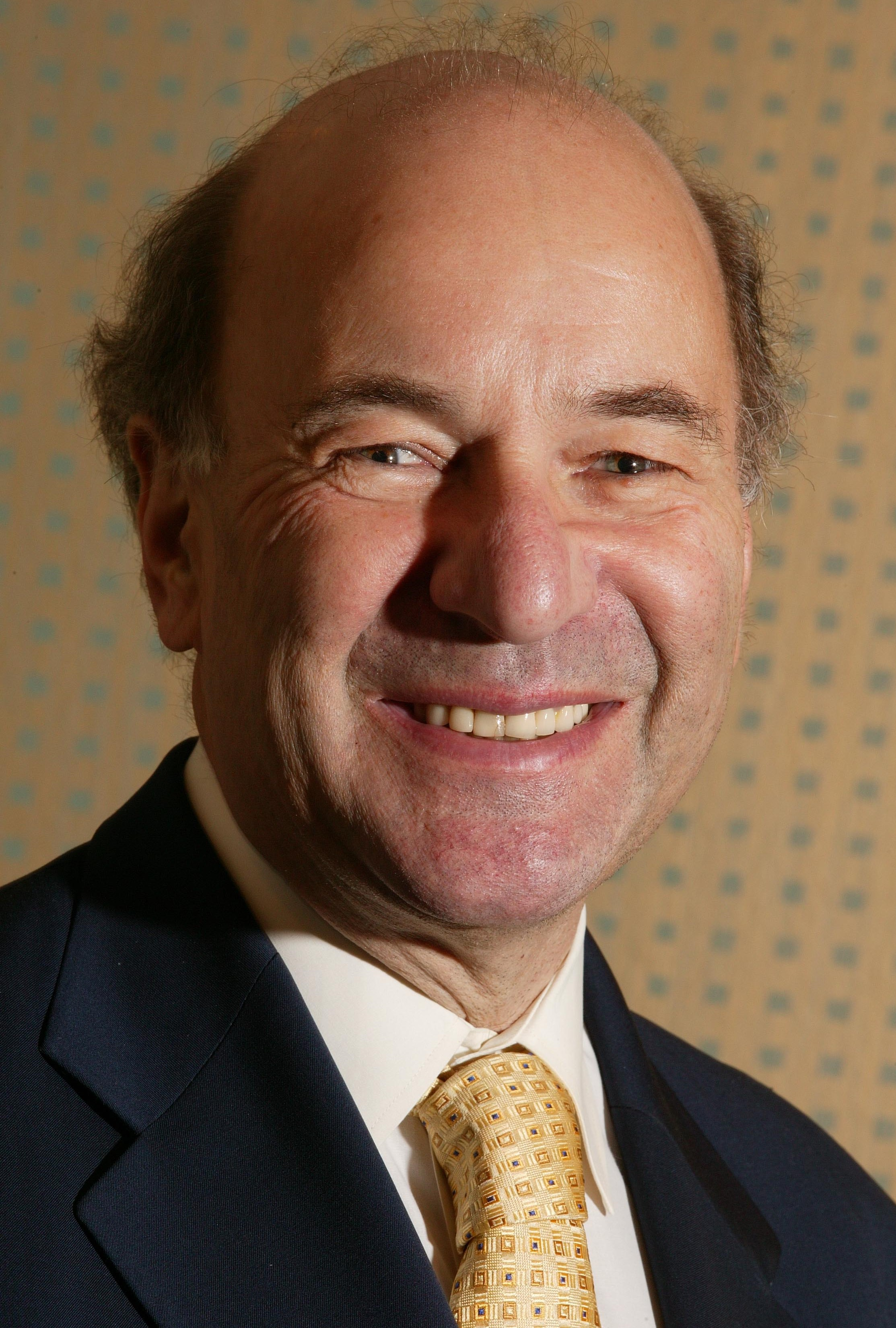
- Cannon in 2003
- Born: 12 April 1940 (age 86); Witham, Essex, England
- Education: Balliol College, Oxford
- Occupations: Editor, designer, writer, author
- Spouse(s): Antonia Mole 1961–1971 (divorced); Caroline Walker 1987–1988 (her death); Raquel Bittar de Oliveira 2004–
- Children: 4

Geoffrey Cannon (born 12 April 1940) is an English author, journalist and former magazine editor, and scholar. From 1968 to 1972, he was the music critic for The Guardian, a role that made him the first dedicated rock critic at a British daily newspaper. Having worked as the arts editor for New Society magazine, he became editor of the BBC publication Radio Times from 1969 to 1979. During that time, he also wrote on music and popular culture for The Listener, the Los Angeles Times, the Chicago Sun-Times, Creem, Rock et Folk, Melody Maker and Time Out.

Since the early 1980s, Cannon has worked in public health, mostly food and nutrition policy. He co-authored with Hetty Einzig, the bestseller Dieting Makes You Fat (1983), and with Caroline Walker, the bestseller The Food Scandal: What's Wrong with the British Diet and How to Put It Right (1984). Cannon's other books include The Politics of Food.

He is a former director of science for the World Cancer Research Fund and now lives in Brazil where he is a member of the Centre for Epidemiological Studies in Nutrition and Health (NUPENS), University of São Paulo, Brazil.

== Early years and education ==
Cannon won a scholarship to Christ's Hospital public school in Horsham in the county of Sussex. He subsequently attended Oxford University as an undergraduate at Balliol College.

He recalls that hearing Stravinsky's The Rite of Spring played loudly on a family friend's state-of-the-art hi-fi, at the age of fourteen, first enlightened him to the power of music. As further key events, he cites playing "Why Do Fools Fall in Love" in a record-shop listening booth in Horsham, and a year later "when a van came down a street in Essen, Germany, playing the demo of 'Heartbreak Hotel'".

== Career ==
=== Magazines, popular culture, music journalism ===
==== Oxford Opinion ====
At Oxford in 1960-1961, Cannon was editor and owner, with Stephan Feuchtwang, of Oxford Opinion (OO). Regular contributors included Richard Gott, John Gittings, British historian Timothy Mason, JG Farrell, Ian Hamilton, and Kevin Crossley-Holland. OO introduced the film commentary allied with Cahiers du Cinéma by Ian Cameron, Mark Shivas, VF Perkins, and others, who later founded Movie magazine. OO was described in The Times Literary Supplement as "incomparably the best produced of all Oxford magazines".

==== New Society, The Guardian ====
Cannon's first published writings on popular culture appeared in 1962 in New Society, where he was a founder-member of the editorial staff. He worked in-house for the magazine, later becoming its design, art, production, and arts editor. From 1967, he began writing on popular culture for, and redesigned, The Listener, under the editorship of Karl Miller, and in 1968 began writing a weekly column on pop and rock music for The Guardian. Along with Tony Palmer of The Observer, a Sunday newspaper, he was one of the leading figures in the emergence of British rock criticism during the late 1960s. George Melly, who became The Observer's first popular culture commentator in 1965, described the pair as seeking to "establish a critical apparatus" with which to evaluate contemporary popular music.

Helped by his association with The Guardian, Cannon was able to contribute more substantial articles to the Los Angeles Times and the Chicago Sun-Times, and to underground magazines such as Creem. He wrote the documentary film London Rock (1970), focusing on the UK's counterculture movement. He recalls that, together with Rolling Stone journalists David Dalton and Jonathan Cott, he joined Granada Television documentary-makers such as Jo Durden-Smith, John Sheppard and Michael Darlow in devising "prime-time networked shows designed as anthems of the revolution". Among these late-1960s projects, he says that the Johnny Cash at San Quentin TV special was his idea, and he "share[s] credit" for the ideas behind the concert films The Doors Are Open and The Stones in the Park. He also directed the film of Frank Zappa's performance at the 1970 Palermo Pop Festival, for RAI, Italy's national public broadcaster.

In July 1971, he was one of four speakers on "Youth and Music" at the inaugural International Music Industry Conference hosted by Billboard magazine. In his address, he discussed rock music's inspirational role on the lifestyle of contemporary youth and also its ability to provide "the catalyst for styles of death", with regard to the counterculture-related deaths of Sharon Tate in Los Angeles, Meredith Hunter at Altamont, and Weather Underground radical Diana Oughton.

Cannon says he was frustrated by The Guardian's habit of cutting down his submissions and stopped writing for the paper in 1972. In addition, he cites his lack of interest in contemporary musical trends – a perspective that was reflected in his being awarded "Pseud of the Year" by the satirical magazine Private Eye for two consecutive years. Later in the 1970s, he wrote what he considers some of his "best pieces" for Melody Maker and Time Out, when they were edited by Richard Williams.

==== Radio Times ====
In early 1969, Cannon became editor of Radio Times, which had a circulation of 3.8 million. Brian Gearing, his successor as editor, wrote: "Cannon arrived, backed by a young and talented staff … the changes he made were the most far-reaching ever to be introduced … At the end of the 1970s, Radio Times … was still Britain’s largest and most successful magazine." Elkan Allan, then editor of The Sunday Times Guide for Viewers, criticised Radio Times as containing “peripheral and tangential articles, frequently of a trivial nature”. In 1976, Radio Times and Cannon won Design and Art Direction Gold Awards for editorial design. Cannon left the magazine in 1979.

==== Running ====
Cannon wrote a monthly Fun Runner column for Running magazine from 1979 to 1987. He organised a team, including himself, to run the 1980 New York marathon. He then created London 1982/50, a group of 50 who trained for and ran the 1982 London marathon. As a result, four citizen running clubs were formed in different parts of London, including the Serpentine Running Club, which he co-founded.

=== Health, nutrition, and fitness ===
==== The Sunday Times, Dieting Makes you Fat ====
After his ten-year editorship of Radio Times, Cannon became an assistant editor of The Sunday Times. His focus on fitness resulted in regular coverage of the 'Getting in Shape' citizen running project, which he developed from Fun Runner ‘82, and in the 1982 New Year issue of The Sunday Times ran a feature by Cannon with the title ‘Dieting makes you fat’. With co-author Hetty Einzig, Cannon then wrote the book Dieting Makes You Fat, which became a UK number one best seller.

Cannon then discovered that an official report on the state of British nutrition and health had been delayed and allegedly suppressed, apparently because of its overall message, that the typical British diet was a main cause of many disabling or deadly conditions and diseases. Successive drafts of this report were leaked to him. The result was a Sunday Times front page lead news story and a full-page inside feature article. These articles won the Van den Berghs reporting Award for 1983.

Cannon left The Sunday Times in 1983.

==== New Health ====
In early 1984, he became editor of New Health magazine, published by Haymarket Press. From October 1984 until New Health closed in October 1986, Cannon wrote monthly columns, winning The Publisher’s 1986 best specialist columnist award. In 1985, he originated a six-part series on ‘Fat to Fit’, and in 1986 another five-part series on food additives, which won The Periodical Proprietors Association Award for best campaign of the year. Both series became books.

==== The Food Scandal ====
In 1984, with Caroline Walker, an English food campaigner and nutritionist who later became his second wife, Cannon wrote The Food Scandal, which became a UK best-seller. The Times ran three full-page features by Cannon derived from the book — "Food, treacherous food", "The cover-up that kills", and "So you think you eat healthily". Two chapters of The Food Scandal dealt with salt and sugar, both identified in the NACNE report as being consumed excessively. Brands containing these were named, including Bovril. In fact, it contained caramel, which in industrial form is not a variation of sugar. Beecham, then the owner of Bovril, sued and was granted an injunction in the High Court against the authors and publishers. In 1985, an updated and expanded paperback version was published. Cannon subsequently authored The Good Fight, a biography of Walker, who died from colon cancer in 1988.

==== The Politics of Food ====
Despite its portentous title, Cannon’s book The Politics of Food (1987) only explored how the food product manufacturing industry, undeterred by government and expert advisors, manipulated the food supply and thus what was consumed in the UK in the 1980s. It received mixed reviews. The Economist was sceptical, and Bernard Levin wrote in The Times: "What we eat and how we eat it is the next target for those who will not rest until they have compelled us, under the threat of prosecution, to do what they wish… The undoubted leader of the new species of fanatic is Mr Geoffrey Cannon." The book was serialised in The Independent, in 1987 winning the Argos Award for best newspaper feature, and in She magazine, winning the Publisher Award for best magazine feature.

In the late 1980s and into the 1990s, Cannon worked with professional and public interest civil society organisations. These included the London Road Runners Club, where he and colleagues devised the STAR*RANK (standards, records and ranking) age-graded system used in accredited road running races, and the Caroline Walker Trust, of which he was co-founder and secretary.

In 1985, he was a founder-member of the National Food Alliance (NFA), an umbrella group representing around 100 UK national bodies concerned with food, farming, and health, and its chair throughout the 1980s. The NFA subsequently turned into Sustain: the alliance for better food and farming. As such, he was the civil society member of the UK government delegation to the UN Food and Agriculture Organization/ World Health Organization 1992 International Conference on Nutrition, participating in preliminary meetings in Copenhagen and Geneva and the final meeting in December in Rome.

==== Superbug ====
While writing Caroline Walker's biography, Cannon discovered that in 1976 his late wife and co-author had been prescribed what would now be seen as a gross overdose of the toxic antibacterial drug co-trimoxazole. He became interested in antibacterial drugs in general and in 1991, supported by a Winston Churchill Travelling Fellowship, he interviewed various authorities. His resulting book Superbug was published in 1995. He concluded that the overuse and abuse of antibacterial drugs in human and animal medicine and rearing was evolving drug-resistant bacteria and already amounted to a catastrophe. The book had low sales. Its arguments are now backed by far more generally accepted evidence.

==== World Cancer Research Fund ====
In 1993, Cannon joined the World Cancer Research Fund, becoming head of science and head and director of the secretariat on behalf of WCRF of the 670-page report Food, Nutrition and the Prevention of Cancer: a Global Perspective, published in 1997. The method devised by the secretariat of assessing evidence as convincing, probable, possible, or insufficient was adopted by the World Health Organization.

=== Brazil ===
Cannon moved to Brazil in 2000 and is now resident there.

==== Federal Ministry of Health ====
In Brasília, he worked with Denise Costa Coitinho as consultant to the Coordenação Geral de Alimentação e Nutrição (CGAN, the department of food and nutrition) at the federal Ministry of Health. He compiled a report on Alimentos Regionais Brasileiros (regional Brazilian foods), issued in 2002. This describes and analyses many indigenous plant foods suited to Brazilian climate and terrain that are. not listed in food composition tables compiled in the temperate global North.

Cannon was a member of the official Brazilian government delegation to the 107th World Health Organization Executive Board meeting held in Geneva between 15 and 22 January 2001. From 2001, he drafted the first official national Brazilian dietary guidelines, the Guia Alimentar, the final version of which was published in 2006. This included recommendations for government, industry, health professionals, and the public. It stressed Brazilian food culture, foods of plant origin, and freshly prepared meals. The draft was cited by the World Health Organization as "giving equal priority to the prevention and control of nutritional deficiency, food-related infectious diseases, and chronic diseases".

==== The New World Map, The Fate of Nations ====
Cannon wrote two linked papers, developed from lectures given in Australia and New Zealand in April 2002. He proposed a return to the originally ancient natural philosophy of dietetics as the good life well led, of which food and eating is one part. He then wrote The Fate of Nations, subtitled "Food and Nutrition Policy in the New World", in which he proposed that the pressing need now was to conserve resources and the biosphere.

==== Out of the Box ====
From 2003 to 2009, he wrote a monthly column, "Out of the Box", for the journal Public Health Nutrition on topics of current interest and continued as a Public Health Nutrition deputy editor until early 2010.

==== The New Nutrition ====
In 2004, Claus Leitzmann and Cannon developed what became known as the "New Nutrition". They organised a workshop at the University of Giessen, Germany, where Cannon drafted, and the 23 members of the meeting agreed, The Giessen Declaration. This established ‘a set of agreed principles, definitions and dimensions for this new paradigm’. The Declaration defines nutrition as a social and environmental as well as a biological science. The workshop proceedings were published in a special issue of Public Health Nutrition in September 2005.

==== Public health for the 21st century ====
Cannon was invited by the Public Health Foundation of India to give the opening plenary lecture at an international conference in Hyderabad in August 2008 on the future of public health. Here he drafted the Hyderabad Declaration on Public Health in the 21st Century.

Brazil held the presidency of the World Federation of Public Health Associations (WFPHA) in 2009, and Cannon was a member of the Brazilian delegation to the 12th meeting in Istanbul. He drafted the WFPHA Istanbul Declaration: Health, the First Human Right.

Cannon continued working for the World Cancer Research Fund after moving to Brazil, mainly as chief editor of its second report, published in 2007, and of a separate policy report published in 2009. His work for WCRF ceased in 2012.

==== World Nutrition ====
In 2010, the World Public Health Nutrition Association launched a monthly online journal, World Nutrition. Cannon designed, edited, and wrote a monthly column and editorial for the journal, ceasing as editor in 2016.

==== NOVA, ultra-processing and the new Guia ====
In early 2009, Cannon as a deputy editor of Public Health Nutrition, invited Carlos Monteiro of the University of São Paulo to write a commentary whose title was ‘Nutrition and health. The issue is not food, nor nutrients, so much as processing’. In the USA, the thesis was immediately supported by Michael Pollan and by Marion Nestle. By 2012, the team led by Monteiro and now including Cannon, in consultation with investigators in other countries, developed the thesis into what became known as the NOVA classification. This divides all foods into four groups, according to the nature, extent and purpose of processing; unprocessed and minimally processed; processed culinary ingredients; processed foods; and ultra-processed foods. The team was in 2012 invited by the Brazilian federal Ministry of Health to draft the text of the second official national dietary guidelines. Published in 2014 in Spanish and English as well as Portuguese, these are based on the NOVA classification. Uruguay, Peru and Ecuador have also published national official dietary guidelines using the NOVA food classification, and they feature in a 2019 French official government report. Monteiro, Cannon and many other authors have published extensively on the NOVA system and its implications for nutrition, public health, society, economics and the environment.

In 2020, Cannon was among the most cited 1% of more than 600,000 investigators in 23 science disciplines throughout the world, based on Web of Science research engine findings. He was one of the 19 working in Brazil, four of whom came from Carlos Monteiro's department.

== Personal life ==
After graduating from Balliol, Cannon lived in the Bayswater, Hampstead and Battersea areas of London from 1961 to 1968 with his first wife Antonia and their three children, Benedict, Matthew and Lucy. He then lived in Notting Dale from 1968 to 1999. He married Caroline Walker in 1987; she died in 1988. He moved to Brazil in 2000. In early 2003, he moved to his wife Raquel Bittar's home city of Juiz de Fora in the state of Minas Gerais, where the couple now live with her son Tauá and their son Gabriel. In 2007, he told The Daily Telegraph: "Europeans regard death as the final obscenity, but in Brazil everyone is familiar with it... I don't think she [Raquel] would have married me if I hadn't been 'trained' in Brazilian life by Caroline's death. To live fully you have to embrace all of life's experiences."

== Publications ==
Cannon is author of seven books, editor of many reports, and author or co-author of more than 650 papers, commentaries, and profiles, including:

- Policy and Action for Cancer Prevention (2009). Policy report (chief editor). Washington DC: American Institute for Cancer Research/ World Cancer Research Fund. ISBN 978 0 9722522 4 9.
- Dieting Makes You Fat (2008). (New rewritten edition). London: Virgin. ISBN 978 1 9052 64261.
- Food, Health and the Prevention of Cancer: a Global Perspective (2007). Second report (chief editor). Washington DC: American Institute for Cancer Research/ World Cancer Research Fund. ISBN 978 0 9722522 3 2
- The New Nutrition Science (2005). (Chief writer, co-editor. with Claus Leitzmann.) Special issue of Public Health Nutrition. ISSN 1368-9800.
- The Fate of Nations, Food and Nutrition Policy in the New World (2003). Developed from the Caroline Walker Lecture given at the Royal Society. Caroline Walker Trust. ISBN 1 897820 17 8.
- Superbug. Nature’s Revenge (1995) London: Virgin. ISBN 1 85227 364 X.
- Food, Health and the Prevention of Cancer: a Global Perspective (1997). First report. (Director, chief editor). Washington DC: American Institute for Cancer Research/ World Cancer Research Fund. ISBN 1 899533 05 2
- The Good Fight. The Life and Work of Caroline Walker. (1989). London: Ebury. ISBN 0 7126 3808 3
- The Politics of Food (1987). London: Century. ISBN 0 7126 1210 6.
- Fat To Fit (1986). London: Pan. ISBN 0 330 29614 0.
- The Food Scandal (1985) (with Caroline Walker) (Expanded paperback edition). London: Century. ISBN 0 7126 0785 4.
- Dieting Makes You Fat (1983). (First edition, with Hetty Einzig). London: Century. ISBN 0 7126 0118 X.

Cannon's most-cited papers in academic journals registered by the Web of Science are published by Publons. Most of Cannon's public health papers, commentaries, and profiles are published on his ResearchGate page. Many of Cannon's rock music articles appear in Rock's Backpages.
