= Judy Levering =

American tennis executive (born 1938)

- Born: October 22, 1938 (age 87); Kansas City, Missouri, U.S.
- Education: Northwestern University
- Occupation: Tennis executive
- Spouse: Gordon Levering
- Children: 3

Julia Ade "Judy" Levering (born October 22, 1938) is an American former tennis executive who became the first woman to serve as the President of the United States Tennis Association, serving from 1998 to 2000.

Levering began her career in tennis as a volunteer in Lancaster County, Pennsylvania in the early 1980s. Throughout the 1980s and 1990s, she worked on numerous USTA committees and received the Service Bowl from USTA which is given "to the person who makes the most notable contribution to the sportsmanship, fellowship and service of tennis."

In 1997, she became the first vice president of the USTA, notably being involved in the creation USTA National Tennis Center and the naming of Arthur Ashe Stadium. She was elected the first female president in 1998. After her term expires, she planned to remain on the USTA board and on the International Tennis Federation's Committee of Management.

Since the end of her tenure, Levering has been involved in charitable endeavors. She founded the USTA Foundation to help make tennis more accessible and pairing it with inner city youth education programs.

She was born in Kansas City, Missouri and attended Northwestern University. She married Gordon Levering with whom she had three children: two daughters Laura and Julie, and a son, Tom. Levering often playing with her daughters in mother-daughter tournaments.
