= John Evans (19th-century writer) =

English miscellaneous writer

- Died: 1832
- Occupation: Writer

John Evans (died 1832) was an English miscellaneous writer.

== Life ==
Evans kept a school in his native city of Bristol for several years, first at Lower Park Row, and afterwards (by October 1815) at Kingsdown. During part of the time he officiated as a Presbyterian minister at Marshfield in Gloucestershire. He eventually removed to London, where he had a school in Euston Square.

== Works ==
Besides some schoolbooks Evans wrote:

- An Oration on the Doctrine of Philosophical Necessity considered in reference to its Tendency, 1809.
- The Ponderer, a series of Essays; Biographical, Literary, Moral, and Critical (originally published in the British Mercury), London, Bristol (printed), 1812; another edit., Essays, London, 1819.
- The Picture of Bristol; … including Biographical Notices of Eminent Natives, Bristol, 1814; 2nd edit., Bristol, 1818. An abridgment, entitled The New Guide, or Picture of Bristol, with Historical and Biographical Notices, was published as a "third edition", Bristol (1825?). The historical account of the church of St. Mary Redcliffe appeared in a separate form, Bristol, 1815.

Evans also edited, with a memoir, the Remains of William Reed of Thornbury, London, 1815, and compiled the second volume of The History of Bristol, Bristol, 1816, the first volume of which was written by John Corry.
