= Henry Chilver, Baron Chilver =

British engineer and politician (1926–2012)

The Right Honourable The Lord Chilver Kt. FRS FREng

Member of the House of Lords
- Lord Temporal
- Life peerage 14 July 1987 – 8 July 2012

Personal details
- Born: Amos Henry Chilver; 30 October 1926 Barking, Essex
- Died: 8 July 2012 (aged 85)
- Party: Conservative
- Spouse: Claudia Grigson (m. 1959)
- Relations: Christopher Grigson (brother-in-law); Wilfrid Grigson (father-in-law)
- Children: 2 daughters, 3 sons
- Education: Southend High School for Boys
- Alma mater: University of Bristol
- Occupation: Engineer; academic
- Scientific career
- Awards: Telford Medal – Gold; 1962
- Fields: Mechanical Engineering
- Institutions: University of Bristol; Corpus Christi College, Cambridge; University College London; Cranfield University
- Thesis: Thin-Walled Structural Members: a study of the strength of cold-rolled mild-steel sections with particular reference to the effects of local instability (1950)
- Doctoral advisor: Sir Alfred Pugsley
- Doctoral students: J. Michael T. Thompson (1962)

Academic offices

Chairman of the Universities Funding Council
- In office 1988–1991
- Chief Executive: Peter Swinnerton-Dyer

Vice-chancellor of Cranfield institute of Technology.
- In office 1970–1989
- Preceded by: First incumbent
- Succeeded by: Frank Robinson Hartley

Vice-president of Institution of Civil Engineers
- In office 1981–1983

Amos Henry Chilver, Baron Chilver (30 October 1926 – 8 July 2012) was a British engineer and politician.

== Early life and career ==
Chilver was born in Barking, Essex, to Amos Henry Chilver and his wife Annie E. Mack. After attending Southend High School for Boys, he took up a place at the University of Bristol, where he gained a BSc in Mechanical Engineering in 1947. He gained a PhD in Civil Engineering in 1951, and a DSc in 1962. From 1952 to 1954, he was a lecturer at the University of Bristol, and between 1958 and 1961 he taught at Corpus Christi College, Cambridge. Between 1961 and 1969, he was Chadwick Professor of Civil Engineering at University College London. Between 1970 and 1989 he was Vice-Chancellor of Cranfield University.

In the early 1980s, he was Chairman of the Northern Ireland Higher Education Review Group, which was tasked with producing a report called the Chilver Report on how to unify the Initial teacher education (ITE) used in Northern Ireland. He was the Chairman of the Post Office between 1980 and 1981. In 1983, he succeeded Lord Campbell as Chairman of the Milton Keynes Development Corporation (MKDC). Between 1992 and 1995 he was Chairman of English China Clays, and on 25 February 1993, he was appointed Chairman of RJB Mining. He has also been a director of ICI.

== Awards ==
He was made a Fellow of the Royal Academy of Engineering in 1977 and the Royal Society in 1982. In 1978 he was made a Knight Bachelor. He held honorary DScs from the University of Leeds (1982), the University of Bristol (1983), the University of Salford, the University of Strathclyde (1986), the University of Buckingham, the University of Bath (1986) and the University of Technology of Compiègne.

In 1987, he was made a life peer as Baron Chilver, of Cranfield in the County of Bedfordshire, and he was introduced to the House of Lords on 15 July.

== Personal life ==
In 1959 he married Dr Claudia Grigson, the sister of Christopher Grigson and they had five children: Helen, Sarah, John, Mark and Paul.

== Published works ==
- Problems in Engineering Structures with R S Ashby (1958)
- Strength of Materials with J Case (1959)

== See also ==
- University of Ulster – History

== Bibliography ==
- Clapson, Mark (2004). A Social History of Milton Keynes: Middle England/edge City. Routledge. ISBN 0-7146-5524-4.

Academic offices
New university	Vice Chancellor of Cranfield University; 1970–1989	Succeeded by Frank Robinson Hartley
