= Randy Gregson =

American tennis player and official

- Born: J. Randolph Gregson; December 11, 1918; Jonesboro, Arkansas, U.S.
- Died: May 23, 2010 (aged 91); New Orleans, Louisiana, U.S.
- Education: Arkansas State University; University of Texas at Austin
- Occupations: Tennis player and official

Randy Gregson (December 11, 1918 – May 23, 2010) was an American tennis player and official. He was the president of the United States Tennis Association from 1985 to 1986.

== Early life ==
James Randolph (Randy) Gregson was born on December 11, 1918, in Jonesboro, Arkansas. He attended Arkansas State University, where he played tennis, and he graduated from the University of Texas at Austin with a degree in petroleum engineering. During World War II, he served in the United States Navy in the Pacific. After the war, he moved to New Orleans, Louisiana.

== Career ==
Gregson became a successful amateur tennis player in New Orleans, where he joined the New Orleans Lawn Tennis Club (the oldest tennis club in the Americas) in 1948, and later in the region and the nation. For example, he won the U.S. Men's Clay Court Championships in singles and doubles for the 45s and 65s age divisions. He also won 25 Southern Championships in singles and doubles, including father-son doubles. He competed in the semifinals at the 1965 Wimbledon Championships in senior doubles.

Gregson served as the president of the United States Tennis Association from 1985 to 1987. During his tenure, he kept John McEnroe from competing in the Davis Cup on behavioral grounds. Gregson explained that he focused on good representation and teamwork on the U. S. team as opposed to star players. Gregson was also the president of the Louisiana Tennis Association and the Southern Tennis Association.

Gregson was inducted in the Southern Tennis Hall of Fame in 1987. He helped restore the tennis courts at the City Park and the Stern Tennis Center after Hurricane Katrina. He won the 2005 Dixon Award from the Louisiana Sports Hall of Fame.

== Death ==
Gregson died on May 23, 2010, in New Orleans, Louisiana, at the age of 91.
