= Sophie Grigson =

English cookery writer and celebrity cook (born 1959)

- Born: Hester Sophia Frances Grigson; 19 June 1959 (age 66); Broad Town, Wiltshire, England
- Occupations: Cookery writer; Celebrity cook
- Children: 2
- Parents: Geoffrey Grigson (father); Jane Grigson (mother)
- Relatives: Lionel Grigson (half-brother)

Hester Sophia Frances Grigson (born 19 June 1959) is an English cookery writer and celebrity cook. She has followed the same path and career as her mother, Jane Grigson. Her father was the poet and writer Geoffrey Grigson, and her half-brother was musician and educator Lionel Grigson.

== Life ==
Sophie Grigson was born in the village of Broad Town, near Swindon, Wiltshire, in 1959 and attended Oxford High School. From there she went on to study mathematics at UMIST, Manchester. After graduating in 1982 with a Bachelor of Science degree in mathematics (she was vice-president of the UMIST Alumni Association), she worked for a time as a production manager of pop videos for groups including Bonnie Tyler and the Style Council. Having inherited her mother's love of food, she found she also enjoyed writing about it. Her first food article, published in 1983 in the Sunday Express Magazine, was entitled "Fifty ways with potatoes". She has since written columns for publications including the Evening Standard (1986–93), the Sunday Times (1994–96) and The Independent (1997–98).

Grigson's television debut came in 1993 with the 16-part series Grow Your Greens, Eat Your Greens on Channel 4, which won the Caroline Walker Prize (Media Category). Her more recent television work includes Sophie Grigson in the Orient and Sophie Grigson in the Souk for Travel Channel.

She won the Guild of Food Writers Cookery Journalist of the Year Award in 2001 for her work in Country Living magazine. She is a keen supporter of organic and local food suppliers and is an advocate for decent children's food. She is a patron of the Children's food festival.

Sophie's Cookery School, based in Oxford, was the first dedicated pop-up cookery school in the country. She currently lives in Apulia in the south of Italy where she runs a small catering company, Trulli Delicious.

She was previously married to William Black, with whom she had two children.

== Bibliography ==
- Food For Friends (1987) Ebury Press
- Sophie's Table (1990) Penguin Books
- Book of Parties (1990, contributor) Sainsbury
- Sophie Grigson’s Ingredients Book (1991, nominated for the James Beard Award) Pyramid Books
- The Carved Angel Cookery Book (1992 with Joyce Molyneux) Grafton
- Eat Your Greens (1993) BBC Books
- Travels à la Carte (1994, with William Black) BBC Books
- Students' Cookbook (1993) Sainsbury
- Sophie Grigson’s Meat (1995) BBC Books
- Oxfam Fairworld Cookbook (1997, contributing editor) Cassell
- Taste of the Times (1997) BBC Books
- Fish (1998, with William Black) Headline
- Sophie Grigson's Herbs (1998) BBC Books
- Cooks For Kosovo (1999, contributing editor) Headline
- Feasts for a Fiver (1999) BBC Books
- Sunshine Food (2000) BBC Books
- Organic (2001, with William Black) Headline
- Complete Sophie Grigson Cook Book (2001) BBC Books
- Sophie Grigson's Country Kitchen (2003) Headline
- The First-time Cook (2004, reissued as The Student Cookbook, 2010) Collins
- Vegetables (2006, reissued as The Vegetable Bible, 2009) Collins
- The Soup Book (2009 reissued 2019, Contributing Editor) DK
- Spices (2011), Quadrille
- My Kitchen Table (2012) BBC Books
