= Christopher Grigson =

British naval architect and electronics engineer

Christopher William Baisely Grigson
- Born: 1 December 1926; Hoshangabad, India
- Died: 19 February 2001 (aged 74); Grimstad, Norway
- Education: Trinity College, Cambridge
- Occupations: Naval architect, electronics engineer
- Known for: Invention of scanning electron diffraction
- Spouse: Helle Bang
- Parent(s): Sir Wilfrid Grigson and Lady Phyllis Grigson
- Relatives: Claudia Chilver (sister)
- Awards: Fellow of the Royal Institution of Naval Architects

Christopher William Baisely "Grig" Grigson (1 December 1926 – 19 February 2001) was a British naval architect and electronics engineer who is credited with the invention of scanning electron diffraction.

== Early life and education ==
Grigson was born in Hoshangabad, India, to Sir Wilfrid Grigson, Deputy Commissioner of the Central Provinces and Berar, and his wife, Lady Phyllis Grigson. Grigson and his sister Claudia (who later married Henry Chilver) were both educated at a prep school in Sussex. While visiting his uncle and aunt in Cambridge he became ill with osteomyelitis of the hip, which left him bedridden for two years. Unable to leave, he was brought up by his uncle and aunt, and in 1946 won a place to study mechanical science at Trinity College, Cambridge. Despite still being ill he gained Firsts in both the Part I and Part II mechanical science triposes. After his health improved he took a PhD in electronics at Cambridge.

== Career ==
Grigson began to work at the university, becoming a demonstrator in 1953, and lecturer in 1957. During the 1950s he worked on the team of Charles Oatley developing the Scanning Electron Microscope (SEM), which is still used today. He became a Fellow of Trinity College in 1962, and in the same year married a Norwegian student at Bell School named Helle Bang. During a sabbatical year at Bell Laboratories in 1964–1965 he continued work on improving SEM technology. The scanning diffraction system that he developed for scanning transmission electron microscopes was known for many years as the "Grigson coil."

In 1968, he moved to Kristiansand, Norway to begin working at his father-in-law's naval firm, A/S Athene. He ran the company for several years from his father-in-law's death in 1974 until the company closed due to oil crises of the 1970s. After the business closed he worked as an independent consultant in hydrodynamics, including investigation of the sinking of the bulk ore carrier Derbyshire. In 1992 he and his family moved to Grimstad, and Grigson began lecturing at the University of Agder Engineering College, teaching hydrodynamics and basic physics. He published nearly 20 papers in the journal of the Royal Institution of Naval Architects before his death of cancer in Grimstad on 19 February 2001.

Grigson was a fellow of the Royal Institution of Naval Architects.

== See also ==
- Scanning electron microscope
- Charles Oatley
