= John Grigson =

British pilot

Jack Grigson
- Born: John William Boldero Grigson; 26 January 1893; Pelynt, Cornwall, England
- Died: 3 July 1943 (aged 50); Bulawayo, Southern Rhodesia
- Burial place: Harare (Pioneer) Cemetery, Zimbabwe
- Relatives: Geoffrey Grigson (brother); Kenneth Grigson (brother); Wilfrid Grigson (brother)
- Military career
- Allegiance: United Kingdom
- Branch: Royal Naval Volunteer Reserve; Royal Naval Air Service; Royal Air Force
- Service years: 1913–1943
- Rank: Air Commodore
- Nickname: Jack
- Commands: Rhodesian Air Training Group; British Air Forces in Greece; RAF in Palestine and Trans-Jordan; No. 2 (Indian Wing) Station; No. 55 Squadron RAF
- Conflicts: First World War; Russian Civil War; Second World War
- Awards: Distinguished Service Order; Distinguished Flying Cross & Two Bars; Mentioned in Despatches (2); Commander of the Royal Order of George I (Greece)

Air Commodore John William Boldero Grigson DSO, DFC** (26 January 1893 – 3 July 1943) was a highly decorated British pilot who served in the Royal Naval Air Service and Royal Air Force in World War I, continuing his service and serving in World War II until his death in an air crash in 1943.

== Early life ==
John Grigson was born in 1893 in the Vicarage at Pelynt, Cornwall, to Rev. Canon William Shuckforth Grigson M.A. and Mary Beatrice Boldero, and was one of seven brothers, including Geoffrey Grigson, Kenneth Grigson and Wilfrid Grigson. John was educated at St John's School, Leatherhead (along with his brothers) before joining the Royal Naval Volunteer Reserve as an Ordinary Seaman in February 1913.

== World War I ==
Grigson was serving aboard the armed merchant cruiser HMS India in the 10th Cruiser Squadron when the ship was sunk on 8 August 1915 and although he survived the loss news had not reached England before an announcement of his death appeared in The Times. She had stopped off at Helligvær, near Bodø, Norway to investigate a suspected blockade runner and was torpedoed by a U-boat SM U-22. India's sinking caused the deaths of 160 of her crew, the surviving 22 officers and 119 men were taken to Narvik.

In 1916 he transferred to the Royal Naval Air Service as a commissioned officer, and he was posted to HMS Ark Royal (1914), Britain's first aircraft carrier, in August 1917. Promoted flight sub lieutenant (Pilot) on 20 August 1916, he flew from Ark Royal and also from Royal Naval Air Service coastal stations including Great Yarmouth. Back aboard Ark Royal, he was promoted flight lieutenant on 31 December 1917. Following the formation of the Royal Air Force in April 1918, he was promoted temporary captain (Air) on 5 June 1918, and on 8 July 1918 appointed flight commander of No. 553 Flight, No. 221 Squadron RAF. The squadron had formed in Greece on 1 April 1918 from "D" Squadron of No. 2 Wing RNAS and was engaged in anti-submarine warfare on the Aegean Sea.

Grigson was awarded the Distinguished Flying Cross on 21 September 1918 (along with his observer Captain Oswald Gayford, whom he flew with for nearly a year), Their citation stated: "These two officers have flown together for a period of twelve months, during which time they participated in a number of bombing raids, carried out a large number of valuable reconnaissance patrols and escort flights in all weathers, by day and night, during the performance of which duties they have brought down hostile aircraft on several occasions. No task is too difficult for these officers."

== Post-war operations ==
Grigson was confirmed in his rank as captain (seaplane pilot) in December 1918. and went with No. 221 Squadron RAF to Russia in December 1918 to support White forces against the Bolsheviks. The unit was based at Petrovsk from January to 1 September 1919 when it was disbanded.

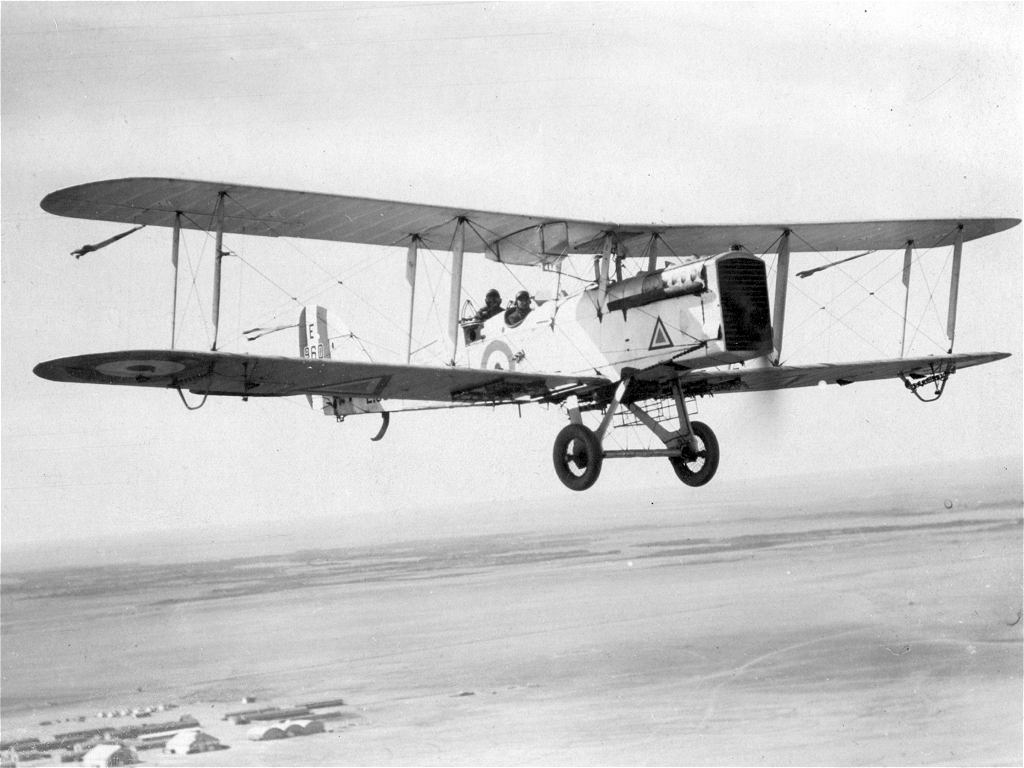
DH.9A

On 1 August 1919 he was granted a permanent commission with the Royal Air Force with the rank of captain, and taken on strength of No. 47 Squadron RAF in South Russia on 21 August 1919. The squadron had been sent to Southern Russia to help General Denikin's White Russian forces in their fight against the Bolsheviks in the Russian Civil War. While the RAF's ostensible mission was purely to provide training to Denikin's forces, No. 47 Squadron was included in the mission to carry out operational sorties. It was equipped with a mixture of aircraft, with flights equipped with Airco DH.9 and DH.9A bombers and Sopwith Camel fighters. The squadron's flights operated independently, carrying out bombing and strafing missions against Bolshevik forces.

He was awarded a Bar to his Distinguished Flying Cross on 22 December 1919, "in recognition of distinguished services rendered during the war and since the close of hostilities in South Russia" On 18 February 1920 he and Captain C. F. Gordon shot down an enemy operated Sopwith 1½ Strutter Grigson was Mentioned in Despatches on 31 March 1920. From February 1920 he commanded a flight of Airco DH.9s belonging to No. 55 Squadron RAF in Egypt. The Squadron reformed on 1 February 1920, when No. 142 Squadron, based at Suez was re-numbered. It started to receive Airco DH.9A aircraft in June 1920, and was equipped with a mixture of DH.9s and DH.9As when it transferred to Turkey in July to support British forces occupying Constantinople and the Dardanelles. Grigson had seen action in the Eastern Mediterranean, the Caspian, Egypt and Iraq.
He was awarded the Distinguished Service Order on 12 July 1920, 'for gallant and distinguished service' in Southern Russia.
No. 55 Squadron RAF moved to Baghdad in Iraq in September 1920 discarding its remaining DH.9s to standardise on the DH.9A, and was involved in missions against rebellious tribal factions and bands of nomadic bandits who attacked government or military personnel.

Grigson was awarded a Second Bar to his Distinguished Flying Cross on 28 October 1921.
The citation in the London Gazette read: "For gallant conduct and devotion to duty. This officer has always set a fine example to his flight by his courage and devotion to duty and by constant keenness and hard work.

== Between the wars ==
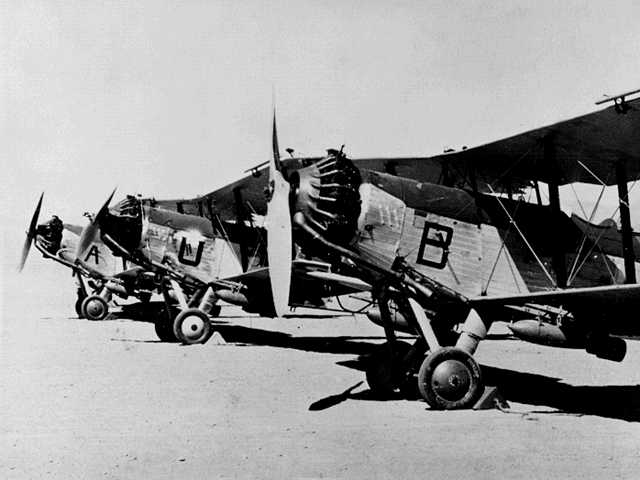
Westland Wapitis

Returning home he served as a flight commander with No. 205 Squadron RAF at RAF Leuchars he was posted to Seaplane Training School on 15 August 1922 and returned briefly to No. 205 Squadron RAF on 15 February 1923 before being appointed to command No. 420 (Fleet Spotter) Flight, Fleet Air Arm on 16 April 1923. Twelve months later he attended RAF Staff College, Andover, graduating in April 1925 to attend the School of Oriental Studies. Unsurprisingly, his next posting was to the Middle East as a staff officer with Intelligence at HQ Iraq Command from 28 October 1925. Still in Iraq, Grigson was promoted squadron leader on 7 November 1928, and posted as the commanding officer of No. 55 Squadron RAF on 21 March 1929, overseeing its ageing DH.9As being replaced by Westland Wapitis in February 1930.

From January 1930 Grigson attended the Imperial Defence College which prepared senior officers for high command and following his twelve-month course joined the Air Staff. He served with RAF Air Defence Great Britain until appointed to command No. 2 (Indian Wing) Station, Risalpur on 29 August 1935 having been promoted wing commander on 1 July 1935, Grigson returned to England in March 1937 for a period of leave and from 5 August 1937 briefly became staff officer at the RAF Directorate of Organisation before being appointed Maintenance Staff Officer at HQ Maintenance Command on 2 January 1938. He was appointed Senior Air Staff Officer at HQ No. 202 Group RAF Egypt and promoted group captain on 1 January 1939,

== World War II ==
Grigson was promoted temporary air commodore on 1 December 1940, and appointed Air Officer Commanding, Royal Air Force units in Palestine, and Trans-Jordan and then to Air Staff, British Air Forces in Greece to carry out an aerial survey of the country and identify suitable airfield sites, he later took over as Air Officer Commanding, HQ Eastern Wing. During the German invasion and the Battle of Greece he was appointed acting Air Officer Commanding, British Air Forces in Greece on 23 April 1941, after the situation in Greece had worsened and a decision was made to withdraw to the island of Crete. When on 23 April D'Albiac was finally ordered to withdraw Grigson assumed command of what was left of British Air Forces in Greece and was tasked with supervising the withdrawal of these units to Crete. His official report on these operations is an official record and is very detailed.

An often repeated story has him "standing on a badly bombed aerodrome in a pair of shorts, cursing at the attacking German aircraft and firing at them as they skimmed over, with rifles which an aircraftsman loaded and reloaded for him".

He was Mentioned in Despatches on 24 September 1941. and belatedly decorated by the Greek government as Commander of the Royal Order of George I with Swords on 12 March 1943.

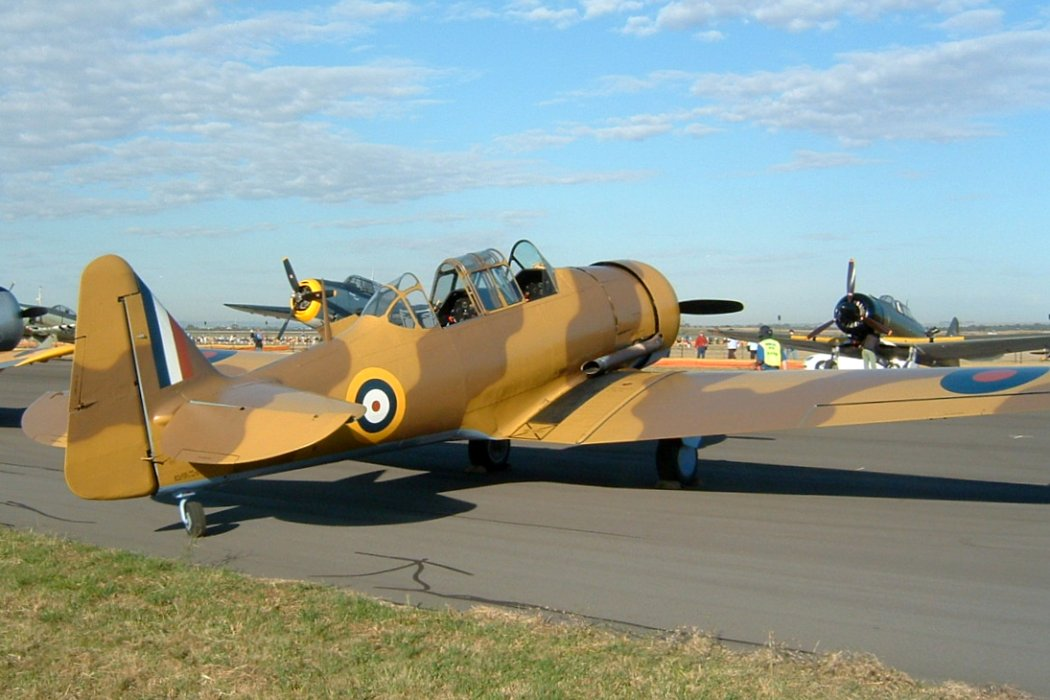
Restored Harvard II in RAF desert camouflage colours

The need for fully trained pilots, navigators, bomb aimers and air gunners was absolutely desperate at this stage of the war and Grigson was next posted as Senior Air Staff Officer to the Rhodesian Air Training Group working within the British Commonwealth Air Training Plan to complete aircrew training in nations not currently on the frontline. In 1943 he was appointed acting Air Officer Commanding for the Rhodesian Air Training Group.

== Death in Rhodesia ==
Grigson was killed on 3 July 1943 in the crash of North American Harvard Mark IIa (serial number "EX163") of No. 20 Service Flying Training School which crashed at Antelope Mine near Bulawayo, Southern Rhodesia (present-day Zimbabwe); he was aged 50. His grave is in Harare (Pioneer) Cemetery, Zimbabwe. His name is recorded on the war memorial in the village of Wherwell, and St John's School, Leatherhead.

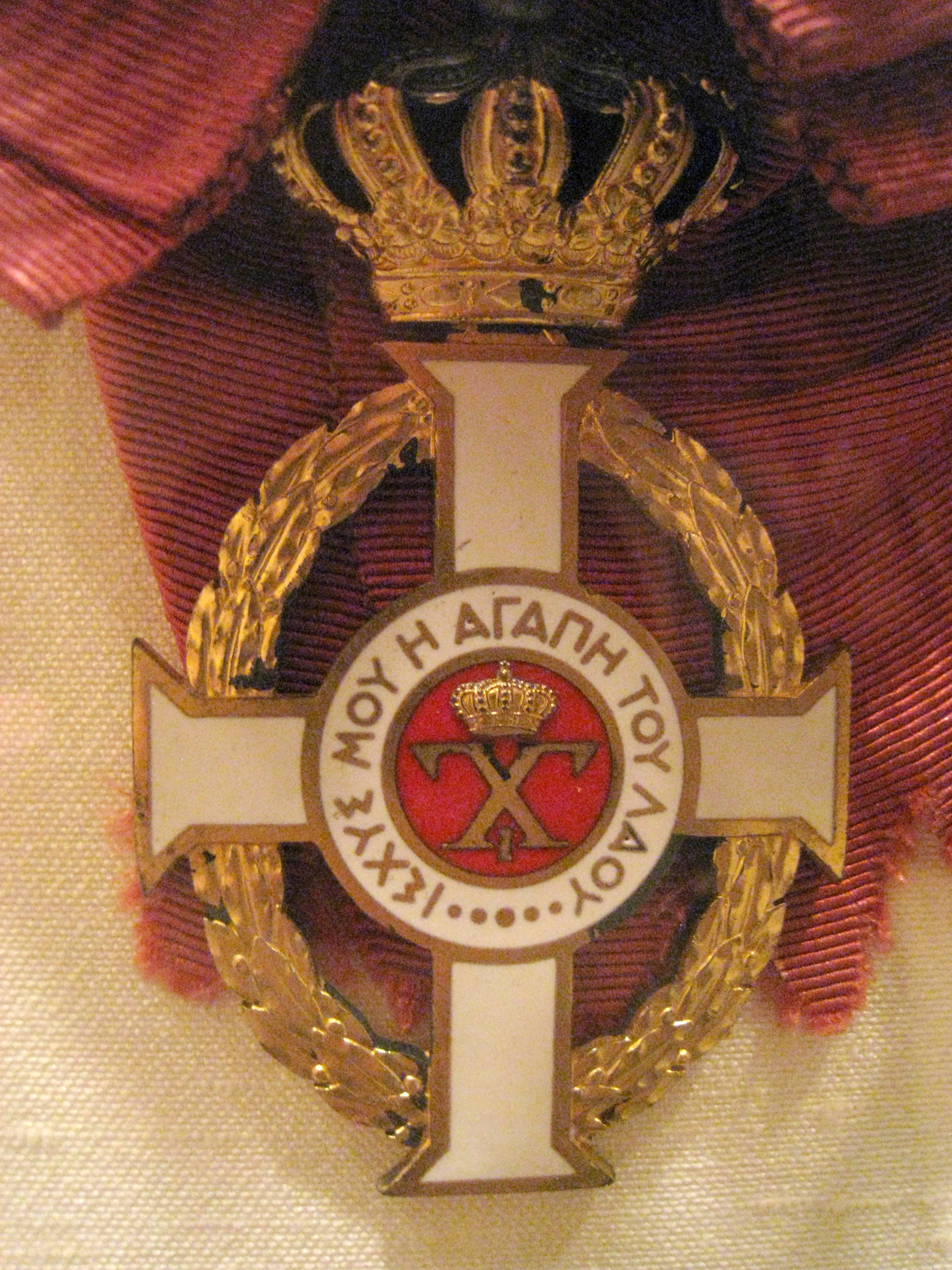
Badge of a Commander of the order

He was the husband of Mary Isabel Grigson, of Ottershaw, Chertsey, Surrey.

== Awards ==
- 21 September 1918 – Distinguished Flying Cross.
- 22 December 1919 – First Bar to the Distinguished Flying Cross.
- 31 March 1920 – Mentioned in Despatches.
- 12 July 1920 – Distinguished Service Order.
- 28 October 1921 – Second Bar to the Distinguished Flying Cross.
- 24 September 1941 – Mentioned in Despatches.
- 12 March 1943 – Commander of the Royal Order of George I with Swords.

== Bibliography ==
- Ashworth, Chris. Encyclopaedia of Modern Royal Air Force Squadrons. Wellingborough, UK:Patrick Stephens Limited, 1989. ISBN 1-85260-013-6.
- Chorlton, Martyn. "Battle Honours – 47 Squadron: Harassing the Italians out of East Africa". Aeroplane, November 2014, Vol. 42, No. 11. pp. 42–46.
- Halley. James J. The Squadrons of the Royal Air Force. Tonbridge, Kent, UK:Air Britain (Historians), 1980. ISBN 0-85130-083-9.
- Lewis, Peter. Squadron Histories: R.F.C, R.N.A.S and R.A.F. 1912–59. London:Putnam, 1959.
- Rogers, M. W. "Walter F Anderson Canadian Hero: The RAF in South Russia 1919–1920". Air Enthusiast, No. 117, May/June 2005. pp. 69–75.
- Yoxall, John. "No. 47 Squadron:History of a Famous Transport Command Unit". Flight, 8 April 1955, pp. 454–457, 468.
