= Wilfrid Grigson =

British civil servant (1896–1948)

Sir Wilfrid Vernon Grigson CSI (1896 – 26 November 1948) was a British soldier and civil servant.

== Biography ==
Wilfrid Grigson was born in 1896 in the Vicarage at Pelynt in Cornwall, south-west England, to Canon William Shuckforth Grigson and Mary Beatrice Boldero, and was one of seven brothers, including Geoffrey, Kenneth (1895–July 1918) and John (1893–1943). Five of the brothers died during the First and Second World Wars (the surviving brother being Geoffrey). Wilfrid Grigson was educated at St John's School, Leatherhead, in Surrey, before matriculating to Christ Church, Oxford.

During the First World War, Grigson served as a lieutenant in the Machine Gun Corps, serving in four different theatres of war.

After the war, he joined the Indian Civil Service and rose up through the ranks. At one point, while resident in Hyderabad State, his house was burned by people connected with the Razakars. The highest rank he achieved was serving as deputy commissioner of the Central Provinces and Berar. He was made a Companion of the Order of the Star of India in the 1945 New Year Honours, and in 1948 was knighted. On 26 November 1948, the plane he was travelling on crashed, killing all 16 passengers and five crew. An obituary was published in the journal Nature.

== Personal life ==
Grigson and his wife had two children: Christopher Grigson, a respected engineer naval architect, and Claudia, who later married Henry Chilver.
