= Notting Dale =

Area of Notting Hill, London, England

Coordinates: 51°30′53″N 0°12′37.43″W

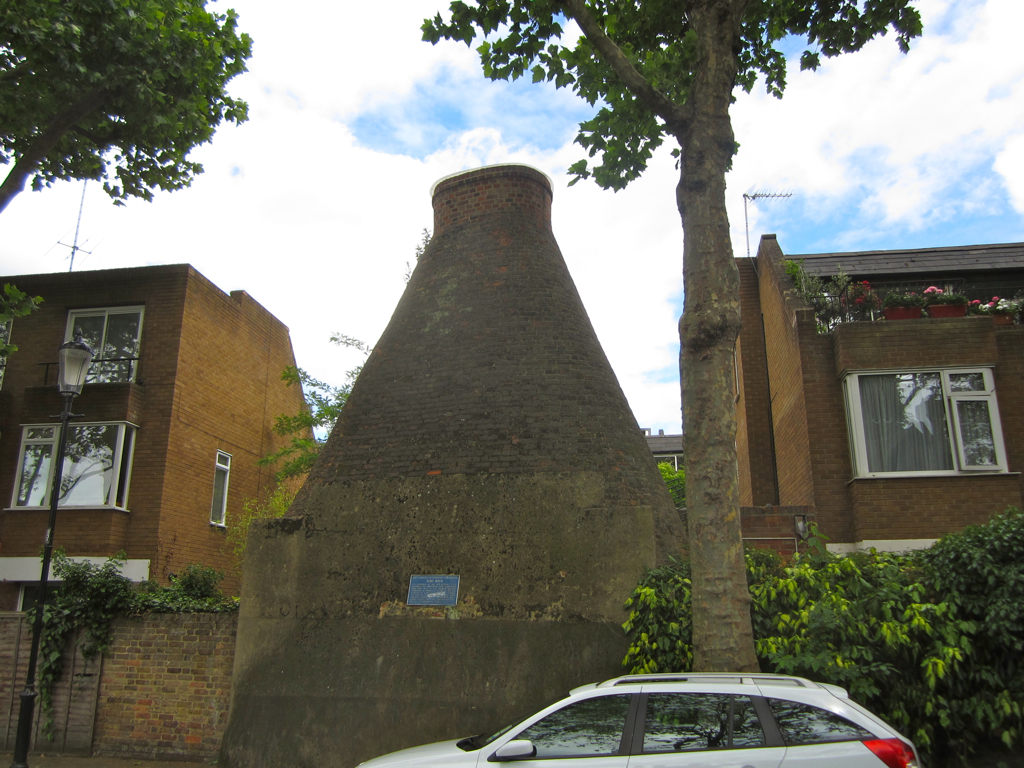
An old kiln on a street in Notting Dale

Notting Dale is a mainly residential enclave in the West London district of Notting Hill in the Royal Borough of Kensington and Chelsea. It has variously been associated with Irish, Catholic and Gypsy populations.

The site was formerly agricultural land belonging to two farms, Notting Barns and Portobello, together covering 400 acres (160 hectares). The area then went through several industrial stages, such as pottery, before becoming overrun with pig farming and other "noxious" trades, all of whom were required to move out from their former inner city locations. This gave rise to area's nickname of "The Pigs and the Potteries". The area became known for appalling living conditions; in the mid-19th century, it fell into disuse and disrepair. By the late 19th century Notting Dale began to be developed for residential purposes, and also became known for its Irish Gypsy community. It is now home to a mix of public and private housing.

== Governance ==
Notting Dale is part of the Kensington and Bayswater constituency for elections to the House of Commons of the United Kingdom, represented by Labour MP Joe Powell since 2024.

Locally, Notting Dale is part of Kensington and Chelsea London Borough Council. It is part of the Notting Dale ward for elections to the council Kensington and Chelsea London Borough Council.
