= Caroline Walker (food campaigner) =

British nutritionist, writer, author and campaigner (1950–1988)

Caroline Leoni Walker
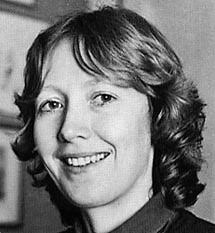
- Born: 12 June 1950; Liss, Hampshire, England
- Died: 22 September 1988 (aged 38)
- Education: Queen Elizabeth College (now King's College London) and London School of Hygiene and Tropical Medicine. BSc, MSc
- Known for: Food campaigning
- Awards: Woman of the Year, 1985 Winston Churchill Travelling Scholarship, 1987 Rosemary Delbridge Memorial Trust Trophy (posthumous), 1989
- Scientific career
- Fields: Nutritionist, campaigner, journalist, author
- Workplaces: Elsevier Scientific Publishing, 1973, 1975 MRC Epidemiology Unit, Cardiff, 1978–1980 MRC Dunn Clinical Nutrition Centre, Cambridge, 1980–1982 Nutritionist, City and Hackney Health Authority, 1983–1984 Nutrition director, City and Hackney Stroke Prevention Programme, 1984–1985

Caroline Walker (12 June 1950 – 22 September 1988) was a British nutritionist, writer, author and campaigner for better food, who died from cancer aged 38. After her death, the Caroline Walker Trust was established with a mission to "improve public health by means of good food".

At the 2019 annual Evening of Celebration for Walker and of the trust held at the Royal Society of Medicine in London, speaker Felicity Lawrence of The Guardian, a friend and colleague of Walker, said "She was the lodestar for campaigning around food and social justice that has guided me, and influenced countless others, ever since… She had a unique combination of erudition and academic ability with human warmth, and a gift for popular communication. She was a great phrase-maker, and a witty story-teller… She could simplify to communicate because she had such deep understanding of the science behind her subject. That was rare. And precious".

== Early life and education ==
Caroline Walker was born in Liss, Hampshire and educated at Cheltenham Ladies College. In 1972, she graduated with a BSc degree in biology from Queen Elizabeth College (now part of King's College, London) and then did a postgraduate degree in human nutrition at the London School of Hygiene and Tropical Medicine, where her supervisor was John Waterlow. Her MSc thesis, completed in 1978, rated first class with a distinction, was on the relationship between poverty, food and health.

== Early career ==
In 1968–69, for a year after she left school, she was a teacher at the Convent of Nazareth, Haifa, Israel, living with Arab families. In 1973–75 she worked as an editor at Elsevier Scientific Publishing in Amsterdam. In the period immediately before and during the 1973 October War she went back to Israel and became committed to the Palestinian cause.

Back in Britain as from the mid-1970s her commitment became and remained focused on the politics of food, as she associated with the Agricapital group, which examined food production and health, for example producing a critique of the UK bread industry, alongside the Politics of Health Group. Both groups researched and debated the science and politics of food, nutrition, health, production and consumption. They were shaped by the British Society for Social Responsibility in Science (BSSRS), set up in the late 1960s by distinguished scientists. BSSRS was based, as was Friends of the Earth (FoE), in Joseph Rowntree Foundation funded offices at 9 Poland Street, near Soho, London. She maintained links with BSSRS and FoE friends and colleagues for the rest of her life. Thus, she became a board member of the London Food Commission (LFC), a think-tank on food, health, society and economy created by the Greater London Council (1984–90), on which she remained until her death. A number of people from Agricapital and the Politics of Health Group were on the 15 person staff of the LFC or its 50-person board, such as Eric Brunner, Michael Joffé, Tim Lang, Tim Lobstein, and Aubrey Sheiham.

From 1978 to 1980, she worked at the Medical Research Council (MRC) Epidemiology Unit in Cardiff, working to Peter Elwood, then in 1981–1982 moved to the Dunn Clinical Nutrition Centre in Cambridge, working to Philip James. Her work at the Dunn Centre included a field study designed to see whether high blood pressure was linked with high salt consumption, for which she experimented on herself, adding sodium chloride and lithium to her diet. She then made a critical review of the state of the scientific literature on diet and major chronic diseases in Europe, starting with heart disease. She corresponded directly with researchers in 26 countries.

From 1983 to 1985 she worked as a community nutritionist for City and Hackney Health Authority, working to Ken Grant, in charge of the heart and stroke prevention programme. She published papers on "Poverty by administration" (based on her MSc thesis), "The national diet" and "The new British diet". She became a pithy and pointed broadcaster, author and journalist, publicising the effects of good diet on well-being and good health, and poor diet on disagreeable, debilitating and deadly conditions and diseases. She was a regular contributor to BBC Radio 4's The Food Programme. Presenter Derek Cooper recalled in 1995 ‘She cried out against the debasement of our diet with such wit that even her victims must have thought she was rather wonderful’.

== The Food Scandal ==
In 1984, Walker co-authored with Geoffrey Cannon, who would later become her husband, The Food Scandal: What's Wrong with the British Diet and How to Put it Right. With special support from publisher Gail Rebuck it became a UK number one bestselling book. It contradicted the Department of Health's official 1981 statement that "Nutrition in Britain is generally good". The background to the book was the official NACNE (National Advisory Committee on Nutrition Education) report on the British diet, of which Philip James was convenor and chief author. NACNE was a committee of physicians and nutrition scientists commissioned by the British government to produce a report on food and health in the UK. Walker was the committee's honorary Secretary. The report was delayed and widely believed to have been suppressed for two and a half years, after lobbying from the food manufacturing industry and its representative organisations. Walker was incensed: ‘The less well off, the less well informed, the disadvantaged, would continue in ignorance to depend on diets which could eventually destroy their health.

NACNE's existence became public knowledge initially in a sensational front page lead news story by Geoffrey Cannon in The Sunday Times in June 1983. When the report finally appeared, its message was that the British would be much healthier if their diet contained less fat and sugar. The Food Scandal took the findings of the NACNE report and popularised them for a general audience. It "challenged the unholy trinity of British processed food: saturated fat, commercial sugar, added salt. It was rude about specific branded products”. Walker said “as a general rule, the more heavily a food is advertised, the worse it is liable to be for your health”.

Prefiguring Michael Pollan, Walker and Cannon argued that the "basic message about food and health" could be stated in one sentence: "For good health, eat whole, fresh food; and prefer food of vegetable origin." The book pointed out how far the British diet had departed from this message, noting for example that since the 1950s the British ate half as much porridge and twice as much packaged sweetened breakfast cereal. Walker and Cannon also noted that the British ate a "miserable 2 1/2 ounces of fresh fruit" per day and just 4 ounces of fresh vegetables. "Think what that might look like: the odd onion, a couple of carrots, a few sprouts. The Food Scandal also exposed adulterations, such as the addition of water to sausages and bacon; the use of cosmetic food additives – colours and flavours; and the prevalence of mechanically recovered meat in the British food supply. Walker said in a Granada TV special on The Great Food Scandal: "Under the new 1984 regulations meat products can now include entrails, eyeballs, snout, hide, hair, lips".

In June 1984 Walker and Cannon and the publisher were sued by Beechams for a mistaken statement in The Food Scandal that its product Bovril paste contained sugar (the type of caramel included to give a meaty colour, is not a form of sugar) and Beechams won an injunction in London's High Court. The book was withdrawn, reprinted and republished. An expanded and updated paperback edition was published in 1985.

== Later career ==
In his biography The Good Fight. The Life and Work of Caroline Walker, her husband Geoffrey Cannon summarised the work she did in the brief years that remained to her. The book contains a full list of her work. He wrote:

In less than a year, between July 1985 and April 1986, the enlarged paperback edition of The Food Scandal was published; she was advisor to the BBC TV Food and Health campaign, and also to Granada TV and Thames TV, for a total of over thirty nationally networked programmes; wrote or co-wrote six booklets most of which accompanied television series, requested by a total of half a million viewers; was a Woman of the Year; advised and guided the Coronary Prevention Group, the London Food Commission and New Health magazine; co-founded the Food Additives Campaign Team, wrote a chapter for Additives: Your Complete Survival Guide, and shared the Periodical Publishers' Association prize for Campaign of the Year. She also lectured up and down the country, often to small groups, and wrote letters of encouragement to people who heard her and asked her for advice.

In January 1985 Caroline Walker was diagnosed with colon cancer; by 1987, her condition worsened. Towards the end of her life, she talked about a trust to be set up in her name to continue her work.

== Death ==
Lead obituaries were published in UK national newspapers. John Rivers of the School of Hygiene and Tropical Medicine wrote in The Independent: “Caroline Walker was a radical who, by her passionate arguments, made market forces achieve her end’’. Felicity Lawrence wrote in The Daily Telegraph, for which Caroline was a columnist: “She was… a scientist who was able to convey complex information in layman’s terms and with great wit”. Philip James, then of the Rowett Research Centre, Aberdeen, wrote in The Guardian: “Where will we find a successor to this young, engaging, warm and immensely effective campaigner?”.

The distinguished nutrition scientist Hugh Sinclair gave the address at Caroline's memorial service, and said "We cannot replace Caroline’s contribution to nutrition. But so many of us will always treasure the privilege of having known her and admire her immensely brave struggle against adversity".

Her final Food Programme broadcast on her life, work and hopes, made from her bed a month before she died, transmitted at the end of August in time for her to hear it, won the Glenfiddich prize for radio programme of the year in 1989.

== The Caroline Walker Trust ==
The Caroline Walker Trust was established in 1989 and is still in existence. Its work has included producing reports on nutritional guidelines, and at its annual Evening of Celebration it features presentations by distinguished speakers and gives awards to those who have most successfully supported public health by means of good food (Caroline Walker Award winners have included Joanna Blythman, Sheila Dillon and Sophie Grigson). The Trust has also mounted an annual keynote lecture on public health and nutrition (Caroline Walker Lecturers have included Michael Marmot, James Goldsmith, Suzi Leather, Colin Tudge, Geoffrey Cannon and Jonathon Porritt). Most lectures were published by the trust and can be downloaded free of charge. The trust won the Derek Cooper Award in the BBC Food and Farming Awards in 2006. In her presentation at the trust's 2019 Evening of Celebration, Felicity Lawrence said: “Caroline would be thrilled to see this room full of young people working in the public interest, carrying on the good fight that she began”.
