= Geoffrey Grigson =

English poet, writer, critic and naturalist (1905–1985)

- Born: Geoffrey Edward Harvey Grigson; 2 March 1905; Pelynt, Cornwall, England
- Died: 25 November 1985 (aged 80); Broad Town, Wiltshire, England
- Education: St John's School; St Edmund Hall, Oxford
- Occupations: Poet, essayist, editor, critic, anthologist and naturalist
- Children: 4, inc. Lionel Grigson; Sophie Grigson
- Relatives: John Grigson (brother); Wilfrid Grigson (brother); Giacomo Benedetto (grandson)
- Writing career
- Pen name: Martin Boldero
- Notable awards: Duff Cooper Prize

Geoffrey Edward Harvey Grigson (2 March 1905 – 25 November 1985) was a British poet, writer, editor, critic, anthologist and naturalist. In the 1930s, he was editor of the influential magazine New Verse, and went on to produce 13 collections of his own poetry, as well as compiling numerous anthologies, among many published works on subjects including art, travel and the countryside. Grigson was in 1946 a co-founder of the Institute of Contemporary Arts. His autobiography The Crest on the Silver was published in 1950. At various times, Grigson was involved in teaching, journalism and broadcasting. Fiercely combative, he made many literary enemies.

== Life and work ==
Geoffrey Grigson was born at the vicarage in Pelynt, a village near Looe in Cornwall, England. His childhood in rural Cornwall had a significant influence on his poetry and writing. As a boy, his love of objects of nature (plants, bones and stones) was sparked at the house of family friends at Polperro who were painters and naturalists. He was educated at St John's School, Leatherhead, and at St Edmund Hall, Oxford.

=== Poet and editor ===
After graduating from Oxford University, Grigson took a job at the London office of the Yorkshire Post, from where he moved on to become literary editor of the Morning Post. He first came to prominence in the 1930s as a poet, then as editor from 1933 to 1939 of the poetry magazine New Verse. Among important works by many influential poets — notably Louis MacNeice, Stephen Spender, Dylan Thomas, W. H. Auden, Paul Éluard and Grigson himself — New Verse featured concrete poetry by the sculptor Alberto Giacometti (translated by David Gascoyne) and folk poetry from tribal villages of the Jagdalpür Tahsil district of Bastar State, Chhattisgarh, transcribed from the Halbi language by Grigson's brother Wilfrid Grigson. During this period, Grigson published some of his own poetry under the pseudonym Martin Boldero. An anthology of poems that appeared in the first 30 issues of New Verse was published in hardback by Faber & Faber in 1939, and re-published in 1942; the second edition states that the first "came out on the day war was declared".

During World War II, Grigson worked in the editorial department of the BBC Monitoring Service at Wood Norton near Evesham, Worcestershire, and as a talks producer for the BBC at Bristol.

=== Critic and author ===
Grigson was a noted critic, reviewer (for the New York Review of Books in particular), and compiler of numerous poetry anthologies. He published 13 collections of poetry, and wrote on a variety of subjects, including the English countryside, botany, travel, and especially art –– with books on Wyndham Lewis, Henry Moore, and most notably, Samuel Palmer.

In 1946, Grigson was one of the founders of the Institute of Contemporary Arts (ICA) in London, together with Roland Penrose, Herbert Read, Peter Watson and Peter Gregory.

In 1951, to coincide with the Festival of Britain, Grigson was General Editor of the 13-volume About Britain series of regional guidebooks published by William Collins. In the same year, Grigson curated an exhibition of drawings and watercolours drawn from the British Council Collection, which for three decades toured worldwide to 57 art galleries and museums. The works displayed included those of John Craxton, Barbara Hepworth, Augustus John, Wyndham Lewis, Henry Moore, Paul Nash, Ben Nicholson, John Piper, and Graham Sutherland.

=== Champion and scholar of Samuel Palmer ===
Grigson's Samuel Palmer: The Visionary Years (1947), an aptly poetic chronicle of the artist's early life influences and experiences, which contained 68 photo illustrations, introduced to a broad audience the early works of one of England's greatest Romantic painters. Grigson's follow-up, Samuel Palmer's Valley of Vision (1960), included a selection of the artist's own writings and an additional 48 plates. Both books featured a number of previously unpublished paintings, drawings, and sketches. They established Grigson as the foremost authority on Palmer's revered "Shoreham Period", and helped trigger a surge of interest in Palmer's youthful, ecstatic, fantastical depictions (during a time of post-war riots and Industrial Revolution) of Nature's abundance, in an idyllic Kentish countryside.

Controversially, these books also caught the attention of famous art forger Tom Keating, who used their illustrations as models for a series of Palmer fakes that he did in the 1960s and '70s. In 1976, along with Palmer experts from the Ashmolean, Fitzwilliam, Tate, and British Museums, Grigson helped Times reporter Geraldine Norman confirm that 13 suspect Palmers that had come on the market over the previous decade were forgeries. At Keating's 1979 art fraud trial at the Old Bailey, in his searing testimony on the credulity of the Bond Street art merchants who bought and sold some of the fake Palmers, contentious art critic Brian Sewell referred to a personal letter in Grigson's The Visionary Years that made ridiculous a key element of the provenance they had proffered, much to the delight of Keating's defence barrister.

In the catalogue for a major retrospective held by the British Museum and The Metropolitan Museum of Art on the bicentenary of Palmer's birth (2005), Colin Harrison, curator at the Ashmolean Museum, in his essay on the artist's rediscovery, credited Grigson's 1947 book with effectively establishing a canon of Palmer's early work.

=== Final years ===
Grigson was the castaway featured in an edition of Roy Plomley's Desert Island Discs on BBC Radio 4 first broadcast on 16 October 1982. In 1984, Grigson was interviewed by Hermione Lee in an edition of Channel 4's Book Four.

Grigson in his later life lived partly in Wiltshire, south-west England, and partly in a cave house in Troo, a troglodyte village in the Loir-et-Cher département in France, which features in his poetry. He died in 1985 in Broad Town, Wiltshire, where he is buried in the churchyard of Christ Church.

== Family ==
Born in 1905, Grigson was the youngest of seven sons of Canon William Shuckforth Grigson (1845–1930), a Norfolk clergyman who had settled in Cornwall as vicar of Pelynt, and Mary Beatrice Boldero, herself the daughter of a clergyman. The inscription on his father's slate headstone in Pelynt Churchyard is the work of Eric Gill, 1931. Five of Grigson's six brothers died serving in the First and Second World Wars, among them John Grigson. This was one of the highest rates of mortality suffered by any British family during the conflicts of the 20th century. Grigson's surviving brother, Wilfrid Grigson, was killed in an air crash in 1948 in Pakistan, where he was serving as a post-Partition official.

Geoffrey Grigson's first wife was Frances Franklin Galt (who died in 1937 of tuberculosis). With her, he founded the poetry magazine New Verse. They had one daughter, Caroline (who married designer Colin Banks). With his second wife, Berta Emma Kunert, Grigson had two children, Anna and Lionel Grigson. Following divorce from his second wife, Grigson married Jane Grigson, née McIntire (1928–90). Their daughter is Sophie Grigson. Among Grigson's grandchildren is the political scientist Giacomo Benedetto.

== Honours and legacy ==
Described in 1963 by G. S. Fraser as "one of the most important figures in the history of English taste in our time", Grigson was awarded the Duff Cooper Prize for his 1971 volume of poetry Discoveries of Bones and Stones. A collection of tributes entitled Grigson at Eighty, compiled by R. M. Healey (Cambridge: Rampant Lions Press), was published in 1985, the year of his death. In 2005, to mark the centenary of Grigson's birth a conference was held at St Edmund Hall, Oxford.

In 2007, Pallant House Gallery in Chichester presented the exhibition Poets in the Landscape: The Romantic Spirit in British Art. The exhibition explored "the creative links between poetry, the pastoral vision and British art in the work of Romantic artists of the 18th and 19th centuries, and the Neo-Romantic artists of the mid-20th century", with exhibits of Grigson's anthology The Poet's Eye, featuring lithographs by John Craxton, and copies of New Verse.

In 2017, the British Museum presented a major exhibition of British landscape paintings from the century following the death of J. M. W. Turner. The exhibition title was "borrowed from the poet and critic Geoffrey Grigson's 1949 collection of essays Places of the Mind", and, in doing so, "acknowledges how every landscape drawing is a construct of the mind and imagination of its creator".

== Works ==
- The Arts To-day (John Lane The Bodley Head, 1935), editor.
- Several Observations (Cresset Press, 1939), poems.
- Under the Cliff, and Other Poems (Routledge, 1943).
- Henry Moore (Penguin, 1944).
- Visionary Poems and Passages or The Poet's Eye (Frederick Muller, 1944), editor. Lithographs by John Craxton.
- Wild Flowers in Britain (William Collins, 1944).
- The Isles of Scilly and Other Poems (Routledge, 1946).
- The Mint: a Miscellany of Literature, Art and Criticism (George Routledge & Sons, 1946).
- Before the Romantics: an Anthology of the Enlightenment (Routledge & Sons, 1946), editor.
- Samuel Palmer: the Visionary Years (Kegan Paul, 1947).
- Wild Flowers in Britain (Collins, 1947).
- John Craxton. Paintings and Drawings (Horizon, 1948).
- An English Farmhouse and Its Neighbourhood (Max Parrish, 1948).
- Places of the Mind (Routledge and Kegan Paul, 1949).
- Poems of John Clare's Madness (Routledge and Kegan Paul, 1949), editor.
- Poetry of the Present: an Anthology of the 'Thirties and After (Phoenix House, 1949), editor.
- The Crest on the Silver: an Autobiography (Cresset Press, 1950).
- The Victorians: an Anthology (Routledge & Kegan Paul, 1950).
- Flowers of the Meadow (Penguin Books, 1950).
- Festival of Britain "About Britain" Guides (Collins, 1951), general editor.
- Thornton's Temple of Flora (Collins, 1951).
- Essays From the Air: 29 Broadcast Talks (1951).
- A Master of Our Time: a Study of Wyndham Lewis (Methuen, 1951).
- Gardenage, or the Plants of Ninhursaga (Routledge & Kegan Paul, 1952).
- Legenda Suecana. Twenty-odd Poems (printed for the author, 1953)
- Freedom of the Parish (Phoenix House, 1954). About Pelynt, Cornwall.
- The Englishman's Flora (Phoenix House, 1955).
- The Shell Guide to Flowers of the Countryside (Phoenix House, 1955).
- Painted Caves (Phoenix House, 1957).
- The Shell Guide to Trees and Shrubs (Phoenix House, 1958).
- English Villages in Colour (Batsford, 1958).
- The Three Kings: a Christmas Book of Carols, Poems and Pieces (Gordon Fraser, 1958), editor.
- Looking and Finding (Phoenix House, 1958; revised edition John Baker, 1970).
- The Shell Guide to Wild Life (Phoenix House, 1959).
- A Herbal of All Sorts (Macmillan, 1959).
- The Cherry Tree (Phoenix House, 1959), poems.
- English Excursions (Country Life, 1960).
- Samuel Palmer's Valley of Vision (Phoenix House, 1960).
- The Shell Country Book (Phoenix House, 1962).
- Poets in Their Pride (Dent, 1962).
- Gerard Manley Hopkins (Longmans, Green & Co., 1962).
- Collected Poems 1924–1962 (Phoenix House, 1963).
- O Rare Mankind! (Phoenix House, 1963).
- The Shell Nature Book (Phoenix House, 1964).
- Shapes and Stories, with Jane Grigson (Readers Union, 1965).
- The Shell Country Alphabet (Michael Joseph, 1966; Particular Books, 2009, with introduction by Sophie Grigson).
- William Allingham's Diary (Centaur Press, 1967).
- A Skull in Salop, and Other Poems (Macmillan, 1967).
- An Ingestion of Ice Cream and Other Poems (Macmillan, 1969).
- Shapes and People – A Book about Pictures (J. Baker, 1969).
- Poems and Poets (Macmillan, 1969).
- Notes from an Odd Country (Macmillan, 1970).
- The Concise Encyclopedia of Modern World Literature (Hawthorn Books, 1970), editor.
- The Faber Book of Popular Verse (Faber & Faber, 1971), editor.
- Discoveries of Bones and Stones (Macmillan Poets; Macmillan, 1971).
- Sad Grave of an Imperial Mongoose (Macmillan, 1973), poems.
- The Faber Book of Love Poems (Faber & Faber, 1973), editor.
- The Faber Book of Popular Verse (Faber & Faber, 1973), editor.
- The First Folio (Poem of the Month Club, 1973).
- The Contrary View: Glimpses of Fudge and Gold (Macmillan, 1974).
- A Dictionary of English Plant Names (and some products of plants) (Allen Lane, 1974).
- Angles and Circles and Other Poems (Gollancz, 1974).
- Britain Observed: the Landscape Through Artists' Eyes (1975).
- The Penguin Book of Ballads (Penguin, 1975), editor.
- The Goddess of Love: The Birth, Triumph, Death and Return of Aphrodite (Quartet, 1978).
- The Faber Book of Epigrams and Epitaphs (Faber & Faber, 1978), editor.
- The Faber Book of Nonsense Verse: With a Sprinkling of Nonsense Prose (Faber & Faber, 1979), editor.
- The Oxford Book of Satirical Verse (Oxford University Press, 1980), editor.
- The Penguin Book of Unrespectable Verse (Penguin, 1980), editor.
- The Faber Book of Poems and Places (Faber & Faber, 1980), editor.
- History of Him (Secker & Warburg, 1980), poems.
- Blessings, Kicks and Curses: a critical collection (Allison & Busby, 1982).
- Collected Poems 1963–1980 (Allison & Busby, 1982).
- The Private Art: a Poetry Notebook (Allison & Busby, 1982).
- The Cornish Dancer and Other Poems (Secker & Warburg, 1982).
- Geoffrey Grigson's Countryside (Ebury Press, 1982).
- Recollections, Mainly of Writers and Artists (Hogarth Press, 1984).
- The English Year from Diaries and Letters (Oxford Paperbacks, 1984).
- The Faber Book of Reflective Verse (Faber & Faber, 1984), editor.
- Country Writings (Century, 1984).
- Montaigne's Tower and Other Poems (Secker & Warburg, 1984).
- Persephone's Flowers and Other Poems (David & Charles, 1986).
