= William Gregson (cricketer) =

Scottish cricketer

William Russell Gregson (5 August 1877 – 18 June 1963) was a Scottish cricketer active from 1906 to 1907 who played for Lancashire. He was born in Glasgow and died in Lancaster. He appeared in five first-class matches as a righthanded batsman who bowled right arm fast. He scored 62 runs with a highest score of 26 and took 24 wickets with a best analysis of five for 8.
