= Matthew Gregson =

English antiquarian (1749–1824)

- Born: 3 August 1749; Liverpool, England
- Died: 25 September 1824 (aged 75); England
- Other name: 1
- Occupation: Antiquarian
- Parent: Thomas Gregson

Matthew Gregson (3 August 1749 – 25 September 1824) was an English antiquarian.

== Life ==
Gregson, son of Thomas Gregson, shipbuilder, of Liverpool, previously of Whalley, Lancashire, was born at Liverpool in 1749. He was many years in business as an upholsterer, and when he retired in 1814 had amassed considerable property. Although of deficient education he took a deep interest in literature and science, and especially devoted attention to the collection of documentary and pictorial illustrations of the history of Lancashire. These he used in compiling his Portfolio of Fragments relative to the History and Antiquities of the County Palatine and Duchy of Lancaster, which he brought out in 1817 in three folio parts. The second and enlarged edition is dated 1824, and the third, edited and indexed by John Harland (1806–1868), a fellow antiquary specializing in Lancashire, came out in 1867. This work led to his election as a fellow of the Society of Antiquaries, and to his honorary membership in the Society of Antiquaries of Newcastle upon Tyne. He was offered knighthood by the Prince Regent on presenting a copy of the book, but declined the dignity. He often wrote on antiquarian subjects in the Gentleman's Magazine.

He played an energetic part in developing the public institutions of his native town, especially the Blue Coat School, the Liverpool Library, the Royal Institution, Botanic Gardens, and Liverpool Academy of Arts. He introduced the art of lithography into Liverpool, and used it in his Fragments.

He was elected in 1801 a member of the Royal Society of Arts, and in 1803 received the gold medal of that society "for his very great attention to render useful the articles remaining after public fires". He had shown that paint, varnish, and printers' ink could be produced from burnt grain and sugar.

Gregson charitable and hospitable, and his house acquired the title of "Gregson's Hotel". He died aged 75, after a fall from a ladder in his library. A monument to his memory was afterwards placed in St. John's churchyard, Liverpool.

== Family ==
Gregson was twice married, first to Jane Foster; and secondly, to Anne Rimmer of Warrington, and he left several children.
