= Sean McDonald =

American book editor

Sean McDonald is an American book editor, serving as executive editor and vice president of Farrar, Straus and Giroux and publisher of its experimental imprint, MCD/FSG, prior to the imprint's closure in April 2026.

== Career ==
Authors he has edited include Kobe Bryant, Sloane Crosley, Junot Díaz, John Darnielle, Cory Doctorow, Nuruddin Farah, James Frey, Gorillaz, Nicola Griffith, Aleksandar Hemon, John Hodgman, Marlon James, Adam Johnson, Steven Johnson, Walter Mosley, Ray Nayler, Tyler Perry, David Rees, the RZA, George Saunders, Sjón, Robin Sloan, Rivers Solomon, Sly Stone, John Jeremiah Sullivan, Greg Tate, Héctor Tobar, Questlove, Ellen Ullman, Jeff VanderMeer, and Kawai Strong Washburn.

As publisher of MCD, he oversaw the publications of Tessa Hulls's Pulitzer Prize–winner Feeding Ghosts, Jonathan Escoffery's Booker Prize-finalist If I Survive You, and Anna Wiener's Uncanny Valley.

In addition to MCD, McDonald is credited with co-founding the AUWA imprint with Questlove as well as FSG Originals, the esteemed publishing house's paperback original line.

Prior to FSG, he worked as an Executive Editor and Vice President of Riverhead Books and before that at Nan A. Talese/Doubleday, most notably as editor of James Frey's controversial bestselling memoir A Million Little Pieces.

== Awards ==
In 2003, he was named "It" editor of the year by Entertainment Weekly and a "Power Punk" (influential New Yorkers under 35) by the New York Observer. In 2005 he was named a "Young Turk" of publishing by Publishers Weekly.
