= Farrar, Straus and Giroux =

American book publisher

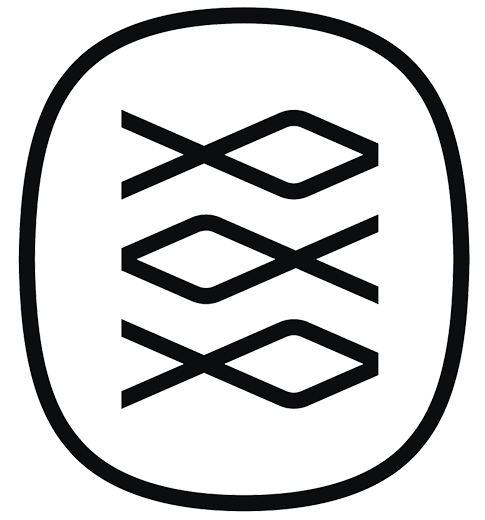
- Parent company: Macmillan Publishers
- Founded: 1946; 80 years ago
- Founder: John C. Farrar; Roger W. Straus Jr.; Robert Giroux (joined 1955)
- Country of origin: United States
- Headquarters location: Equitable Building; New York City, New York
- Distribution: Macmillan (US); Melia Publishing Services (UK)
- Key people: Mitzi Angel (president); Jonathan Galassi (chairman and executive editor)
- Imprints: MCD, FSG Originals, AUWA, Quanta Books, North Point Press, Hill and Wang
- Official website: us.macmillan.com/fsg/

Farrar, Straus and Giroux (FSG) is an American book publishing company, founded in 1946 by Roger Williams Straus Jr. and John C. Farrar. FSG is known for publishing literary books, and its authors have won numerous awards, including Pulitzer Prizes, National Book Awards, and Nobel Prizes. Since 1993, the publisher has been a division of Macmillan, whose parent company is the German publishing conglomerate Holtzbrinck Publishing Group.

== Founding ==
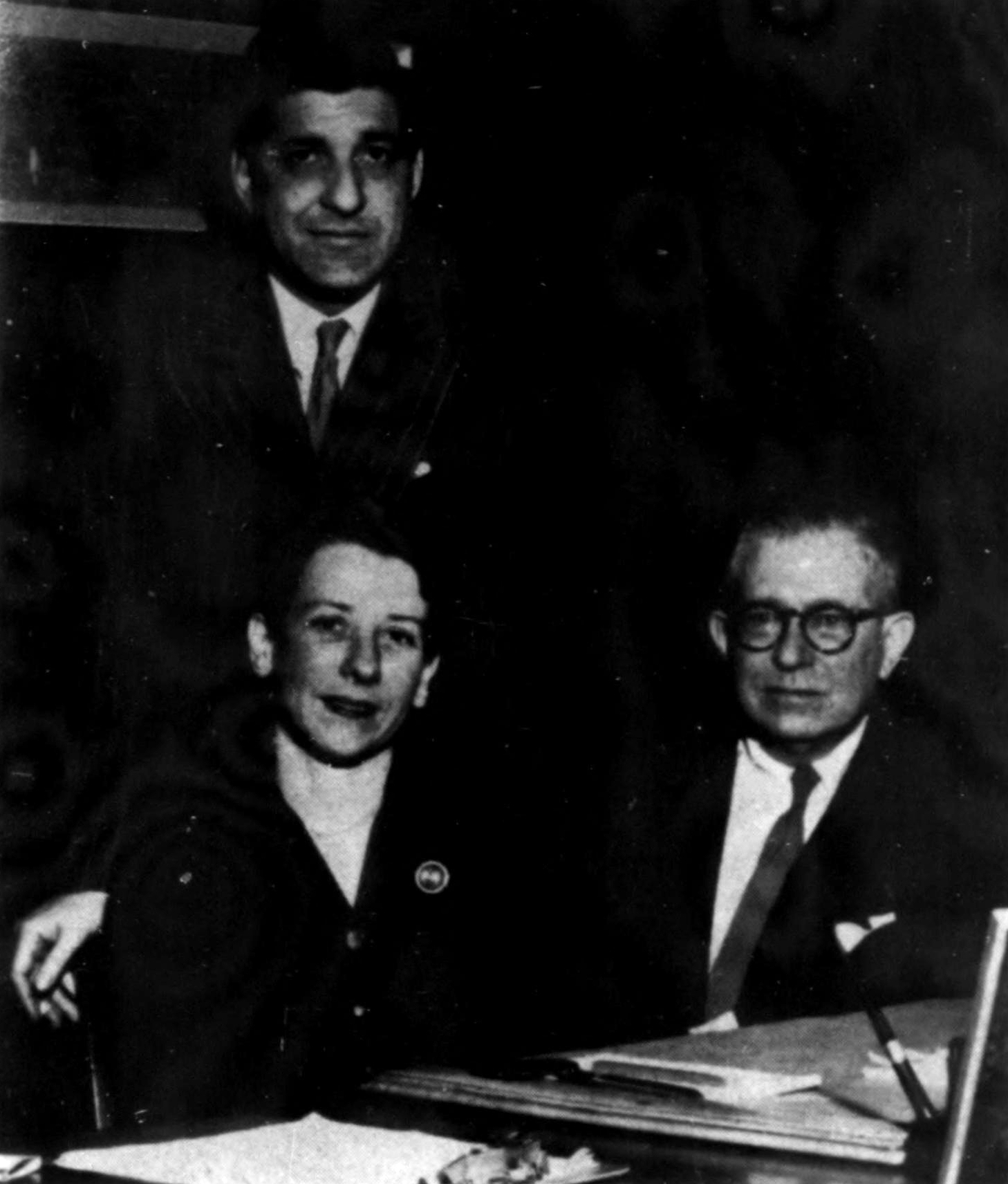
Roger Williams Straus Jr. (standing) with John C. Farrar (seated, right) and Sheila Cudahy, another business partner, c. December 1956

Farrar, Straus, and Company was founded in 1945 by Roger W. Straus Jr. and John C. Farrar. The first book was Yank: The G.I. Story of the War, a compilation of articles that appeared in Yank, the Army Weekly, then There Were Two Pirates, a novel by James Branch Cabell.

The first years of existence were rough until they published the diet book Look Younger, Live Longer by Gayelord Hauser in 1950. The book went on to sell 500,000 copies and Straus said that the book carried them along for a while. In the early years, Straus and his wife Dorothea, went prospecting for books in Italy. It was there that they found the memoir Christ Stopped at Eboli by Carlo Levi and other rising Italian authors: Alberto Moravia, Giovannino Guareschi and Cesare Pavese. Farrar, Straus also poached or lured away authors from other publishers—one was Edmund Wilson, who was unhappy with Random House at the time but remained with Farrar, Straus for the remainder of his career.

In 1950, the name changed to Farrar, Straus & Young (for Stanley Young, a playwright, author (at Farrar & Rinehart), a literary critic for The New York Times, and an original stockholder and board member).

== Merger ==
In 1953, Pellegrini & Cudahy merged with Farrar, Straus & Young.

Robert Giroux joined the company in 1955, and after he later became a partner, the name was changed to Farrar, Straus and Giroux. Giroux had been working for Harcourt and had been angered when Harcourt refused to allow him to publish Salinger's Catcher in the Rye. Giroux brought many literary authors with him including Thomas Merton, John Berryman, Robert Lowell, Flannery O'Connor, Jack Kerouac, Peter Taylor, Randall Jarrell, T.S. Eliot, and Bernard Malamud. Alan Williams described Giroux's "Pied Piper sweep" as "almost certainly the greatest number of authors to follow, on their own initiative, a single editor from house to house in the history of modern publishing." In 1964, Straus named Giroux chairman of the board and officially added Giroux's name to the publishing company.

== Sale ==
Straus continued to run the company for twenty years after his partner Farrar died, until 1993 when he sold a majority interest of the company to the privately owned German publishing conglomerate Georg von Holtzbrinck Publishing Group. Straus offered FSG to the Holtzbrinck family because of their reputation for publishing serious works of literature.

== Twenty-first century ==
Jonathan Galassi served as both president and publisher until 2018. From 2004 to 2021, Andrew Mandel served as deputy publisher. In 2008, Mitzi Angel came from Fourth Estate in the UK to be publisher of the Faber and Faber Inc. imprint. In 2018, Angel succeeded Galassi as publisher, and was named president in 2021. Jenna Johnson was named vice president and editor in chief in December 2021, taking the baton from Eric Chinski, who was named senior executive editor after 15 years as editor in chief. Other notable editors include Alex Star.

In February 2015, FSG and Faber and Faber announced the end of their partnership. All books scheduled for release and previously released under the imprint were moved to the FSG colophon by August 2016.

== Name history ==
- Farrar, Straus, and Company (1945–1951)
- Farrar, Straus and Young (1950–1956)
- Farrar, Straus and Cudahy (1953–1963) – acquired L.C. Page & Co. in 1957
- Farrar, Straus, and Company (1963–1964) after Cudahy left the firm.
- Farrar, Straus and Giroux (1964–present)

== Current imprints ==
- FSG Originals is FSG's line of paperback and digital originals, established in 2011 by Sean McDonald and Emily Bell. Notable publications include Threats by Amelia Gray, People Who Eat Darkness by Richard Lloyd Parry, Pulphead by John Jeremiah Sullivan, and Jeff VanderMeer's Area X trilogy (Annihilation, Authority, and Acceptance).
- AUWA Books (originally established as a division of MCD/FSG) is an imprint directed by Questlove, the celebrated musician, producer, director, and author devoted to finding inspiring new stories and connecting readers to lost voices while building a community of curious minds. Notable books include Thank You (Falettinme Be Mice Elf Agin) (book) by Sly Stone, Hip Hop is History by Questlove, Loud by Drew Afualo, and reissues of Flyboy in the Buttermilk by Greg Tate and Yes I Can by Sammy Davis, Jr.
- Quanta Books is a partnership between FSG and the Simons Foundation that publishes work that strives to illuminate humanity’s quest to understand the universe. From the founding editor of Pulitzer Prize-winning Quanta Magazine.
- Hill and Wang publishes books of academic interest and specializes in history. Its authors include Roland Barthes, William Cronon, Langston Hughes, and Elie Wiesel.
- North Point Press published literary nonfiction with an emphasis on natural history, travel, ecology, music, food, and cultural criticism. Its authors include Peter Matthiessen, Beryl Markham, Marion Nestle, Guy Davenport, A. J. Liebling, Margaret Visser, Wendell Berry, and M. F. K. Fisher.

== Former imprints ==
- MCD/FSG, a lab to experiment with new styles and genres. The first book published by MCD was Jeff VanderMeer's Borne in 2017. Other notable publications included #1 New York Times Best Seller The Mamba Mentality by Kobe Bryant, Dilla Time by Dan Charnas, The World and All that it Holds by Aleksandar Hemon, Pulitzer Prize–winner Feeding Ghosts by Tessa Hulls, The Wayfinder by Adam Johnson, Robin Sloan's Mr. Penumbra's 24-Hour Bookstore, Model Home by Rivers Solomon, PEN/Hemingway Award–winner Sharks in the Time of Saviors by Kawai Strong Washburn's , and Uncanny Valley by Anna Wiener. The imprint was headed by Sean McDonald, who was joined by Daphne Durham, formerly editor-in-chief and publisher of Amazon Publishing, as executive director to launch the imprint. Durham left MCD in 2023 to join Putnam. Also in 2023, AUWA Books was launched in collaboration with Questlove as a division of MCD. MCD was closed in 2026.
- Sarah Crichton Books published books with a slightly commercial bent. The imprint launched with Cathleen Falsani's The God Factor in 2006. Ishmael Beah's A Long Way Gone was a bestseller and a Starbucks-featured book in 2007.
- Faber and Faber Inc. published a backlist of drama and books on the arts, entertainment, music, pop culture, cultural criticism, and the media. Its authors included David Auburn, Margaret Edson, Doug Wright, Richard Greenberg, Tom Stoppard, David Hare, Neil LaBute, Peter Conrad, Martin Eisenstadt and Courtney Love.
- Scientific American / FSG, founded by Thomas Lebien and then led by Amanda Moon, published non-fiction popular science books for the general reader. Its authors included Jesse Bering, Daniel Chamovitz, Kevin Dutton, and Caleb Scharf.
- Noonday Press
- Melanie Kroupa Books (children's book imprint, 2000–2008)
- FSG Originals x Logic, a short-lived imprint for technology books that published Blockchain Chicken Farm.

== Books for Young Readers ==
FSG Books for Young Readers publishes National Book Award winners Madeleine L'Engle (1980), William Steig (1983), Louis Sachar (1998), and Polly Horvath (2003). Books for Young Readers also publishes Natalie Babbitt, Roald Dahl, Jack Gantos, George Selden, Uri Shulevitz, Ozge Samanci, and Peter Sis. FSG Books for Young Readers is operated by Macmillan Children's Publishing Group.

== Awards ==
Winners of the Nobel Prize in Literature

- Knut Hamsun (1920)
- Hermann Hesse (1946)
- T. S. Eliot (1948)
- Pär Lagerkvist (1951)
- François Mauriac (1952)
- Juan Ramón Jiménez (1956)
- Salvatore Quasimodo (1959)
- Nelly Sachs (1966)
- Yasunari Kawabata (1968)
- Aleksandr Solzhenitsyn (1970)
- Pablo Neruda (1971)
- Eugenio Montale (1975)
- Isaac Bashevis Singer (1978)
- Czesław Miłosz (1980)
- Elias Canetti (1981)
- William Golding (1983)
- Wole Soyinka (1986)
- Joseph Brodsky (1987)
- Camilo José Cela (1989)
- Nadine Gordimer (1991)
- Derek Walcott (1992)
- Seamus Heaney (1995)
- Mario Vargas Llosa (2010)
- Peter Handke (2019)
- Louise Glück (2020)

Winners of the Nobel Peace Prize

- Norman Angell (1933)
- Elie Wiesel (1986)
- Nelson Mandela (1993)

Winners of the Pulitzer Prize

- John Berryman (1965)
- Bernard Malamud (1967)
- Jean Stafford (1970)
- Robert Lowell (1974)
- Paul Horgan (1976)
- Lanford Wilson (1980)
- James Schuyler (1981)
- Charles Fuller (1982)
- Marsha Norman (1983)
- Thomas L. Friedman (1983, 1988, 2002)
- Oscar Hijuelos (1990)
- Charles Wright (1998)
- Michael Cunningham (1999)
- John McPhee (1999)
- Margaret Edson (1999)
- C. K. Williams (2000)
- David Auburn (2001)
- Louis Menand (2002)
- Jeffrey Eugenides (2003)
- Paul Muldoon (2003)
- Doug Wright (2004)
- Marilynne Robinson (2005)
- Elizabeth A. Fenn (2015)
- Frank Bidart (2017)
- James Forman Jr. (2018)
- Anne Boyer (2020)
- Jonathan Eig (2024)
- Tessa Hulls (2025)
- Yiyun Li (2026)
- Amanda Vaill (2026)

Winners of the National Book Award

- Bernard Malamud (1959, 1967)
- Robert Lowell (1960)
- John Berryman (1969)
- Elizabeth Bishop (1970)
- Isaac Bashevis Singer (1970, 1974)
- Donald Barthelme (1972)
- Flannery O'Connor (1972)
- Richard B. Sewall (1975)
- Michael J. Arlen (1976)
- Tom Wolfe (1980)
- Paula Fox (1983)
- Larry Heinemann (1987)
- Thomas L. Friedman (1989)
- Alice McDermott (1998)
- Edward Ball (1998)
- Susan Sontag (2000)
- Jonathan Franzen (2001)
- Shirley Hazzard (2003)
- C. K. Williams (2003)
- Richard Powers (2006)
- Denis Johnson (2007)
- George Packer (2013)
- Louise Glück (2014)
- Evan Osnos (2014)
- Justin Torres (2023)

== Notable authors ==
- Ishmael Beah
- Paul Beatty
- John Berryman
- Roberto Bolaño
- Joseph Brodsky
- Kobe Bryant
- Dan Charnas
- John Darnielle
- Joan Didion
- Cory Doctorow
- David Duchovny
- T. S. Eliot
- Jeffrey Eugenides
- Jonathan Franzen
- Louise Glück
- Garth Greenwell
- Abraham Joshua Heschel
- Tessa Hulls
- Randall Jarrell
- Adam Johnson (writer)
- Denis Johnson
- Jamaica Kincaid
- Yusef Komunyakaa
- Ken Layne
- Madeleine L'Engle
- Ben Lerner
- Carlo Levi
- Robert Lowell
- Bernard Malamud
- John McPhee
- Thomas Merton
- Flannery O'Connor
- Walker Percy
- Sally Rooney
- Louis Sachar
- Isaac Bashevis Singer
- Robin Sloan
- Rivers Solomon
- Aleksandr Solzhenitsyn
- Susan Sontag
- Theodore Sturgeon
- Peter Taylor
- Ahmir "Questlove" Thompson
- Scott Turow
- Jeff VanderMeer
- Carvell Wallace
- Kawai Strong Washburn
- Edmund Wilson
- Tom Wolfe

== Staff ==
Jack Kerouac's then-girlfriend Joyce Johnson started work in 1957, when Sheila Cudahy was a partner at the firm.

== Publications ==
- Meet the Austins (1997), written by Madeleine L'Engle, illustrated by Dennis Nolan
