= William Woys Weaver =

Culinary historian

William Woys Weaver (born March 13, 1947) is an American culinary historian, author, and researcher of heirloom plants. His work examines Pennsylvania Dutch cuisine, American regional foodways, medieval Polish cuisine, and food in Lusignan-era Cyprus. He is known for his books on culinary history and historic food plants and for his stewardship of the Roughwood Seed Collection.

== Biography ==
=== Early life and career ===
William Woys Weaver was born in West Chester, Pennsylvania, on March 13, 1947, to H. William and Alameda (née Woys) Weaver. Through his paternal grandmother, Grace Weaver (née Hickman), he is descended from 13 generations of Quakers. His paternal grandfather, Ralph Weaver, was a former Mennonite who spoke the Pennsylvania Dutch language, teaching Weaver as he grew up. Ralph was an avid seed collector, and in 1932 he founded the Roughwood Seed Collection, with seeds collected from family members in Lancaster County. Other varieties came from Ralph's friend Horace Pippin, the African-American painter, who supplied peppers such as the Fish pepper. Ralph Weaver died in 1956.

As a teenager, Weaver was interested in writing and produced several short stories. Some of these were read by Alexandra Tolstaya, the Russian writer and daughter of Leo Tolstoy, who encouraged Weaver to continue writing. Weaver studied architecture at the University of Virginia and received his Bachelor of Arts in 1969, which he followed with postgraduate studies in architectural history at the school. In August 1970, Weaver married another student in his architectural history cohort but they divorced after two years of marriage. In 1971, he traveled to Vicenza, Italy, where he completed studies at the International Center for Palladian Studies.

In the course of his studies, Weaver moved to New York where he worked on the completion of his master's thesis and in 1972 took on a job as editor at Dover Press in Manhattan. Initially dealing only with architecture books, Weaver gradually took on editing duties for herbals and gardening books. On weekends, he traveled back to Pennsylvania, working on re-establishing his grandfather's garden. In a later interview, Weaver described feeling a distaste for working in an office, and said that vegetables sold in the city were tasteless compared to those he had eaten fresh from gardens growing up.

=== Return to West Chester ===
Weaver returned to West Chester in 1973, moving into the family home he had inherited. In West Chester, Weaver worked at Ametek, a manufacturer of industrial components, as the director of product information. Simultaneously, he worked part-time writing articles, later moving to books. (Note: An entry in Contemporary Authors indicates that Weaver continued work at Dover into 1974.) It was around this time that Weaver found his grandfather's cache of rare heirloom seeds, kept frozen in baby food jars after Ralph Weaver's death. Weaver decided to maintain the seed collection, procuring varieties from relatives. Asked about this time in an interview, Weaver reflected, "I brought the collection back from the dead—though, in the beginning, I killed a lot of rare things. I was a beginner."

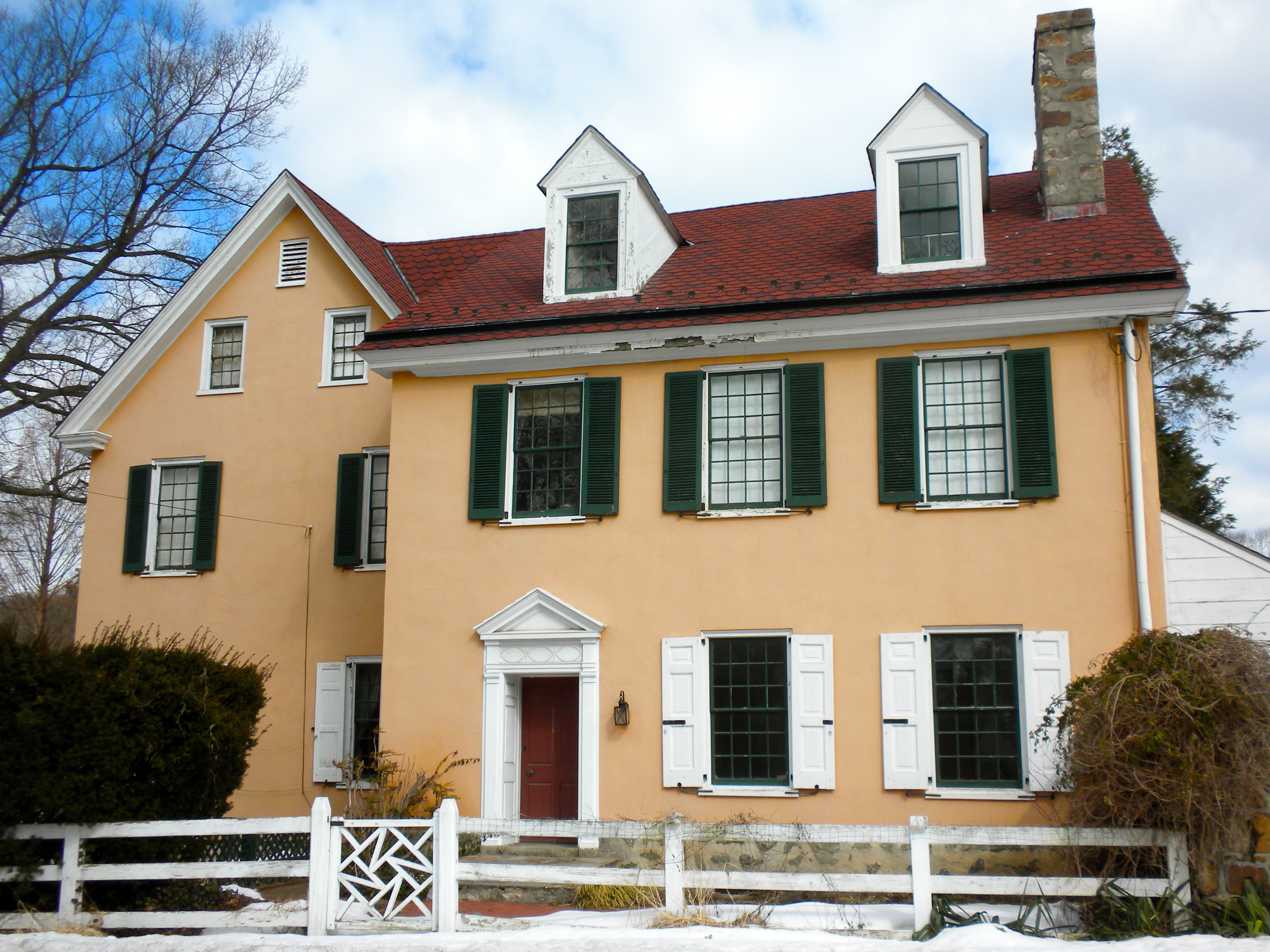
Roughwood

In 1977, Weaver began work as a full-time food historian. Two years later, he sold the family home and purchased Roughwood, a house in Devon, Pennsylvania. Roughwood had been constructed around 1805, and had served as the Lamb Tavern in the early 19th century.

Weaver's cousin Mary Larkin Thomas died at the age of 92 in 1982. Thomas was a seed-collecting enthusiast too, collecting from sources including sailors and Native American friends, and she bequeathed her collection to Weaver. That year, Weaver published A Quaker Woman's Cookbook: The Domestic Cooking of Elizabeth Ellicott Lea, and the following year released Sauerkraut Yankees: Pennsylvania-German Foods and Foodways, both through the University of Pennsylvania Press. As clerk of the Marlborough Quaker Meeting, he also wrote a pamphlet, "The Marlborough Footwashing", on a 1781 dispute and reconciliation between two neighbors, members of the meeting.

In 1986, Weaver served as guest curator with Mary Anne Hines and Gordon Marshall of the Library Company of Philadelphia to produce the exhibition The Larder Invaded: Reflections on Three Centuries of Philadelphia Food and Drink, displayed at the Library Company of Philadelphia and Historical Society of Pennsylvania. Two years later, Weaver guest curated another food history exhibition, America Eats: Folk Art and Food at the Museum of American Folk Art in Manhattan. Displayed were ephemera and kitchenware from early American kitchens, including muffin tins and baskets, as well as objects such as a late-19th century popcorn drier from Iowa and a wafer iron from 1770, gifted by a young man to his fiancée. Particular attention was given to the Anglo-German culinary traditions of New England. The exhibit opened in December 1989, and ran into February 1990.

Weaver was profiled in The Christian Science Monitor in 1988. At that time, Weaver had amassed a large library of ephemera—engravings, antique cookware—through inheritance and purchases that he drew upon to illustrate his writings. He lived in Devon in Chester County, Pennsylvania, working on the restoration of Roughwood. He maintained a large kitchen garden at the property, growing eucalyptus, fruit trees, herbs, and vegetables. The garden was designed in an antebellum style influenced by the jardin potager, French-style vegetable gardens.

In 1997, Weaver's book Heirloom Vegetable Gardening: A Master Gardener's Guide to Planting, Seed Saving and Cultural History was published by Henry Holt & Company. The book was met with acclaim, winning the Julia Child Award for Food Reference and the Jane Grigson Award for Distinguished Scholarship.

=== 2000 onwards ===
Heirlooms reintroduced by Weaver

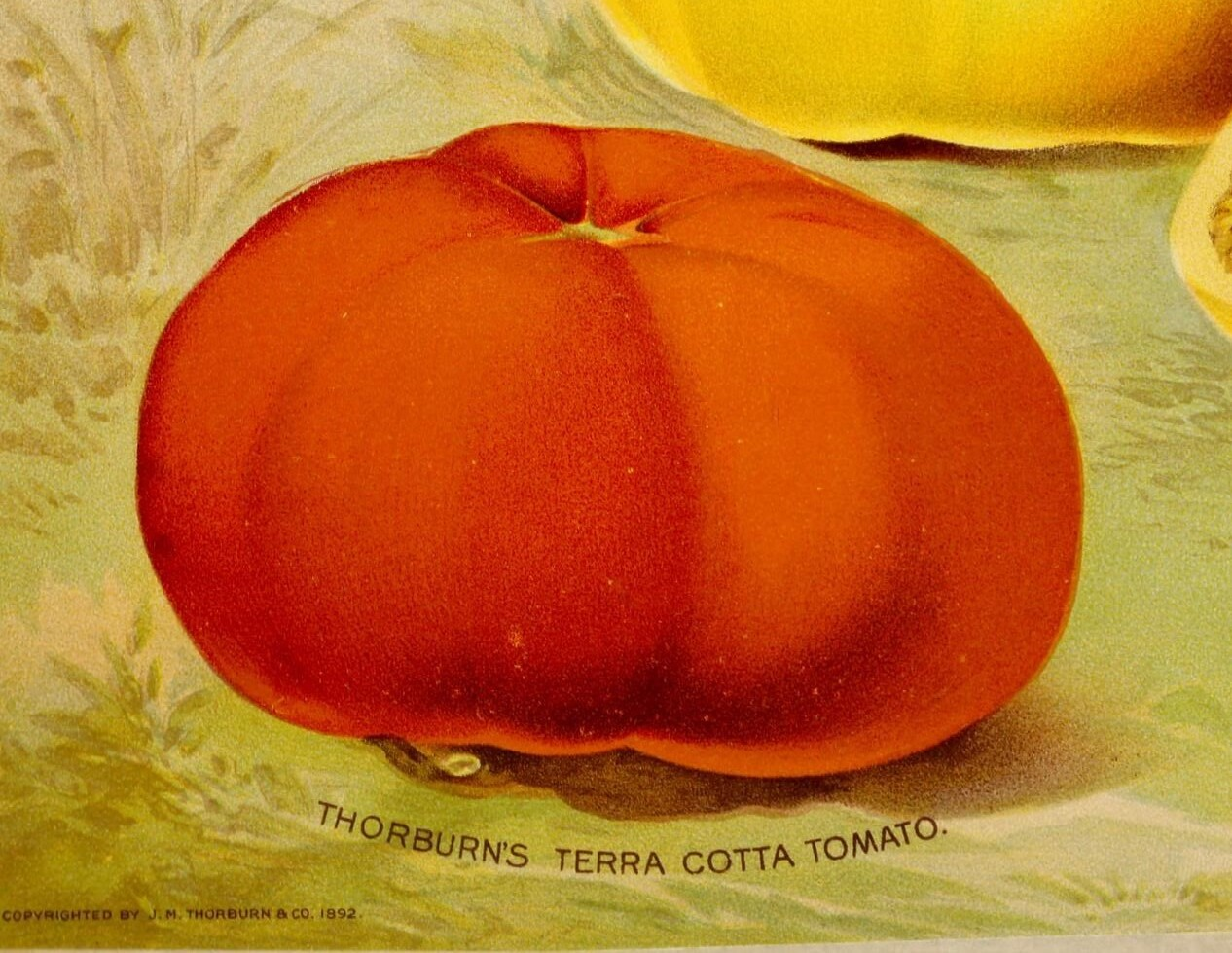
Thorburn's Terra Cotta Tomato

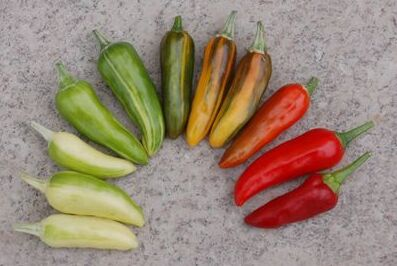
Fish pepper

In 2000 he published 100 Vegetables and Where They Came From through Algonquin Books. A profile in the New York Times described Weaver at this time as "the Julia Child of long-lost vegetables", crediting him with having "transformed the field of heirloom vegetables". By this point, his seed collection had grown to 3000 varieties. He planted them in cycles in his garden and greenhouse. Some of those seeds were sent to the Seed Savers Exchange where they could be purchased by the public, as well as by botanical gardens, museums, and researchers.

Weaver used the plants he grew from his heirloom seed collection in a range of culinary applications, including a champagne made from champagne rhubarb and a salsa from Naranjilla, Aji Limón pepper, and mango. He occasionally made a strong parsley tea which he drank for the sake of his kidneys, describing them as in poor condition "after I was bitten by a brown recluse spider and nearly died". He and his cousin Dr. Don Yoder, the noted scholar on religious history, assembled the Roughwood Collection of early Pennsylvania German imprints.

In 2001, Weaver published Sauer's Herbal Cures, an annotated translation of a herbal originally written in the late 18th century by Johann Christoph Sauer, an apothecary who lived in the Philadelphia area. In an interview with the New York Times, he described a family connection to healers in the Philadelphia area: a Quaker cousin had tended her family during the Spanish Flu wearing a sachet of garlic and herbs around her neck, and none of her relatives had fallen ill.

Weaver received his PhD in food ethnography from University College in Dublin, Ireland.

As of 2010, Weaver had the role of adjunct professor at Drexel University. His seed collection was at 4000 varieties, and he was hosting gardening workshops at his home. He continued writing, and in September released Culinary Ephemera: An Illustrated History, through the University of California Press. By that time, Roughwood had grown to become the largest private collection of Eastern Woodlands Native American food plants. Weaver described his goal as preserving the genetics of seeds that may otherwise be lost, as most food is grown through cross-breeding. As of 2025, Weaver no longer resides at Roughwood. His collection of culinary ephemera and cookbooks is at the Library Company of Philadelphia, while his collection of Pennsylvania German artifacts are at the Pennsylvania German Cultural Heritage Center, Kutztown University. Today, the Roughwood Seed Collection is also housed at Kutztown University.

== Works ==
Books by William Woys Weaver

	Publisher	Year	Pages	OCLC/ISBN	Notes
A Quaker Woman's Cookbook: The Domestic Cooking of Elizabeth Ellicott Lea	University of Pennsylvania Press	1982	394	ISBN 0-8122-7848-8	
Sauerkraut Yankees: Pennsylvania-German Foods and Foodways	Oxford University Press	1983	238	ISBN 0-8122-7868-2	
35 Receipts from "The Larder Invaded"	Library Company of Philadelphia	1986			
America Eats: Forms of Edible Folk Art	Perennial Library	1989		ISBN 0060551771	
The Christmas Cook: Three Centuries of American Yuletide Sweets	HarperPerennial	1990	267	ISBN 0-06-055212-3	
Pennsylvania Dutch Country Cooking	Abbeville Press	1993		ISBN 1-55859-568-6	
Heirloom Vegetable Gardening: A Master Gardener's Guide to Planting, Seed Saving and Cultural History	Henry Holt and Company	1997		ISBN 0805060898	
Food and Drink in Medieval Poland: Rediscovering a Cuisine of the Past by Maria Dembińska	University of Pennsylvania Press	1999		ISBN 0-8122-3224-0	Revised and adapted
100 Vegetables and Where They Came From	Algonquin Books	2000		ISBN 1565122380	
Sauer's Herbal Cures: America's First Book of Botanic Healing	Routledge	2001		ISBN 0415923603	
The Encyclopedia of Food and Culture	Scribner	2003		ISBN 0684805685	Associate editor and art editor; contributor of 29 entries
Country Scrapple: An American Tradition	Stackpole Books	2003		ISBN 081170064X	
The Royal Garden of Pefkou: A Study of Fruit Consumption in Medieval Nicosia	Moufflon Publications	2006		ISBN 9789963642250	Monograph
Culinary Ephemera: An Illustrated History	University of California Press	2010		ISBN 978-0-520-25977-5	
As American as Shoofly Pie: The Foodlore and Fakelore of Pennsylvania Dutch Cuisine	University of Pennsylvania Press	2013		ISBN 978-0-8122-4479-3	
Dutch Treats: Heirloom Recipes from Farmhouse Kitchens	St. Lynn's Press	2016		ISBN 978-1-943366-04-0	
The Roughwood Book Of Pickling: Homestyle Recipes For Chutneys, Pickles, Relishes, Salsas And Vinegar Infusions	Rizzoli	2019	208	ISBN 978-0-7893-3678-1	
Flavors from the Garden: Heirloom Vegetable Recipes from Roughwood	Rizzoli	2021	208	ISBN 978-0-8478-7079-0	
Pepperpot City: Philadelphia and the Foundation of American Cuisine, An Illustrated History	University of Pennsylvania Press	2026	280	ISBN 9781512830040	

=== 1980s ===
==== A Quaker Woman's Cookbook: The Domestic Cooking of Elizabeth Ellicott Lea (1982) ====
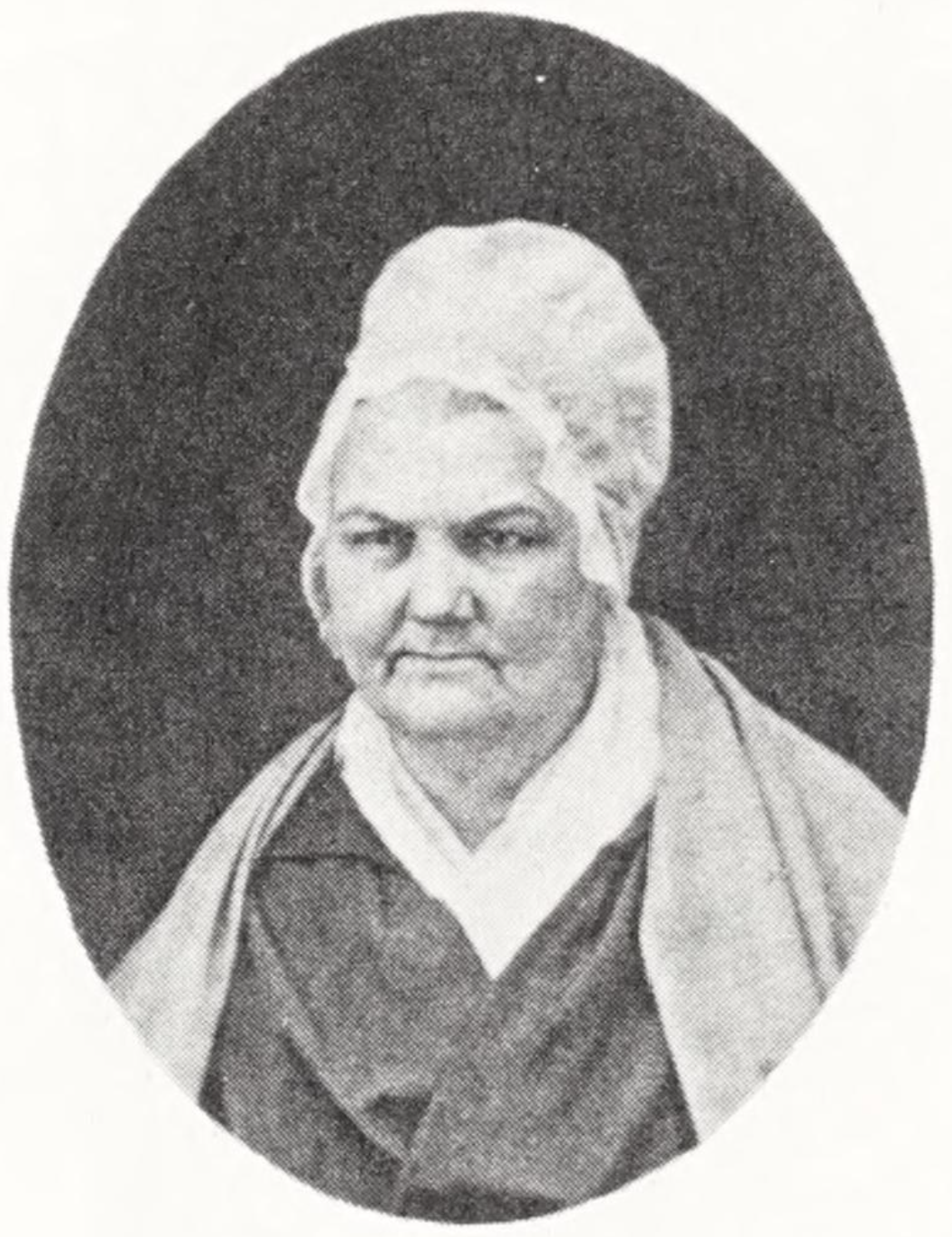
Elizabeth Ellicott Lea

Elizabeth Ellicott Lea was born in 1793 in Maryland, and spent much of her life in the state until her death in 1858. In 1845, she released Domestic Cookery, a recipe book focused on popular fare rather than the elaborate preparations that dominated the cookbooks of the time. A second edition, published in 1851, expanded the book to contain advice on the domestic duties of housewives, including preventing food waste and treating sickness. Weaver's A Quaker Woman's Cookbook deals with this second edition, providing annotations, bibliography, and an introduction with contextual information on Ellicott's biography, and the book's writing, editing and reception.

Weaver's analysis was commented on in reviews in Pennsylvania History and The Virginia Magazine of History and Biography, where his contributions were found to be worthwhile. A review in Publishers Weekly commented on the overall text, describing it as "valuable as a footnote to Middle Atlantic States folklore of the early 19th century". In Keystone Folklore, the reviewer gave strong praise to Weaver's work, finding the bibliography capably done and the glossary so "graceful, amusing and informative that it is a delight to read".

==== Sauerkraut Yankees: Pennsylvania-German Foods and Foodways (1983) ====
Weaver's next book was written around his translation of Die geschickte Hausfrau ('The Handy Housewife'), a Pennsylvania Dutch-language cookbook first published in 1848 by Gustav Peters, a printer in Harrisburg, Pennsylvania. Weaver cut some of the content unrelated to cookery and organized the remaining 139 recipes, accompanying each with an essay. In addition, an introduction, a bibliography, footnotes, 19th-century illustrations, and nineteen recipes from other period cookbooks and household manuals were included.

==== The Larder Invaded (1987) ====
The Larder Invaded, a lithograph by Philadelphia artist William Smith inspired the title of the exhibition.

Between 1986 and 1987, Weaver served as the guest curator for an exhibition at the Library Company of Philadelphia and Historical Society of Pennsylvania titled The Larder Invaded: Reflections on Three Centuries of Philadelphia Food and Drink. To accompany the exhibition, two texts were released: The Larder Invaded: Three Centuries of Philadelphia Food and Drink, which served as a catalogue of the exhibit and included a microfiche of the labels from the exhibit, and a second volume, 35 Receipts from the Larder Invaded, which contained recipes from the exhibition, tested by Weaver in his kitchen with notes on adaptations for the modern kitchen.

==== America Eats: Forms of Edible Folk Art (1989) ====
America Eats was an illustrated collection of essays published through Harper & Row to accompany the exhibition America Eats: Folk Art and Food that he curated at the Museum of American Folk Art. Within the book, Weaver argues that early American folk-cookery was based around a sense of "connectedness", linking cooking to people, nature, and place, something that has since been lost. America Eats contains 42 recipes that Weaver had adapted to modern kitchens, such as a Maryland beaten biscuit recipe that originally called for beating the batter with an axe for half an hour—Weaver instead suggested a rolling pin. Some of the recipes were sourced from Weaver's grandmother, Grace. In a 2004 interview, Weaver described writing the book very quickly after the scope of the exhibition was changed at the last minute: "I had to come up with a book very quickly... so in essentially five days I wrote America Eats without going to bed. There are people who can vouch for that [laughs]. I never want to do a book like that again. I collapsed as I typed the last word [laughs]."

A review in the New York Times gave praise to America Eats, particularly on Weaver's ability to explain the context of the pieces and stated that it works as a standalone from the exhibit. The book was also recommended by William Rice in the Chicago Tribune, who called it "a fascinating blend of culinary folk history, information about antique cooking utensils and recipes", and Leslie Land in the San Francisco Examiner, who commended the book as interesting, insightful and beautifully illustrated, if "far from complete" as an effort in tracking changes in American cooking through its kitchenware.

=== 1990s ===
==== The Christmas Cook: Three Centuries of American Yuletide Sweets (1990) ====
In 1990, Weaver published The Christmas Cook via HarperPerennial, giving a history of Christmas food with recipes updated for the modern kitchen, with particular attention given to sweets. The book contained recipes for eighty-eight Christmas foods, mostly from the 19th century, including humbug pie, peanut taffy, and plum pudding. Besides detailing the history of individual foods, Weaver also covered the history of kitchenware; the history of the cookie cutter for instance is tracked from the 16th century to World War I.

A contemporary review in Publishers Weekly praised Weaver for his research, while qualifying "a limp handshake may be in order for his use of it." Much of the book's content, the reviewer found, was confusingly organized, in many cases failing to address a coherent subtopic. They also found Weaver's adaptations of recipes to the modern kitchen impractical, deeming it unlikely many would bother to make or have the tools required for dishes like "clear toy candies" or "oranges filled with jelly". A reviewer in the Washington Post also praised the book for its research, while calling its content "fascinating" and its recipes like jumbles and puddings worth making, despite their old-fashioned character. Other praise for the book came from Gael Greene in New York and Jeffrey Steingarten in Vogue, for the book's illustrations. A later recommendation for the book came from Marialisa Calta of the New York Times in 1997. Calta praised The Christmas Cook as interesting and well-illustrated, yet lamented that the book, by then out of print, was difficult to find.

==== Pennsylvania Dutch Country Cooking (1993) ====
Weaver followed The Christmas Cook in 1993 with Pennsylvania Dutch Country Cooking, a history of Pennsylvania Dutch cuisine and the Pennsylvania Dutch more broadly. It set out to correct misconceptions about the cuisine, saying "Our cookery is grossly misrepresented": the Pennsylvania Dutch are not all Amish, Pennsylvania Dutch cuisine is not the same as the fare served to tourists, and "Dutch" in "Pennsylvania Dutch" does not refer to people from the Netherlands. The book was extensively illustrated with photographs taken by Jerry Orabona and various recipes were included, accompanied by commentary. While Weaver had adapted them to the modern kitchen, these were often time and labor intensive, in one case requiring the cook grow and harvest chickweed.

Pennsylvania Dutch Country Cooking received positive notice in several American newspapers and in Publishers Weekly. Reviews praised the quality of Weaver's scholarly rigor, with the reviewer in Publishers Weekly commending Weaver's explanations of Pennsylvania Dutch culture and cookery as clear and insightful. They also gave attention to the book's recipes, describing the adaptations as "outstanding", while warning readers that many would take a significant investment in time. At the 1993 Julia Child Award, Pennsylvania Dutch Country Cooking was awarded the Jane Grigson Award.

=== 2010s ===
==== Culinary Ephemera: An Illustrated History (2010) ====
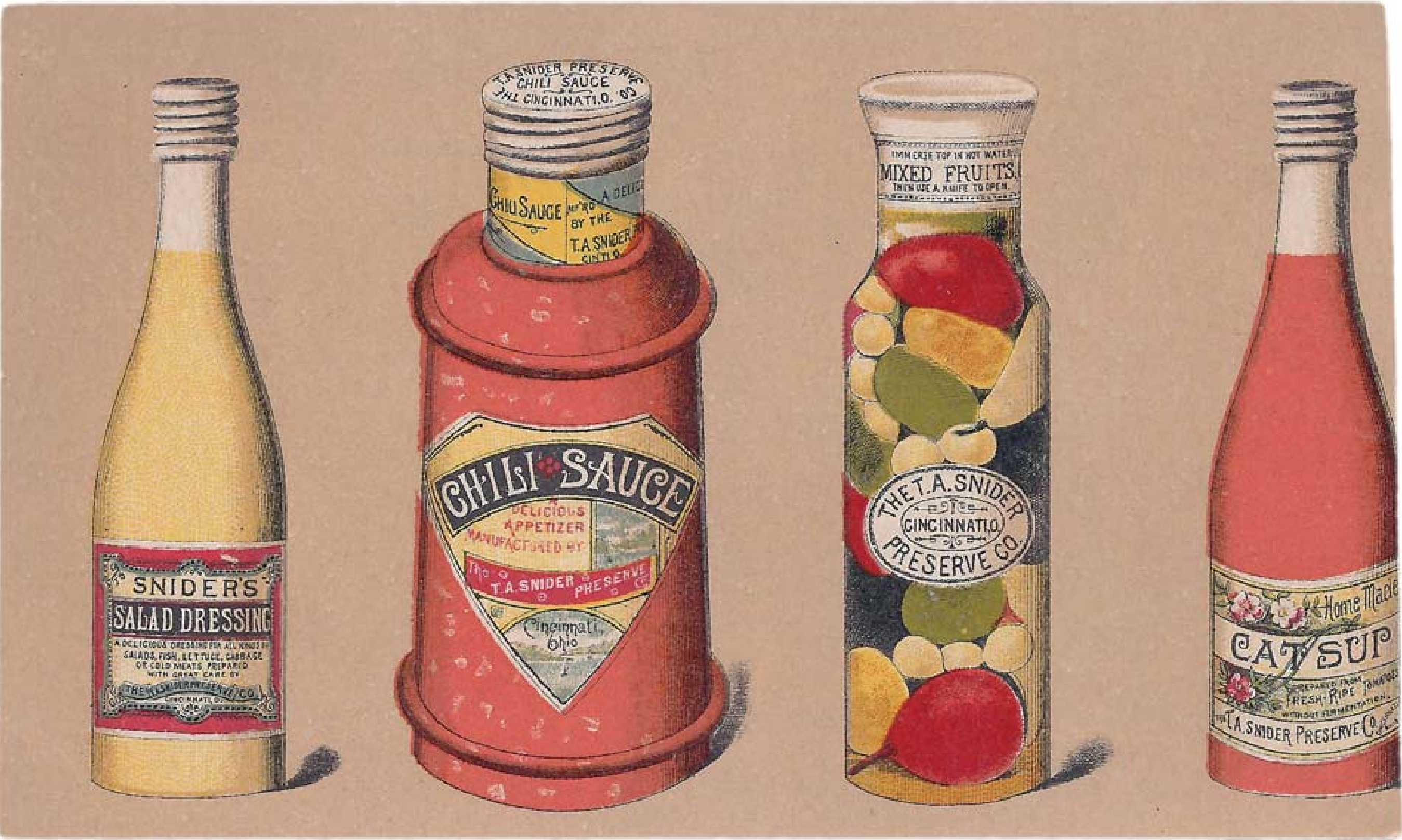
A trade-card from the T. A. Snider Preserve Company, circa 1890; a piece of ephemera showcased in Culinary Ephemera

Designed and composed by Claudia Smelser, the book annotated 352 illustrations of sheet music, business cards, and almanacs, among other ephemera, mostly from Weaver's own collection. The book's thesis argues that ephemera give more insight into the social history of food than cookbooks do.

In The Public Historian, a reviewer described Weaver's prose as "breezy and devoid of jargon", identifying the book as ultimately a success, and at its best as "a snapshot of American culinary history through culinary ephemera". The reviewer found the section on how the American diet differed from diets elsewhere insightful, while disagreeing with Weaver's treatment of gender and race. The book was also reviewed in Gastronomica. While some criticism was given to the inclusion of platitudes and design choices such as justifying text, the review overall judged the book to be a "lovely coffee-table book" that offered a "thoughtful reference". In both reviews, the intended audience was reflected on, with notes that serious collectors may find the lack of bibliography and purchasing advice disappointing.

The book was also reviewed in the Wall Street Journal, and in The Minnesota Star Tribune. It was named "Best Culinary History" book at the 2011 IACP Awards.

==== As American as Shoofly Pie: The Foodlore and Fakelore of Pennsylvania Dutch Cuisine (2013) ====
In 2013, Weaver published Shoofly Pie through the University of Pennsylvania Press. The book covered the cuisine of the Pennsylvania Dutch; both what emerged from cooks in homes, and what emerged as part of the tourist trade, identifying the latter as examples of invented traditions. Like his other books, Weaver here drew upon culinary ephemera—including menus, cookbooks, tourist merchandise—as well as interviews he had conducted over the previous 30 years. The book placed a strong emphasis on debunking popular perceptions about the cuisine.

In the Pennsylvania Magazine of History and Biography, Jennifer Rachel Dutch found Weaver's debunking of invented traditions "powerful", yet identified the book's best part as its coverage of the cuisine that was and had been cooked in the homes of the Pennsylvania Dutch. The presence of recipes Weaver held out as authentic and tasty was particularly appreciated; Dutch described them as a "faithful tribute to the Pennsylvania Dutch".
