= Jane Grigson Award =

Award for authors of cookbooks

The Jane Grigson Award is an award issued by the International Association of Culinary Professionals (IACP). It honours distinguished scholarship and depth of research in cookbooks and is named in honour of the British cookery writer Jane Grigson.

The winners of the award are:

- 1992: Margaret Visser, The Rituals of Dinner
- 1993: Betty Fussell, The Story of Corn: The Myths and History, the Culture and Agriculture, the Art and Science of America's Quintessential Crop
- 1994: William Woys Weaver and Jerry Orabona, Pennsylvania Dutch Country Cooking
- 1995: Elizabeth David and Jill Norman, Harvest of the Cold Months: The Social History of Ice and Ices
- 1996: Sandra L. Oliver, Saltwater Foodways: New Englanders and Their Food, at Sea and Ashore, in the Nineteenth Century
- 1997: Rachel Laudan, The Food of Paradise: Exploring Hawaii's Culinary Heritage
- 1998: William Woys Weaver, Heirloom Vegetable Gardening: A Master Gardener's Guide to Planting, Seed Saving, and Cultural History
- 2001: Jean Andrews, The Pepper Trail: History and Recipes from Around the World
- 2002: Diane Kochilas, The Glorious Foods of Greece: Traditional Recipes from the Islands, Cities, and Villages
- 2002: Stephen Brook and Gary Latham, Bordeaux: People, Power and Politics
- 2004: Paul Bertolli, Cooking by Hand
- 2005: Grace Young and Alan Richardson, The Breath of a Wok: Unlocking the Spirit of Chinese Wok Cooking through Recipes and Lore
- 2006: Marcie Cohen Ferris, Matzoh Ball Gumbo: Culinary Tales of the Jewish South
- 2006: Elizabeth Andoh, Washoku: Recipes from the Japanese Home Kitchen
- 2007: Amy Besa and Romy Dorotan, Memories of Philippine Kitchens: Stories and Recipes from Far and Near
- 2008: Ken Albala, Beans: A History
- 2008: George M. Taber, To Cork or Not to Cork: Tradition, Romance, Science, and the Battle for the Wine Bottle
- 2009: Fuchsia Dunlop, Shark's Fin and Sichuan Pepper: A Sweet-Sour Memoir of Eating in China
- 2011: Greg Marley, Chanterelle Dreams, Amanita Nightmares: The Love, Lore, and Mystique of Mushrooms
- 2011: Peter Menzel and Faith D'Aluisio, What I Eat: Around the World in 80 Diets
- 2012: Barry Estabrook, Tomatoland
- 2012: Stanley Ginsberg and Norman Berg, Inside the Jewish Bakery
- 2013: Anne Willan, Mark Cherniavsky, Kyri Claflin, The Cookbook Library: Four Centuries of the Cooks, Writers, and Recipes That Made the Modern Cookbook
- 2014: Jancis Robinson, Julia Harding & Jose Vouillamoz, Wine Grapes
- 2015: Dave Arnold, Liquid Intelligence: The Art & Science of the Perfect Cocktail
- 2016: Marion Nestle, Soda Politics: Taking On Big Soda (And Winning)
- 2017: Joy Santlofer, Food City: Four Centuries of Food-Making in New York
- 2018: Nathan Myhrvold and Francisco Migoya, Modernist Bread
