= Sauerkraut Yankees =

Nonfiction book by William Woys Weaver

- 1st edition
- Author: William Woys Weaver
- Publisher: University of Pennsylvania Press
- Publication date: 1983
- Pages: 238
- ISBN: 0-8122-7868-2

Sauerkraut Yankees: Pennsylvania-German Foods and Foodways is a 1983 food history book by William Woys Weaver, published by the University of Pennsylvania Press. Weaver wrote Sauerkraut Yankees based on a translation of Die geschickte Hausfrau ('The Handy Housewife'), a Pennsylvania Dutch language cookbook first published in 1848 by Gustav Peters, a printer in Pennsylvania, United States. Weaver reorganized these recipes and provided essays and illustrations to accompany them.

== Writing ==
Sauerkraut Yankees written around a translation of Die geschickte Hausfrau ('The Handy Housewife'). Die geschickte Hausfrau was a Pennsylvania Dutch language cookbook first published in 1848 by Gustav Peters, a printer in Harrisburg, Pennsylvania. Many of its recipes were plagiarized directly or indirectly from other sources, including Mary Randolph's The Virginia House-Wife and Maria Rundell's A New System of Domestic Cookery. By the 1980s, few copies remained.

Weaver first acquired a copy of Die geschickte Hausfrau in the early 1970s, when he had become interested in kitchens and hearths during the completion of his master's thesis on architectural history. In writing Sauerkraut Yankees, Weaver excised the non-culinary content from Die geschickte Hausfrau (covering material such as soap and candle making), and translated the remaining 139 recipes. While in the original text they were arranged in no particular order, Weaver organized the recipes, and accompanied each with an essay. In addition, an introduction, a bibliography, footnotes, 19th-century illustrations, and 19 recipes from other period cookbooks and household manuals were included, covering dishes such as scrapple and sauerkraut which Peters had not included due to his audience's presumed familiarity with their preparations. A foreword was provided by the American folklorist Don Yoder.

At the time of the publication of Sauerkraut Yankees, little scholarly attention had been paid to regional cooking. According to The Christian Science Monitor, the publication of Sauerkraut Yankees established Weaver as "an authority on the food of the region". Along with his previous book A Quaker Woman's Cookbook, Sauerkraut Yankees was well regarded among museum social circles, leading to a series of curator roles. A second edition was published in 2002 by Stackpole Books.

== Reception ==
In Petits Propos Culinaires, Alan Davidson was highly complimentary of Sauerkraut Yankees, giving particular praise to its writing and research. Davidson said the book was "written with verve", making it suitable for both a popular and scholarly readership, and described it as carefully researched and "an important work of scholarship". His favorite sections covered "Siesses un Saueres" (lit. 'the sweets and the sours') and the term "mango"; the same section on mangoes was similarly positively remarked upon in a review in Kirkus Reviews. Other praise for the book's balance of accessibility and scholarship came in Keystone Folklore. There, Yvonne J Milspaw described Weaver's style as witty; "somewhat casual, chatty", and well-researched. Milspaw found Weaver's analysis of the development of foodways among the Pennsylvania Dutch pre-Civil War to be the book's greatest strength. More praise for Weaver's writing and research came from reviewers in Western Folklore and Library Journal. At the end of the year, Richard Sax listed the book in his round up of the best cookbooks of 1983 for Cuisine magazine.

Like other reviewers, Nancy Sahli praised the book's scholarly value, saying in the journal Pennsylvania History "Of Sauerkraut Yankees' value for the student of food folkways and culinary culture in Pennsylvania there can be no doubt." Still, Sahli found the book's adaptation of recipes unsatisfying. To prepare the recipes in the book, the home cook would have to adapt recipes from their hearth-cookery context, and interpret imprecise measures such as "hot" ovens. It would have been better, Sahli opined, if the book included two sets of recipes—an original, and one adapted for the modern kitchen. Other reviewers also commented on how home cooks could prepare meals. In Western Folklore, Jan Anderson complimented Weaver's asides and inclusion of conversion tables between 19th-century and modern units. A more reserved view was offered in Kirkus Reviews, which believed few home cooks would prefer the book's recipes when "considering today's styles and sedentary habits".

== See also ==
- As American as Shoofly Pie – also by Weaver

== Sources ==
- Anderson, Jan (January 1985). "Review: Sauerkraut Yankees". Western Folklore. 44 (1).
- Davidson, Alan (June 1983). "William Woys Weaver: Sauerkraut Yankees". Petits Propos Culinaires. 14.
- Ezell, Johanna (May 1, 1983). "Weaver, William Woys. Sauerkraut Yankees". Library Journal. 108 (9).
- Milspaw, Yvonne J (1983). "Sauerkraut Yankees". Keystone Folklore. 2 (1–2).
- Riely, Elizabeth (April 20, 1988). "He learned from grandmother, an old-fashioned Quaker cook. 'I don't believe in the things professional cooks do'". The Christian Science Monitor. Archived from the original on September 12, 2015.
- Sahli, Nancy (January 1984). "Book Reviews: Sauerkraut Yankees: Pennsylvania German Foods and Foodways, by William Woys Weaver". Pennsylvania History. 51 (1).
- "Sauerkraut Yankees: Pennsylvania-German Foods and Foodways". Kirkus Reviews. April 1, 1983. Archived from the original on June 7, 2026.
- Sax, Richard (December 1983). "The Best of 1983". Cuisine. Vol. 12, no. 12.
- Weaver, Kyle (Fall 2004). "Dishing It Up with William Woys Weaver". Pennsylvania Heritage. Archived from the original on January 28, 2023.
