= Ben Greenman =

American novelist and magazine journalist

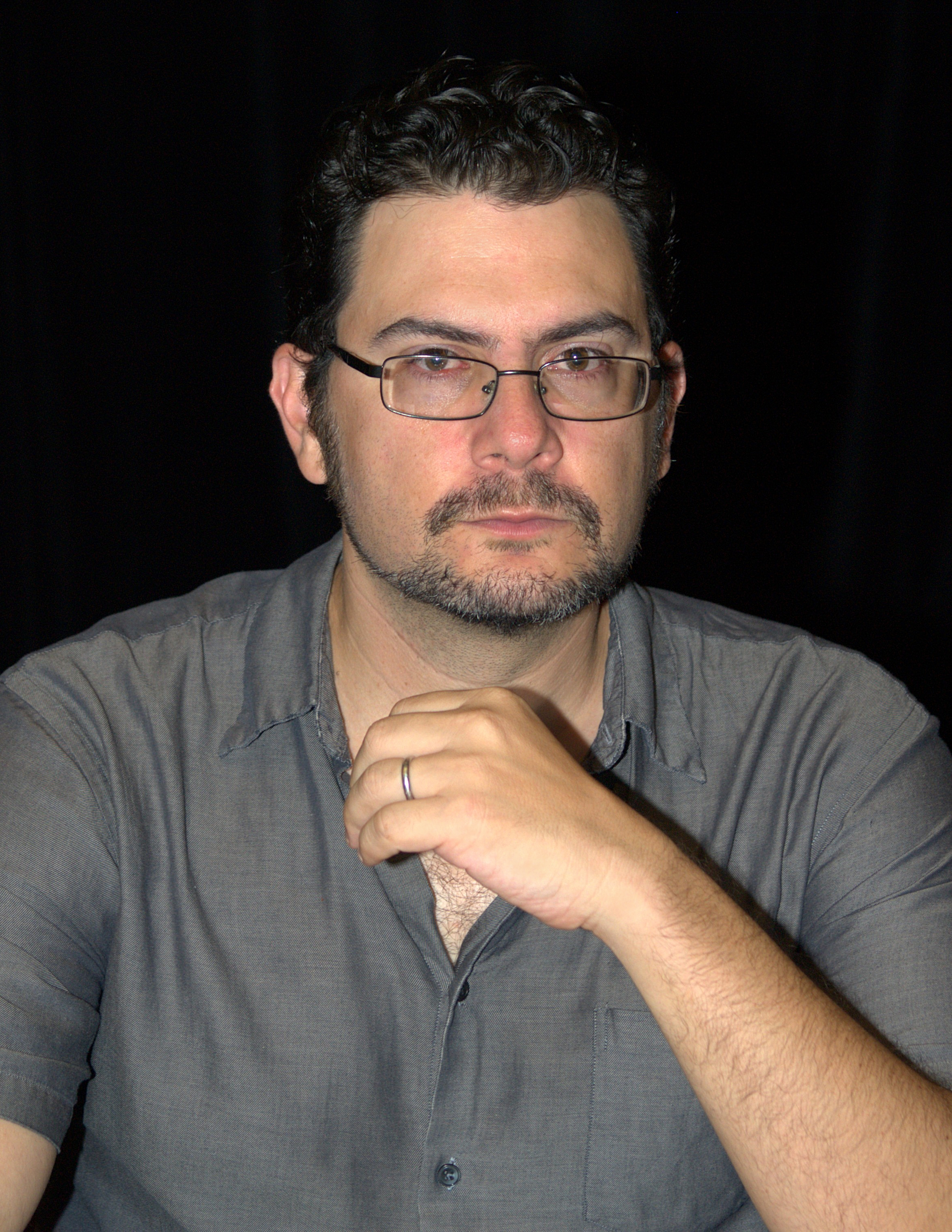
- Greenman at the 2010 Brooklyn Book Festival
- Born: September 28, 1969 (age 56); Chicago, Illinois, U.S.
- Education: Miami Palmetto Senior High School; Yale University; Northwestern University
- Occupation: Novelist
- Spouse: Gail Ghezzi
- Children: 2
- Parent(s): Richard Greenman; Bernadine Heller-Greenman

Ben Greenman (born September 28, 1969) is an American novelist, magazine journalist, and publisher who has written nearly thirty fiction and non-fiction books, including collaborations with pop-music artists like Questlove, George Clinton, Brian Wilson, Gene Simmons, Steven Van Zandt, Sly Stone, and others. His books have been translated into many other languages, including Italian, Japanese, Dutch, and Spanish. From 2000 to 2014, he was an editor at The New Yorker. He now serves as executive editor of Auwa Books, an imprint founded by Questlove in collaboration with Farrar, Straus and Giroux.

== Early life ==
Greenman was born in Chicago, Illinois, to Richard Greenman, an academic physician, and Bernadine Heller-Greenman, an art history professor. He has two younger brothers, Aaron and Josh. He lived briefly in Mountain View, California, and was raised in Miami, where he graduated from Miami Palmetto Senior High School in 1986. He attended Yale University, where he graduated summa cum laude in 1990. After working at Miami New Times, Greenman enrolled in a Ph.D. program in literature at Northwestern University but left after earning his master's degree. He moved to New York City and worked for a variety of book packagers, publishers, and magazines, including Michael Wolff & Company and Yahoo! Internet Life. In 2000, he went to work at The New Yorker, where he was an editor until 2014.

== Books ==
In 2001 McSweeneys published Greenman's debut, Superbad, a collection of humor pieces and serious short fiction that included several satirical musicals. It has the same title as, but not the same contents as, the popular teen comedy; Greenman engaged in a fake feud with Seth Rogen over the title. The book's cover art was a painting by the artist Mark Tansey. Greenman's next book, Superworse, the Novel: A Remix of Superbad, was published in 2004 by Soft Skull, an independent Brooklyn publisher. It refashioned the book into a novel that was overseen and edited by a man named Laurence Once. Kirkus called it "something extraordinary."

In 2007, Macadam/Cage published Greenman's second collection of stories. It was selected by Barnes & Noble for its Discover Great Writers series, and included both comic work and more serious stories like "In the Air Room," which fictionalized the famous controversy over James McNeill Whistler and the Peacock Room. Elizabeth Gold, writing on SFGate, said that "the best of the stories in this collection are more than funny."

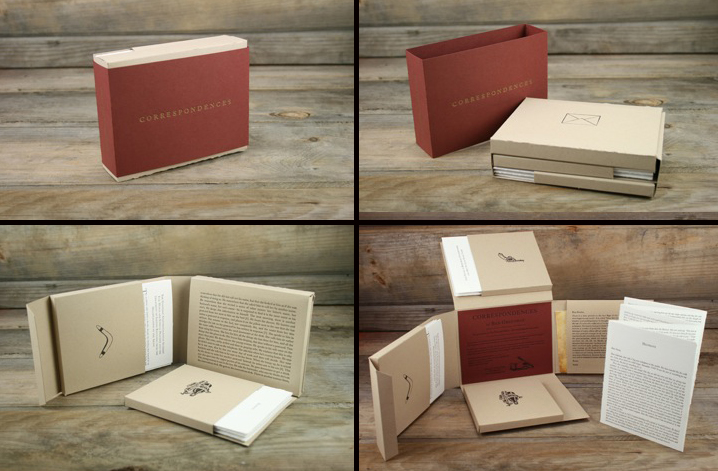
Correspondences

In 2008, Hotel St. George press released a handmade and letterpress-printed edition of Greenman's book Correspondences that included an intricate book casing that unfolded to reveal three accordion books and a postcard. The project was reviewed favorably by the Los Angeles Times and Time Out.

In 2009, Melville House published Greenman's second novel, which was a fictionalized biography of a funk-rock star based loosely on Sly Stone, Marvin Gaye, Curtis Mayfield, and others. The funk-rock star Swamp Dogg recorded a theme song for the book. Later in 2009, Greenman signed with HarperCollins: the first book announced was What He's Poised To Do, an expanded paperback based on the material from Correspondences. The book was praised by Steve Almond in the Los Angeles Times.

In 2010, Greenman adapted the short stories of the Russian master Anton Chekhov, updating them by replacing their characters with modern celebrities. Pop Matters, praising the collection, said "the very, very best of these stories make us weep."

Greenman's novel, The Slippage, was published by Harper Perennial in 2013. The book included a character who was a chart artist and whose work consisted of meta-charts; Greenman created a number of them and posted them at ILoveCharts.com and McSweeneys, among other places. The New York Times praised the novel as "fluid and commanding."

In the summer of 2016, Little A published Emotional Rescue, a collection of essays about pop music and relationships.

== Collaborations ==
Greenman has also collaborated on celebrity memoirs. His most frequent collaborator has been Questlove; he co-wrote the hip-hop memoir Mo Meta Blues (2014), a food-themed book called Something to Food About (2015), a book about creativity and innovation called Creative Quest (2016), a conceptual cookbook called Mixtape Potluck (2018), and two books of music history, Music is History (2021) and Hip-Hop is History (2024). In addition, he wrote memoirs with the funk musician George Clinton, the funk musician Sly Stone, Brian Wilson, co-founder of the Beach Boys, Steven van Zandt, as well as with the actress Mariel Hemingway, Gene Simmons of Kiss, and Simon Cowell of American Idol. The Questlove, Wilson, and Van Zandt books were best-sellers.

== Other work ==
Greenman's journalism and short fiction have appeared in many magazines and newspapers, including The New Yorker, where he worked as an editor from 2000 to 2014, The Paris Review, Zoetrope: All-Story. He has also moderated many events, including Literary Death Match, Literary Upstart, and the National Book Foundation's 5 Under 35 Ceremony.

Greenman is also the executive editor at AUWA Books, a publishing imprint launched by Questlove in 2023.

== Personal life ==
Greenman is married to art director Gail Ghezzi and has two sons: Daniel and Jakob, both of whom were born when the couple lived in Brooklyn. The family currently lives in Ridgewood, New Jersey.

== Bibliography ==
=== Novels ===
- Greenman, Ben (2004). Superworse : the novel : a remix of Superbad : stories and pieces. Brooklyn, NY: Soft Skull Press.
- — (2009). Please Step Back. Brooklyn, NY: Melville House.
- — (2013). The Slippage : a novel. New York: Harper Perennial.
- — (2017). Don Quixotic: a fiction. New York: AntiBookClub.

=== Short fiction ===
Collections

- Greenman, Ben (2001). Superbad : stories and pieces. Brooklyn, NY: McSweeney's Books.
- — (2007). A circle is a balloon and compass both : stories about human love. San Francisco: MacAdam Cage.
- — (2008). Correspondences. Brooklyn, NY: Hotel St. George Press.
- — (2010). Celebrity Chekhov : stories by Anton Chekhov. Translated by Constance Garnett; adapted and celebritized by Ben Greenman. New York: Harper Perennial.
- — (2010). What he's poised to do : stories. New York: Harper Perennial.

=== Non-fiction ===
- Greenman, Ben (2016). Emotional rescue : essays on love, loss, and life – with a soundtrack. Little A.
- — (2017). Dig if you will the picture : funk, sex, God and genius in the music of Prince. New York: Henry Holt.

=== As collaborator ===
- Kiss and Make-Up (with Gene Simmons) (2001)
- I Don't Mean To Be Rude, But... (with Simon Cowell) (2003)
- Mo' Meta Blues (with Questlove) (2013)
- Brothas Be "Yo Like George, Ain't That Funkin' Kind of Hard On You" (with George Clinton) (2014)
- Out Came the Sun (with Mariel Hemingway) (2015)
- Something To Food About (with Questlove) (2016)
- I Am Brian Wilson (with Brian Wilson) (2016)
- Creative Quest (with Questlove) (2018)
- Mixtape Potluck (with Questlove) (2019)
- Unrequited Infatuations (with Steven Van Zandt) (2021)
- Music Is History (with Questlove) (2021)
- Hip-Hop Is History (with Questlove) (2023)
- Thank You (Falletinme Be Mice Elf Agin) (with Sly Stone) (2023)
- This Dog Will Change Your Life (with The Dogist) (2025)

=== Anthologies ===
- Lost Objects: 50 Stories About the Things We Miss and Why They Matter (2022)
- Silent Beaches, Untold Stories (2016)
- Flashed: Sudden Stories in Comics and Prose (2016)
- When I First Held You (2014)
- A Brief History of Authoterrorism (2013)
- Unscrolled (2013)
- Cape Cod Noir (2012)
- Significant Objects: The Book (2012)
- Forty Stories (2012)
- The McSweeneys Book of Politics and Musicals (2012)
- I Love Charts! The Book (2012)
- Blue Christmas (2011)
- Cassette From My Ex (2009)
- Rock and Roll Cage Match (2008)
- Stumbling and Raging: More Politically Inspired (2006)
- Created in Darkness by Troubled Americans (2005)
- The Encyclopedia of Exes: 26 Stories by Men of Love Gone Wrong (2005)
- May Contain Nuts (2005)
- Future Dictionary of America (2004)
- Politically Inspired (2003)
- 101 Damnations (2002)
- More Mirth of a Nation (2002)
- Mirth of a Nation (2000)

=== Essays and reporting ===
- Greenman, Ben (April 5, 2010). "Not left unturned". Goings on About Town. Critic's Notebook. The New Yorker. Vol. 86, no. 8. p. 8.
- — (April 19, 2010). "Harvard lampooner". Goings on About Town. Pop Notes. The New Yorker. Vol. 86, no. 9. p. 20.
- — (January 2, 2012). "A particular place". Goings on About Town. Critic's Notebook. The New Yorker. Vol. 87, no. 42. p. 8.
- — (December 3, 2012). "The Peter Principle". Goings on About Town. Pop Notes. The New Yorker. Vol. 88, no. 38. p. 26.
- — (January 7, 2013). "The Voice". Goings on About Town. Critic's Notebook. The New Yorker. Vol. 88, no. 42. p. 8.
- — (January 14, 2013). "Love and its discontents". Goings on About Town. Pop Notes. The New Yorker. Vol. 88, no. 43. p. 8.
- — (February 11–18, 2013). "Carrie On". Goings on About Town. Critic's Notebook. The New Yorker. Vol. 89, no. 1. p. 14.
- — (March 4, 2013). "Terry Town". Goings on About Town. Pop Notes. The New Yorker. Vol. 89, no. 3. p. 12. Terry Allen.
- — (March 18, 2013). "Wise guys". Goings on About Town. Pop Notes. The New Yorker. Vol. 89, no. 5. p. 15. Robyn Hitchcock and Billy Bragg.
- — (April 8, 2013). "Old souls". Goings on About Town. Pop Notes. The New Yorker. Vol. 89, no. 8. p. 14.
- — (April 15, 2013). "Parallel Parker". Goings on About Town. Critic's Notebook. The New Yorker. Vol. 89, no. 9. p. 17. Graham Parker
- — (April 22, 2013). "Gentle persuasion". Goings on About Town. Pop Notes. The New Yorker. Vol. 89, no. 10. p. 24. Small town talk by Shannon McNally and Dr. John.
- — (May 6, 2013). "Heir supply". Goings on About Town. Critic's Notebook. The New Yorker. Vol. 89, no. 12. p. 6. Cassie Taylor.
- — (May 13, 2013). "The Marshall plan". Goings on About Town. Critic's Notebook. The New Yorker. Vol. 89, no. 13. p. 11. Marshall Crenshaw.
- — (June 3, 2013). "General Patton". Goings on About Town. Critic's Notebook. The New Yorker. Vol. 89, no. 16. p. 6. Mike Patton.
- — (June 10–17, 2013). "Direction home". Goings on About Town. Pop Notes. The New Yorker. Vol. 89, no. 17. p. 28.
- — (July 1, 2013). "Hitting the mark". Goings on About Town. Pop Notes. The New Yorker. Vol. 89, no. 19. p. 9. Mark Mulcahy.
- — (July 8–15, 2013). "Spree historic". Goings on About Town. Critic's Notebook. The New Yorker. Vol. 89, no. 20. p. 19. Tim DeLaughter.
- — (August 5, 2013). "Bonus tracks". Goings on About Town. Pop Notes. The New Yorker. Vol. 89, no. 23. p. 12. Glen Campbell.
- — (November 25, 2013). "World on a string : Jonathan Richman is an old-fashioned troubadour". Goings on About Town. Night Life. The New Yorker. Vol. 89, no. 38. p. 18.
- — (December 2, 2013). "British invasion : a legendary record store arrives in Brooklyn". Goings on About Town. Night Life. The New Yorker. Vol. 89, no. 39. p. 17.
- — (April 21, 2014). "Hunter and collector : a British singer-songwriter's unconventional remedies for heartbreak". Goings on About Town. Night Life. The New Yorker. Vol. 90, no. 9. p. 22.
- — (April 22, 2002). "Rock Solid : The White Stripes, the Strokes, and the Hives". Pop Music. The New Yorker. Vol. 78, no. 9. p. 204.
