= The Dogist (Instagram account) =

Instagram account created by Elias Weiss Friedman

The Dogist is an Instagram photo-documentary series of dogs from around the world by street photographer Elias Weiss Friedman.

== Background ==
Friedman created the account in October 2013 after he was laid off from his corporate job in brand management and was inspired by street-style posts such as The Sartorialist and popular photoblog Humans of New York. In a 2018 interview with 6sqft, Friedman noted, "That was the first opportunity I had to do something I wanted, instead of doing what I was expected to do ... Social media made all that possible."

== Publications ==
In 2015, Friedman released a book entitled The Dogist: Photographic Encounters with 1000 Dogs. The book was featured on the New York Times Bestseller list. In 2017, Friedman released another book, entitled The Dogist Puppies. In 2025 he released This Dog Will Change Your Life.

== Partnership ==
Featured on the page is The Dogist partnership with several brands, including Korean K9 Rescue, a registered 501(c)(3) nonprofit that focuses on rescuing dogs from puppy mills, dog meat farms, and high kill shelters in South Korea. Rescued dogs are transported to New York City, where they are found homes in the tri-state area. Friedman highlights several of the rescued dogs on the Dogist account. In addition, The Dogist partners with a new animal shelter every season. The partnership originates from the #FeedingFriends initiative, an effort to support rescue organizations.

In 2016, a short documentary film entitled The Dogist directed by E.J McLeavey-Fisher was released, with a run time of six minutes.

== See also ==
- Michael Abber
- Instagram face
