= The Larder Invaded =

Food history exhibition (1986–1988)

The Larder Invaded by William Smith

The Larder Invaded: Reflections on Three Centuries of Philadelphia Food and Drink was an exhibit put on at the Library Company of Philadelphia and Historical Society of Pennsylvania between November 1986 and April 1987. It was a joint project of the two institutions, and was curated by Mary Anne Hines and Gordon Marshall of the Library Company with guest curator William Woys Weaver. The exhibit was later shown in the Campbell Museum of Camden, New Jersey.

== Exhibit ==
The idea for The Larder Invaded emerged from discussions between Weaver and Hines and Marshall, when the extent of the Library Company's food-history related holdings became apparent. It was prepared over six months, a short time for curating an exhibit. 1152 items were featured, including 255 pieces of artworks and 250 books and pamphlets, sourced from the institution's collections, as well as collectors, local businesses and others. (Note: A later piece in the Courier-Post reported there 1,400 items being on display in the original showing.) Some of the items were supplied by Weaver himself, drawing on his personal collection. The name of the exhibit came from a lithograph made by a William Smith who had lived in Philadelphia historically, which depicted a dog and a cat in a pantry full of produce and meats as they stared at each other.

Pieces were displayed over six sections in 4,500 square feet (420 m^{2}) of gallery space. Items—cookbooks, prints, portraits, and epherema—were contained in display cases in winding hallways, that broke intermittently into open areas. Exhibits were accompanied by small, typed labels; according to the curators, these were kept concise "in the hope that, properly arranged, the number of items and their variety will tell our story for us", a necessity when dealing with a sparse secondary literature. This story, argued its curators, was that the cuisine of Pennsylvania emerged from a range of factors such as technology and ecology, and that it had been particularly influential on America's national cuisine, particularly in the 19th century through several publications released by chefs of the area.

In the first section, patrons were shown images and facts on Philadelphia, depicting subjects such as people fishing for shad on the Delaware River, and statistics on local ice cream production. The second section was titled "The Larder Supplied", and focused on food marketing ephemera, giving particular emphasis to immigrant and Afro-American merchants, supermarkets and street vendors, and less to large local food production of beef and grain milling. The exhibit proceeded into the third section, "Fat, Lean, and In-Between", which portrayed exhibits related to eating habits. Much of this came through restaurant menus and advertisements, as well as some documents from historial institutions.

The fourth section covered beverages, giving substantial coverage to alcohol consumption and manufacture, with broad coverage on non-alcoholic beverages as well, such as 19th century soda-fountain catalogues. The penultimate section covered home cooking, and was split between coverage of prescriptive literature and documents on domestic studies, and documentation on preservation technology. Finally, Philadelphia's food reform history was depicted, exhibiting items relating to temperance and vegetarianism.

By August 1988, the exhibit was on display at the Campbell Museum of Camden, New Jersey, and was set to remain there into November. It was curated by Weaver with guest curator Catherine Wilford, and had cut the number of exhibits down to 200 items.

== Books ==
To accompany the release of The Larder Invaded, two texts were published: The Larder Invaded: Three Centuries of Philadelphia Food and Drink that covered a selection of the catalogue, and a spinoff, 35 Receipts from the Larder Invaded, including recipes from the exhibit. Weaver tested these recipes in his kitchen, and supplied notes on how the preparations could be adapted by modern cooks. Microfiche of the exhibits labels is included in The Larder Invaded.

Writing in the mid-1990s, the food historian Susan Williams gave the pair of texts strong praise. She described them as "stand[ing] as a model" for research into historic American foodways, giving additional praise to illustrations and inclusion of microfiche.

== Reviews ==
Anne Willan described the exhibit as "charming". A more in-depth evaluation was given by Judith A McGaw in the journal Technology and Culture. While finding the exhibition necessarily limited by the minimal research that had been conducted in the area and the nature of evidence on food history, (Note: She writes, quoting from the accompanying book: "If the proof of the pudding is in the eating, culinary historians have had their "best evidence... eaten by its creators", the surviving record lacks the gustatory and olefactory data that tells us most about food.") she found The Larder Invaded was an important work, saying "Hines, Marshall, and Weaver... deserve high praise for showing us this much about the history of food and for revealing how much remains to be seen.

A profile of the exhibition in the Gloucester County Times described the accompanying book of The Larder Supplied as "charmingly illustrated".

== See also ==
- Cuisine of Philadelphia
- History of Philadelphia

== Sources ==
- McGaw, Judith A (April 1988). "Food for Thought in Philadelphia: "The Larder Invaded"". Technology and Culture. 29 (2). doi:10.1353/tech.1988.0142.
- Williams, Susan (1996). Savory Suppers and Fashionable Feasts: Dining in Victorian America. Knoxville: University of Tennessee Press. ISBN 0-87049-912-2.
