= Shaun MacDonald =

Shaun MacDonald or McDonald may refer to:

- Shaun McDonald (American football) (born 1981), American football player
- Shaun McDonald (darts player) (born 1985), Scottish darts player
- Shaun MacDonald (footballer, born 1988), Welsh football midfielder
- Shaun McDonald (rugby union) (born 1989), South African rugby union player
- Shaun MacDonald (footballer, born 1996), English football goalkeeper

== See also ==
- Shauna MacDonald (disambiguation)
- Shawn McDonald (born 1977), American musician
- Sean McDonald, American publishing executive
- Sean Macdonald (born 2000), Australian basketball player
