= Thank You (Falettinme Be Mice Elf Agin) (book) =

Autobiography of Sly Stone

- Author: Sly Stone
- Language: English
- Genre: Autobiography
- Publisher: Auwa Books
- Publication date: October 17, 2023

Thank You (Falettinme Be Mice Elf Agin) is the autobiography of American musician Sly Stone, written with Ben Greenman. It was published in October 2023 by Auwa Books and included a foreword from Questlove.

Announced in May 2023, the book was the first to be published by new US imprint Auwa Books, and was published in the UK by White Rabbit.

== Reception ==
In their review for the Los Angeles Times, Marc Weingarten wrote that "Stone provides tantalizing crumbs of insight into his oeuvre...[but] never really digs too deep into his life or art; he’s content to skim over the surface."

Christopher Weber, writing for The Associated Press, said the book "overflows with wit and wordplay befitting a maestro" and contained "no shortage of occasionally humorous — but mostly bleak — backstage tales of debauchery and drug abuse." But Weber felt fans interested in gaining personal insight into the life of Sly Stone would be left disappointed. Similarly, Rob Doyle for The Guardian felt it was "light on revelations" but that Stone's fans would enjoy the details of tours and anecdotes of other pop stars.

Alan Light for The New York Times wrote Stone's book had impossible expectations to fulfil given its subject, but "gives a strong sense of this giant’s voice and sensibility". He felt the inclusion of transcripts from Stone's TV appearances served as padding for a book that "sprints too quickly through his experiences".

Jem Aswad for Variety, praised Stone's wordplay, and especially enjoyed the "electric and exciting" early chapters, but found the second half of the book tough as Stone detailed his addiction and time in jail with "matter-of-fact, unemotional descriptions of truly horrifying events", but that it still finished "on a thankful and thoughtful note". Writing for Slate, Jack Hamilton also found it sometimes a difficult read as it "becomes more of a memoir of addiction than of music-making", but still found it "fascinating, revealing...[and] an unusual, fitfully beautiful, and surprisingly emotional reading experience".
