= Shauna MacDonald =

Shauna MacDonald, Macdonald, or McDonald may refer to:

- Shauna MacDonald (Canadian actress) (born 1970)
- Shauna Macdonald (Scottish actress) (born 1981)
- Shauna McDonald (or Barker), principal clarinetist of the Ottawa Symphony Orchestra

== See also ==
- Shaun MacDonald (disambiguation)
