= Fish pepper =

Cultivar of Capsicum annuum

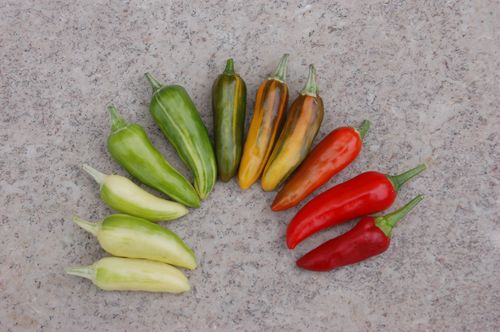
- Species: Capsicum annuum
- Origin: Caribbean
- Heat: Hot
- Scoville scale: 5,000–30,000 SHU

The fish pepper is a small Chili pepper cultivar of the species Capsicum annuum. It is an heirloom variety developed and preserved by African American communities in the Chesapeake. The plant has variegated foliage and its peppers ripen from white with green streaks to a dark red color. The fish pepper has a wide range of pungency, with Scoville scores from 5,000 to 30,000 units. The pepper was thought to be extinct for the better part of the 20th century until the rediscovery of fifty-year-old seeds in the family freezer of William Woys Weaver.

== History ==
=== Background ===
Capsicum annuum is a species of the plant in the family solanacea. Its origins are obscure, but it is believed to have been native to southern Mexico, where its center of diversity is found. Being cultivated by Mesoamerican societies since roughly 8000 BCE, it later spread throughout most of southern North America and South America. By the time of Columbus's arrival in the Americas, cultivation had been noted in the Caribbean.

=== Origin and historical use ===
From the Caribbean, it made its way to the Chesapeake where it was noted to have been grown by enslaved Africans in Baltimore. Food historian Michael W. Twitty believes them to have originally have been brought by Haitians. By 1870, particularly in Baltimore and in Philadelphia, the pepper became a popular ingredient among the Black community. It was commonly used in many crab houses and oyster bars (hence the name "fish pepper"). The fish pepper's rare trait of albinism was highly valued by chefs because the use of the peppers in their albino phase of ripening allowed white foods such as cream of crab soup to be spiced without affecting the color of the final dish. Due to urbanization, fish peppers declined in popularity during the early 20th century, eventually disappearing from restaurant menus, marketplaces and the catalogs of seed vendors.

=== Rediscovery ===
The cultivar was saved from extinction thanks to a barter made by Horace Pippin in the 1940s. Pippin was a Black folk painter who lived in Pennsylvania. He traded seeds to a local beekeeper named H. Ralph Weaver in exchange for Weaver's celebrated bee sting therapy, used to treat Pippin's arthritis. The seeds stayed in the Weaver family freezer for fifty years, until 1995 when Weaver's grandson, William Woys Weaver, discovered the seeds and sent them to the Seed Savers Exchange. The Exchange reconstituted the pepper seeds and cultivated the first fish pepper seedlings in half a century. Since their resurrection, the fish pepper has regained its former popularity and is readily available from seed websites and once again sees regular use in dishes at Mid-Atlantic restaurants.

== Description ==
The color of the fruit range from green, orange, brown, white and red, being spicy and hot. The cultivar is celebrated for its unusual foliage. The plants have striking white and green mottled leaves, making the variety as valued as an ornamental in landscaping as it is in the kitchen for its unusual fruits. As they grow, the fruit's color varies greatly, progressing from a creamy white albinism to a deep blood red when mature. Fish peppers are typically hot peppers, and their heat can range from 5,000 to 30,000 on the Scoville scale. The peppers grow to roughly 1.5 to 2 inches (3.8 to 5.1 cm) in length, with the plant itself growing to roughly 2 feet (61 cm) in height.

== See also ==
- List of Capsicum cultivars
- Sea island red peas
- Carolina gold rice
