= The Dogist =

- Promotional image
- Directed by: E.J. McLeavey-Fisher
- Produced by: Static Age Inc.
- Starring: Elias Weiss Friedman
- Cinematography: Nathan Lynch
- Edited by: Erik Auli
- Release date: 2016
- Running time: 6 minutes
- Country: United States
- Language: English

The Dogist is a 2016 short documentary film directed by E.J. McLeavey-Fisher about a project run by the street photographer Elias Weiss in which he takes pictures of dogs in New York City. The project was named The Dogist. Director McLeavey-Fisher learned about the project on Instagram. The documentary was shot in three separate sessions in 2015.

== Synopsis ==
Friedman walks around in New York asking dog owners if he can take pictures of their dogs. By playing and connecting with them, Friedman is able to capture the perfect shot to exhibit their personality and style. He sometimes adds the bottom half of their owner to show the relationship between them.

== History ==
The Dogist was first introduced on Instagram. Weiss claims to have drawn his inspiration from The Sartorialist and Humans of New York.
