= Margaret Visser =

Canadian writer and broadcaster

- Born: May 11, 1940 (age 86)
- Occupations: writer, broadcaster, academic
- Known for: widely cited expert on the etiquette of dining

Margaret Visser (born May 11, 1940) is a Canadian writer and broadcaster who lives in Toronto, Paris, and South West France. Her subject matter is the history, anthropology, and mythology of everyday life.

== Biography ==
Born in South Africa, she attended school in Zambia, Zimbabwe, France (the Sorbonne) and the University of Toronto where she earned a PhD in Classics.

Visser taught Greek and Latin at York University in North York, Toronto for 18 years. For several years Visser regularly appeared on the Canadian Broadcasting Corporation's popular radio program Morningside in conversations with Peter Gzowski. Her writing has won many awards, including the Glenfiddich Award for Food Book of the Year in Britain in 1989, the International Association of Culinary Professionals' Literary Food Writing Award, and the Jane Grigson Award. Visser delivered the 2002 CBC Massey Lectures. Her topic was "Beyond Fate."

Visser is married to Colin Visser, professor emeritus of the English Department of the University of Toronto.

In 2017, Visser's 1992 book, The Rituals of Dinner was re-issued, on her birthday, and The Guardian's review of it noted her wry humour. The review noted "Twenty-five years after its first publication, Visser’s book remains a delightful guide to how we eat, and why it matters."

In 2018, the Washington Post cited Visser, on the etiquette of cannibalism, from her 1992 book on dining manners, The Rituals of Dinner, when reporting on the bizarre case of a California high school girl who claimed she served her classmates cookies that contained her grandfather's ashes.

In September, 2019, Visser was one of the experts interviewed for a documentary on what recent archeological discoveries say about Mayan dining habits.

== Publications ==
- Margaret Visser (1986). Much Depends on Dinner: The Extraordinary History and Mythology, Allure and Obsessions, Perils and Taboos, of an Ordinary Meal. Grove Press. ISBN 9781443403702., OCLC 820146147
- Margaret Visser (1992). The Rituals Of Dinner: The Origins, Evolution, Eccentricities, and Meaning of Table Manners. HarperCollins. ISBN 9781443417327.
- Margaret Visser (2000). Geometry Of Love. HarperCollins. ISBN 9781443403696.
- Margaret Visser (2000). The Way We Are: Collected Essays. HarperCollins. ISBN 9781443403719.
- Margaret Visser (2002). Beyond Fate: CBC Massey lectures series. House of Anansi. ISBN 9780887846793.
- Margaret Visser (2008). The Gift of Thanks: The Roots and Rituals of Gratitude. HMH. ISBN 9780547428444.
