= Roughwood (Easttown Township, Pennsylvania) =

Historic house in Pennsylvania, United States

- U.S. National Register of Historic Places
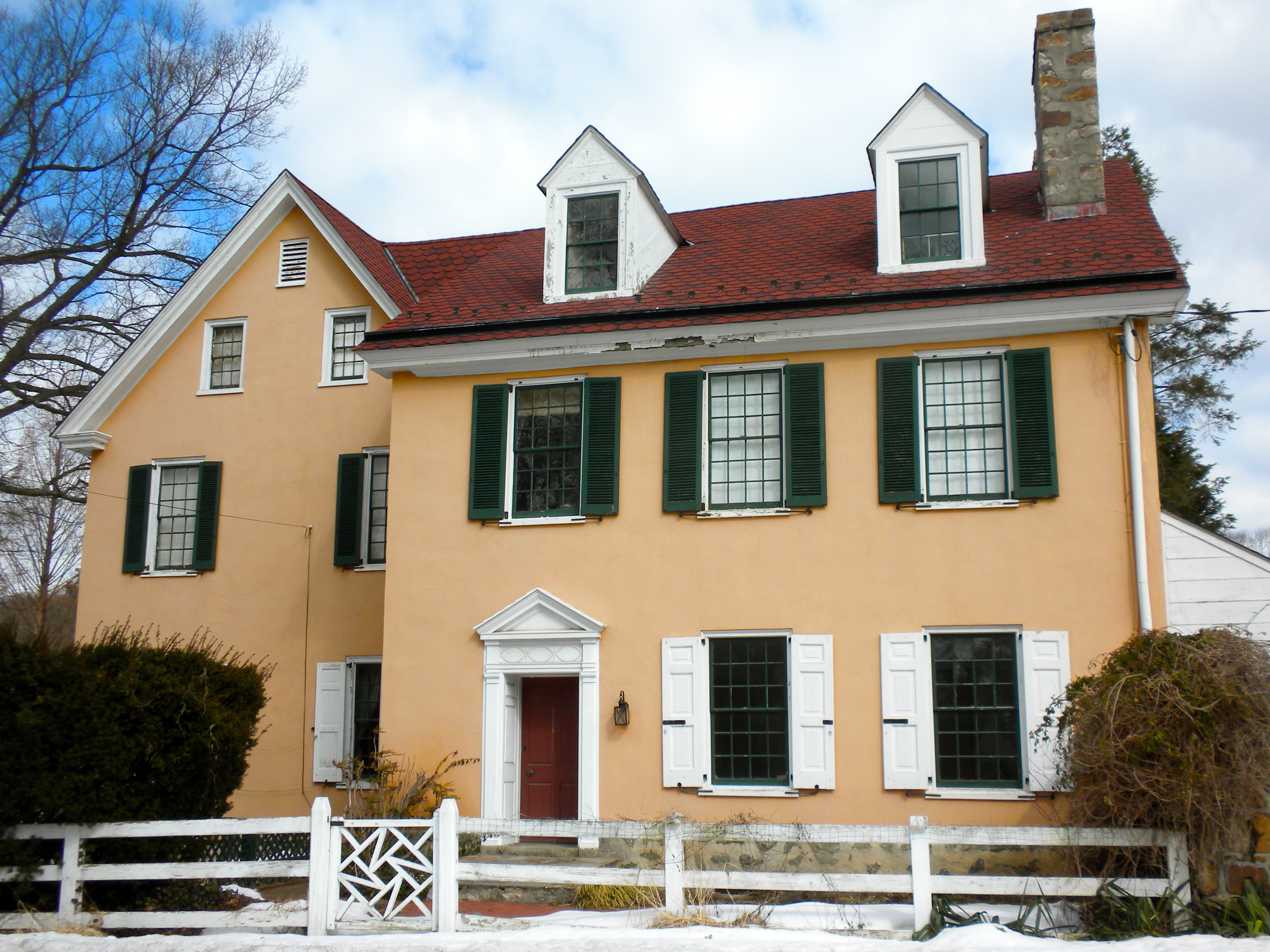
- Front of Roughwood

- Location within Pennsylvania Location within the United States
- Location: 107 Old Lancaster Rd., Devon, Pennsylvania
- Coordinates: 40°2′58″N 75°25′18″W
- Built: 1805, 1819, 1821-1822, 1928
- Architect: Multiple
- Architectural style: Federal
- NRHP reference No.: 84000318
- Added to NRHP: November 23, 1984

Roughwood, originally known as Lamb's Tavern, is an historic home that is located in Devon, Easttown Township, Chester County, Pennsylvania, United States.

It was added to the National Register of Historic Places in 1984.

== History and architectural features ==
This historic structure consists of three sections. The oldest section was built in 1819, on the foundations of an earlier log structure that dates to circa 1805. It was built using green serpentine ashlar and was coated in stucco. The dining room wing was added between 1821 and 1822, when the house was used as a tavern. The third wing is the kitchen wing, with later service room additions.

The house has a number of Federal-style details. It was extensively renovated and modernized in 1928, under the direction of architect R. Brognard Okie (1875-1945).
