= Auwa Books =

American publishing imprint

- Parent company: Farrar, Straus and Giroux
- Founded: 2023
- Founder: Questlove
- Country of origin: United States
- Publication types: books
- Official website: auwabooks.com

Auwa Books is a publishing imprint founded by Questlove in 2023.

== History ==
Auwa Books was announced in March 2023 as a new imprint of American book publishing company Farrar, Straus and Giroux. The name Auwa is taken from a bird-call noise heard in Prince songs "Baby I'm a Star" and "Eye No".

The imprint's first publication was Thank You (Falettinme Be Mice Elf Agin), an autobiography by Sly Stone written with Ben Greenman published 17 October 2023. Auwa published its second book, Hip-Hop Is History, authored by Questlove and Greenman, in 2024. Subsequent titles include works by Drew Afualo and Derrick Palmer. Upcoming titles include work by Josh Luber and potential pieces by signed authors Hanif Abdurraqib, Wesley Morris, and Jacqueline Woodson.

== Staff ==
Publisher and editor-in-chief - Questlove

Senior vice president and editorial director - Alexis Rosenzweig

Executive editors - Malaika Adero and Ben Greenman
