= As American as Shoofly Pie =

2013 book by William Woys Weaver

- First edition cover
- Author: William Woys Weaver
- Cover artist: William Woys Weaver
- Language: English
- Subject: Pennsylvania Dutch cuisine, culinary tourism
- Genre: Food history, cookbook
- Publisher: University of Pennsylvania Press
- Publication date: 2013
- Publication place: United States
- Media type: Print (hardcover and paperback), digital (eBook)
- Pages: 318
- ISBN: 978-0-8122-4479-3

As American as Shoofly Pie: The Foodlore and Fakelore of Pennsylvania Dutch Cuisine is a 2013 nonfiction book by the American food historian William Woys Weaver, published by the University of Pennsylvania Press.

Based on three decades of fieldwork, archival research, and roughly sixty kitchen-tested recipes, Weaver documents the history of Pennsylvania Dutch cuisine and separates a long-established regional cookery from the tourist "fakelore" that came to be attributed to the Old Order Amish during the 1930s. He argues that much of the food associated with Pennsylvania Dutch tourism (among it gluey shoofly pie, the "Amish table," and the "seven sweets and seven sours") was invented for commercial purposes, and that the unifying thread of the genuine cuisine is sauerkraut.

The book generated attention in national media and was reviewed in academic journals of food studies, American culture, and regional history.

== Background ==
According to Weaver, the project developed from his fieldwork among Pennsylvania Dutch cooks, whom he interviewed for their "food memories." He said that he had recorded interviews with more than 220 people over roughly thirty years, sifting their recollections to identify which dishes belonged to the core regional cuisine, and that this method led him to conclude that sauerkraut was the common thread tying the culture together. The recordings are now archived at the Pennsylvania German Cultural Heritage Center at Kutztown University as a record of his fieldwork.

Weaver pointed out that several publishers had been reluctant to take on the manuscript because they assumed it was "a book about the Amish," and that he had to insist the subject was food tourism and the Pennsylvania Dutch in general rather than about the Amish, who he said make up only a small fraction of the Pennsylvania Dutch population. He designed the book's cover himself, using tourist kitsch as "bait" to pull readers in, and chose a red, white, and blue hex sign to underscore his argument that Pennsylvania Dutch culture is an American creation rather than "Germany imported to America."

Weaver described the roughly sixty recipes in the book as a "basic training ground" that he had selected from thousands gathered in the field, and said he hoped the book would encourage chefs to take the cuisine in a high-end direction. He mentioned beginning to work with the Pennsylvania chef Andrew Little, Adam Diltz and others toward that end. He added that the book was selling well among the Pennsylvania Dutch themselves, who considered it as a kind of vindication of what they had long thought was true to the culture.

== Summary ==
The book uses food to get at the history and identity of the Pennsylvania Dutch, descendants of German- and Swiss-speaking immigrants who settled southeastern and central Pennsylvania. Weaver splits the subject in two. On one side is a regional cuisine of more than sixteen hundred documented dishes, spread over an area he likens in size to Switzerland. On the other, what he calls "fakelore": dishes and customs fabricated by local-color novelists, travel writers, and the tourist trade, then passed off as the cooking of the Old Order Amish. He starts with Dutchified, the Pennsylvania Dutch term for anything "gussied up to look, taste, or in some way made to appear Pennsylvania Dutch whether or not it really is." The subject, in his phrase, is "food in motion, food moving from old forms toward new identities."

Weaver then divides the cuisine by class and region. The "Hasenpfeffer Dutch," the urban and rural well-to-do, kept a table of wine, game, and rich dishes such as sour-marinated rabbit, sustained by a Swabian "dumpling gentry" who ran the hotels and wine houses on the edges of towns such as Reading. Against them he sets the "Buckwheat Dutch," the rural poor, who subsisted on buckwheat, foraged greens, small game, and frugal one-pot dishes such as "hairy" dumplings. Their cooking seldom appeared in cookbooks or tourist literature. He reminds readers that there is no single Pennsylvania Dutch cuisine, only a composite of many local foodways, varying from county to county and from one religious group to another.

Tourism, Weaver argues, turned a handful of dishes into icons and assembled the mythic "Amish table." He traces the process to the dialect revival that followed the American Civil War, to local-color fiction by writers such as Helen Reimensnyder Martin and Elsie Singmaster, and to the German Village, a Lancaster restaurant that traded its Bavarian rathskeller theme for Amish imagery in the mid-1930s. He ties the rise of the Amish as a symbol to anti-German sentiment, American isolationism, and Adolf Hitler's ascent. For the Pennsylvania Dutch, anxious about being identified with Germany, a pacifist and plainly American farming people provided a useful emblem. Shoofly pie, he contends, was a hybrid first served as a "Centennial cake" in 1876. Chicken and waffles, funnel cakes, and the "seven sweets and seven sours" were either commercial inventions or older foods reinvented for visitors.

Sauerkraut is Weaver's unifying thread. He calls it the "cabbage curtain": an invisible but durable border marking who remains culturally Pennsylvania Dutch, since households that still eat it tend to keep the pork dishes and other traditional foods that go with it. He devotes a chapter to the Kutztown Folk Festival, founded in 1950 as the first American folklife festival. The festival, he argues, unintentionally spread three emblems now taken to be quintessentially Pennsylvania Dutch: the Amish as shorthand for the whole culture, the painted disk hex signs popularized by the restaurateur Johnny Ott, and the funnel cake, which a women's grange concession turned from a holiday rarity into a fairground staple.

Weaver ends with a "New Dutch cuisine" and what he calls "the greening of the Amish": young Pennsylvania Dutch cooks, sustainable-agriculture advocates, and high-end chefs reviving frugal, locally grown peasant fare. The cookery diverged from its southwest German roots long ago, he argues, and now stands as far from German cuisine "as Mexican cooking is from Spanish." The final third of the volume gathers roughly sixty recipes, each with notes on its origins. A glossary of Pennsylvania Dutch food terms follows.

== Reviews ==
For Jennifer Martin the book was groundwork for the study of regional American foodways beyond the well-documented South. Weaver sets the meat-laden tables of the affluent against the buckwheat dishes of the poorest Pennsylvania Dutch, and the account of those poverty foods takes up a class of eaters that cookbooks and the popular press usually pass over. Gender comes in through the all-male Grundsau lodges and the women's lodge that followed. The prose is "straightforward, journalistic," the book "an important addition to the work surrounding food studies."

Molly Taylor-Poleskey found in the author, a thirteenth-generation Pennsylvania Dutchman, an intimacy "inaccessible to outsiders." But he writes as if readers share it, and that breeds confusion. She wanted an opening account of the German regions of origin and a map of the counties, and traced the book's "organizational inconsistencies" to the sprawl of its subregions. Specialists will find plenty in its decades of research; food studies scholars less, since the book skips the field's current debates, draws no wider lessons about American food, and cites one scholar from outside Pennsylvania Dutch studies. She wrote that it "accomplishes its objectives" and hoped for a growing food preservationist movement.

The book's "most important contribution," Jennifer Rachel Dutch wrote, is the recovery of home cooking: what Pennsylvania Dutch households cooked and ate, not the tourist fare. She found the case against invented traditions persuasive and welcomed the return of dishes that had vanished from cookbooks and restaurants.

Beth E. Graybill praised the "fascinating detail" drawn from restaurant menus, recipe books, and cookbooks, and from interviews with historians, Amish cooks, and Pennsylvania Dutch restaurant owners. That breadth of primary material is the study's strength and a counterweight to the tourist image of the cuisine.
