= Jean Andrews =

Jean Andrews (1923 – 7 January, 2010) also self titled the 'Pepper Lady,' was an American naturalist, author and educator. She was born in 1923 and attended boarding school till the age of sixteen, when she graduated in 1940. She was best known for her work on the shells and shores of Texas, as well as her books on wildflowers and peppers. She died on 7 January, 2010 at the age of 86. According to her friends, Andrews signature phrase was, "Well, I can't stand to have anything if I don't know about it, and one thing led to another."

== Early life ==
Jean Andrews was born in Kingsville, Texas in 1923 to Herbert and Katharine Keith (Smith) Andrews. Beginning at a young age, she spent time collecting wild peppers also called chiltepins, which are native to South Texas. She traveled to many countries during her lifetime, the first was for her honeymoon to Mexico in 1944. While on her honeymoon she discovered her newfound passion of seashells, which inspired her to start a collection of shells.

== Education ==
She attended the Texas A&I University in her hometown, but later transferred to the University of Texas and earned a bachelor's degree in home economics in 1944. She went on to receive a Master's degree in Education at Texas A&I.

At the age of 50, Andrews returned to school seeking a PhD in Art in which she received her PhD from the University of North Texas. Andrews had previously given up painting due to the sudden death of her daughter, Jinxy, who had died in a car crash. Jean ("Jinxy") was an up and coming artist before her death. In order to honor her child, Andrews decided to continue painting in a move she called the 'Jinxy Principle.' Andrews graduated with her PhD in 1976.

== Career and research ==
Andrews returned to Texas and began collecting seashells at Corpus Christi in 1959. After learning how to scuba dive, she set out to explore many of the world's famous coastline including the Philippines, The Great Barrier Reef, Canary Islands, Panama, Costa Rica, and the Red Sea, collecting shells from around the world. Andrews was able to collect around 20,000 specimens and around 900 different species of shells. Her collection would come to be known as 'The Jean Andrews Recent Marine Seashell Collection' which is now held at the Texas Memorial Museum. Using this research Andrews published the Sea Shells of the Texas Coast in 1971. The book had photos of the shells with the description which was the first book on shells to have such a format.

Andrews had an obsession with chilies from a young age and became a self taught botanist. She grew her own peppers and eventually published her first of many books on peppers titled Peppers: The Domesticated Capsicums. Andrews painted all of the images for this book, spending around 40 hours a week painting the peppers. She then took her fascination with peppers global and began traveling the world in search of new chilies to grow by herself and experiment with in her cooking. Publishing The Pepper Trail: History and Recipes from Around the World in 1999.

== Later life and legacy ==
In 1991, Andrews was named as a Distinguished alumni at the University of Texas, she was the first woman to receive such an award in Natural Science at the university. Andrews was named as a Distinguished alumni at both University of Texas (1997) and University of North Texas (1991). As well as the first woman to be named at the Hall of Honor in the College of Natural Sciences at the University of Texas in 1991.

Andrews was an embroiderer since her childhood, which helped set up and fund an artisan group in Costa Rica called the Cooperative Artesania Santa Elena y Monteverde. This group allowed 150 women to make fabrics to achieve financial and personal independence.

She established two fellowships at the University of Texas, these allowed for professors to travel to the university to give lectures and share their knowledge with students. She also created four scholarships in honor of her children.

== Published works ==
- Sea Shells of the Texas Coast (1971)
- Shells and Shores of Texas. (1977)
- Texas Shells: A Field Guide (1981)
- Peppers: the Domesticated Capsicums (1984, revised in 1995)
- The Texas Bluebonnet (1986, revised in 1993)
- An American Wildflower Florilegium (1992)
- A Field Guide to Shells of the Texas Coast (1992)
- Red Hot Peppers: A Cookbook for the Not-So-Faint of Heart (1993)
- Field Guide to the Shells of the Florida Coast (1994)
- The Pepper Lady's Pocket Pepper Primer (1998)
- The Pepper Trail: History & Recipes From Around the World. (1999)
