= Uncanny Valley (memoir) =

2020 memoir by Anna Wiener

Uncanny Valley: A Memoir
- First edition cover
- Author: Anna Wiener
- Cover artist: Rodrigo Corral
- Language: English
- Publisher: MCD Books
- Publication date: 14 January 2020
- Publication place: United States
- Media type: Print (hardcover), e-book
- Pages: 288
- ISBN: 978-0-374-27801-4 (hardcover)
- OCLC: 1129203453
- Dewey Decimal: 338.4/760979473 B
- LC Class: HC107.C2 H5335 2020

Uncanny Valley is a 2020 memoir by writer Anna Wiener. The book focuses on Wiener's transition from the publishing industry to a series of jobs at technology companies, and her gradual disillusionment with the technology industry.

== Summary ==
The book details Wiener's decision to quit her job as a freelance copy editor and literary agency assistant in New York in order to move to Silicon Valley in San Francisco. Wiener, who felt restricted by the publishing industry's restrictive norms and shrinking revenue, feels out of place amongst the tech executives and engineers in her new surroundings yet content with her rising wage and generous work benefits. After switching between several companies, she finally settles on the open-source coding company GitHub as a customer service representative. Despite the demeaning nature of her work and the stressful nature of investigating potentially inflammatory or illegal posts on the site, she decides to remain due to the company's various perks, such as being able to work from home. Throughout the book, Wiener ruminates about the moral implications of data collection and manipulation amongst technology firms.

== Background and composition ==
Wiener moved to San Francisco from New York City at the age of 25 to pursue a job in the tech industry. Upon arriving, she had few friends, and corresponded over email with friends still in New York. Wiener also emailed herself notes about amusing conversations or interactions she overheard or witnessed and saved them in a folder she dubbed "Notes to Self". These emails and text messages later proved useful when writing Uncanny Valley.

The earliest version of what would later become Uncanny Valley appeared in literary magazine n+1 in 2016. Wiener did not include the names of the companies at which she worked, in the original piece or the book, opting instead to describe the companies' business models and reputations. She employed the same descriptive strategy when referencing other technology companies, and other organizations with connections to Silicon Valley and tech generally, such as Stanford University. Examples include referring to Facebook as "the social network everyone hated" rather than referring directly to the corporation.

== Reception ==
The New York Times′ Lauren Oyler described Wiener as "far from seeking to disabuse civic-minded techno-skeptics of our views [...] she is here to fill out our worst-case scenarios with shrewd insight and literary detail."

Wired′s Jason Kehe called Wiener "a master of the descriptive arts", a writer of "immaculate sentences", and said the book was "a dishy, readable account" of working in Silicon Valley. The review also critiqued Wiener for "never [resolving] the self-contradictions of her industry, city, or existence" and the book for having "foundational wobble."
