= Korean K9 Rescue =

Korean K9 Rescue (KK9R) is a 501(c)(3) nonprofit no-kill dog rescue dedicated to rescuing and rehabilitating dogs from South Korea and locally in New York City. KK9R is placing stray and abused dogs in loving homes across the United States. Korean K9 Rescue and its South Korean partners have advocated for the dog meat ban bill passed by South Korean National Assembly. In South Korea, 10 million dogs slaughter every year out 30 million in the world.

KK9R also helped Mitchell Rudy (Canada) to break the record for most dogs walked simultaneously by an individual to promote adoption in 2024. KK9R held pet events like therapy for anti-Asian hate crime victims.

== History ==
Korean K9 Rescue was founded in July 2017 by Gina Kim-Sadiku, inspired by her visit to a dog meat farm in Gimpo, South Korea. Since its founding in 2017, KK9R has saved over 3,500 dogs from high-kill shelters, puppy mills, dog meat farms, local shelters, abandoned on the street and other inhumane conditions. KK9R facility exits in Bundang, South Korea and known as dog rescuer.
