= Anna Wiener =

American writer

- Education: Wesleyan University
- Writing career
- Genres: Non-fiction, memoir
- Notable work: Uncanny Valley: A Memoir
- Employer: The New Yorker
- Website: www.annawiener.com

Anna Wiener is an American writer, best known for her 2020 memoir Uncanny Valley. Wiener currently writes for The New Yorker as a tech correspondent.

== Life ==
Wiener grew up in Brooklyn and attended Wesleyan University in Middletown, CT. She worked in the tech sector in San Francisco in an attempt to find a career path with more "momentum" than the book publishing industry, where she was previously employed. Interested in data, particularly the way in which it could be used to tell stories, she worked for the analytics startup Mixpanel and GitHub, and befriended Stripe CEO Patrick Collison. Her book, Uncanny Valley, never mentions the names of the companies she worked at or interacted with, though she often describes their products and corporate cultures in sufficient detail for the reader to deduce what they are. After several years in San Francisco, she left the tech industry for several reasons, including its lack of response to the classified information released by Edward Snowden and a wider disillusionment with the corporate culture and sexism present therein.

Since leaving tech, Wiener has been writing about Silicon Valley for The New Republic, n+1, Atlantic, and others. She is a contributing writer to The New Yorker.

== Bibliography ==
=== Books ===
- Wiener, Anna (2020). Uncanny Valley: A Memoir. New York: MCD/Farrar, Straus and Giroux.

=== Essays and reporting ===
- Wiener, Anna (January 4–11, 2021). "You've got mail : the newsletter service Substack claims to be the future of media. Is it a future we want?". The Critics. A Critic at Large. The New Yorker. 96 (43): 70–76. (Note: Online version is titled "Is Substack the media future we want?".)

=== Critical studies and reviews of Wiener's work ===
Uncanny valley

- Muhammad, Ismail (December 22, 2019). "Inside Tech's Fever Dream". The Atlantic.
- Westenfeld, Adrienne (January 14, 2020). "Anna Wiener Dissects the Brain Rot of Big Tech in Her Searing New Memoir". Esquire.
- Saini, Angela (January 26, 2020). "Uncanny Valley by Anna Wiener review – bullies, greed and sexism in Silicon Valley". The Observer. ISSN 0029-7712.
- Ghaffary, Shirin (January 17, 2020). "Things can get "really bad, really quickly" when a 24-year-old runs a company". Vox.

———————
