= Anne Willan =

English chef and writer

Anne Willan (born 26 January 1938) in Newcastle upon Tyne, England is a cooking instructor, author and food historian with an expertise in French cooking. In 1975 she founded the cooking school École de Cuisine La Varenne, which operated in Paris and Burgundy France, until 2007. Classes continued in Santa Monica, California, through 2017.

Willan received her master's degree in economics from Cambridge University, then studied and taught cooking in London and Paris before moving to the United States where she became an associate editor of Gourmet magazine and food editor of the Washington Star. In 1975, she moved to Paris and founded l'Ecole de Cuisine La Varenne, which later expanded to offer programmes at The Greenbrier and at her home in Burgundy, the Château du Feÿ. The Burgundy campus was in operation until 2007. Most of her books have been widely published in the United States and the UK and have been translated into more than 24 languages.

She has written more than 30 books, including the influential La Varenne Pratique and the 17-volume, photo-illustrated Look and Cook series which was turned into a 26-part PBS program. Willan's The Country Cooking of France received two 2008 James Beard Foundation book awards for best international cookbook and best cookbook photography. Bon Appétit magazine named Willan its cooking teacher of the year in 2000. She was honored with a lifetime achievement award by the International Association of Culinary Professionals (IACP) in 1999 for her contributions to the world of food writing, culinary education and to the IACP itself.

In May 2013, Willan was inducted into the James Beard Foundation Hall of Fame for her “body of work.” In July 2014, Willan was awarded the rank of Chevalier in the French Legion of Honour for her accomplishments in promoting the gastronomy of France.

Willan was married to Mark Cherniavsky, an executive with the World Bank, who died in 2017. They have two children, Emma and Simon, and five grandchildren. As of 2017, Willan lives in London and France.

== Bibliography ==
- Edible Monument: The Art of Food for Festivals, Contributor (2015)
- Secrets from the La Varenne Kitchen (2014)
- One Soufflé at a Time: A Memoir of Food and France (2013)
- The Cookbook Library: Four Centuries of the Cooks, Writers, and Recipes That Made the Modern Cookbook (2012)
- The Country Cooking of France (2007)
- A Cook’s Book of Quick Fixes & Kitchen Tips (2005)
- The Good Cook (2004)
- Good Food No Fuss (2003)
- Cooking with Wine (2001)
- From My Château Kitchen (2000)
- In and Out of the Kitchen in Fifteen Minutes or Less (1995)
- Cook It Right (1998)
- Look and Cook, 17 Volume Series, (1992–1995)
- La France Gastronomique (1991)
- La Varenne Pratique (1989) - also in e-book
- French Regional Cooking (1981)
- Grand Diplome Cooking Course (1979)
- Great Cooks and Their Recipes (1977, republished 1992)

== Board memberships ==
- Member of the Advisory Council of the Julia Child Foundation
- Former president of International Association of Culinary Professionals
- Honorary trustee of The IACP Culinary Trust

== Awards ==
- Appointed "Chevalier" of the French Legion of Honor, 2014
- James Beard Hall of Fame for "Body of Work," 2013
- Won two James Beard Foundation Awards for Country Cooking of France, 2008
- Bon Appetit Cooking Teacher of the Year Award, 2000
- Lifetime Achievement Award of International Association of Culinary Professionals, 1999
- Inducted into Hall of Fame at Australia's World Food Media ceremonies, 1999
- Honoured in 1995 as Grande Dame of Les Dames d'Escoffier International, 1995
- Elected to the Who's Who of Food and Beverage in America in 1986
