= Kawai Strong Washburn =

American writer and novelist

- Born: Hamakua, Hawaiʻi
- Occupation: Novelist
- Writing career
- Period: 2021–present

Kawai Strong Washburn (born in Hamakua, Hawaii) is an American writer and novelist, best known for his debut novel Sharks in the Time of Saviors (2020) which won the Hemingway Foundation/PEN Award and the Minnesota Book Award in 2021.

He works as a software engineer.
