= Pennsylvania History (journal) =

Academic journal

- Discipline: History
- Language: English
- Edited by: Linda A. Ries

Publication details
- History: 1934–present
- Publisher: Penn State University Press (United States)
- Frequency: Quarterly

Standard abbreviations
- ISO 4: Pa. Hist.

Indexing
- ISSN: 0031-4528 (print); 2153-2109 (web)
- LCCN: 37005938
- JSTOR: 00314528
- OCLC no.: 1762058

Links
- Journal homepage; Online access; Online archive

Pennsylvania History: A Journal of Mid-Atlantic Studies is a peer-reviewed academic journal covering the history of the Commonwealth of Pennsylvania. It is published quarterly by Penn State University Press.
