= Rose Prince (writer) =

British food writer (born 1962)

Rose Prince (born 4 December 1962) is a British food writer, author, cook and activist. She was the in-house cook at The Spectator magazine for seven years.

== Career ==
Her writing career started in her mid thirties, after she worked as a chef and the cook in the Notting Hill specialist bookshop, Books for Cooks (where she worked with Clarissa Dixon Wright).

She has a weekly column in The Daily Telegraph. Her columns are widely syndicated. She also has a monthly column in the Catholic weekly, The Tablet (although herself an Anglican she is married to a Catholic). She is a prolific writer and contributes to The Daily Mail, The Spectator, The Times, and Sunday Telegraph. For three years she had a column on The Daily Express. In 2000, she produced a two-part biopic about the food writer Elizabeth David for British broadcaster Channel 4, which also aired in Australia.

She contributes regularly to BBC Radio 4's The Food Programme and was a judge for its Food and Farming Awards in 2009. She was a member of the House of Lords Committee of Inquiry into the meat industry in 2000. She was the winner of a Glenfiddich Food and Drink Award in 2001 and in 2009 was named by Vogue magazine as one of the most inspirational women in Britain.

In 2011, she launched the Pocket Bakery with her children Jack and Lara (then 8 and 11 years old), a community bakery run in her Battersea kitchen making slow fermentation (sourdough) breads for the neighbourhood. In 2012 the bakery transferred its weekly pop-up to the Doodle Bar in Battersea, providing pastries and bread for locals. A non-profit business, the children received pocket money as an income and other young workers were invited to take part with paid training in enterprise and baking skills.

== Personal life ==
She is married to Dominic Prince, a fellow journalist and amateur jockey. They have two children, Jack and Lara.

== Publications ==
- The New English Kitchen. 2005.
- The Savvy Shopper. 2006.
- The New English Table. 2008.
- The Good Food Producers Guide. 2010.
- Kitchenella. Fourth Estate. 2010. ISBN 978-0-00-732887-1.
- The Pocket Bakery. Weidenfeld & Nicolson, 2013.
- How To Make Good Food Go Further: Recipes and Tips from The New English Kitchen, Fourth Estate, 2014.
- Dinner & Party. Seven Dials (Orion), 2017.
