= Quiche Lorraine =

Savoury open pastry tart with a filling of egg, cream and bacon

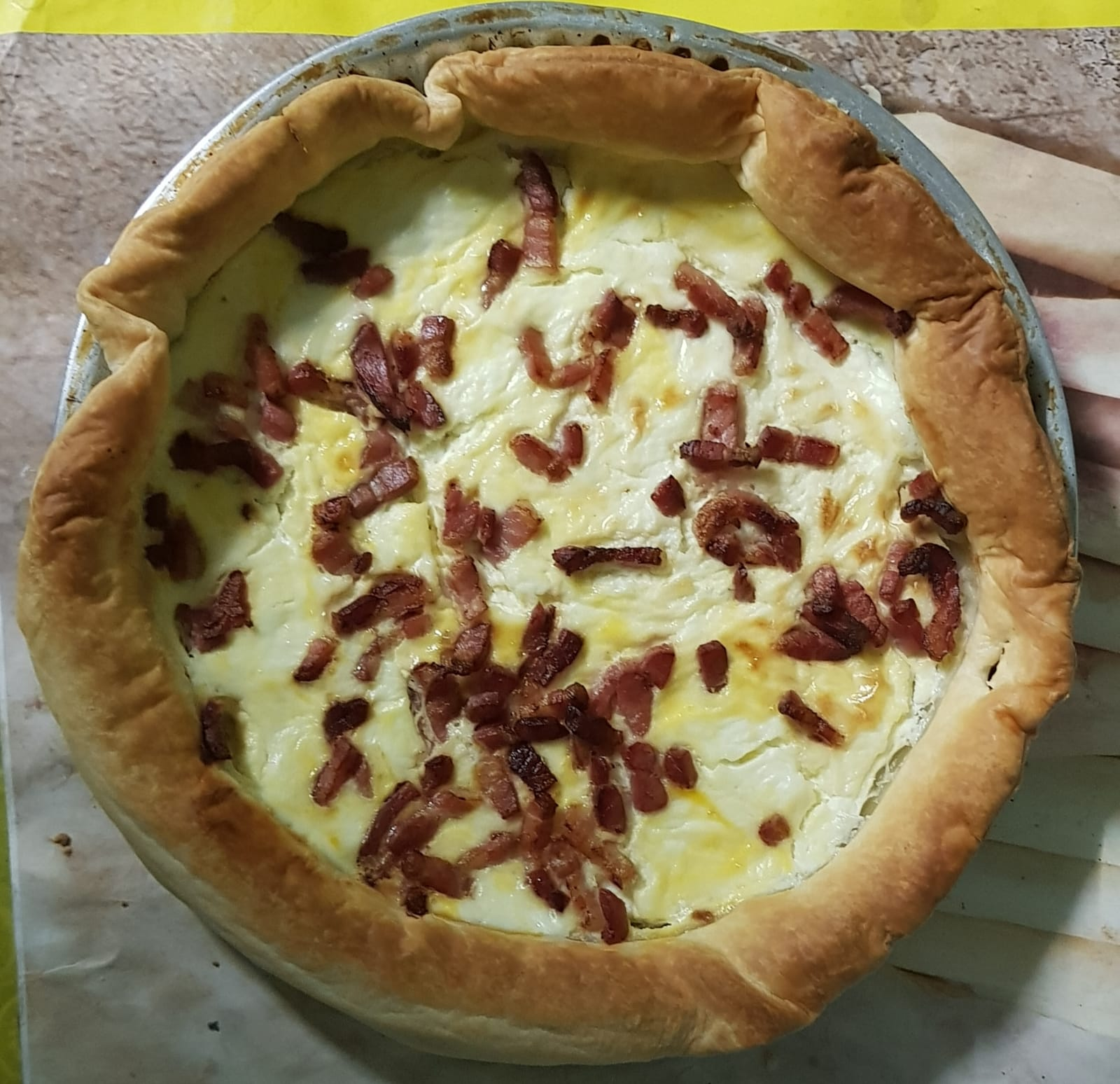
- Quiche Lorraine served in Paris
- Type: Savoury
- Place of origin: France
- Region or state: Lorraine
- Main ingredients: Pastry case filled with egg, cream and bacon

Quiche Lorraine is a savoury French tart with a filling of cream, eggs, and bacon, in an open pastry case. It was little known outside the French region of Lorraine until the mid-20th century. As its popularity spread, nationally and internationally, the addition of cheese became commonplace, although it has been criticised as inauthentic. It may be served hot, warm or cold.

== History ==
According to Larousse Gastronomique, quiches (sometimes spelled kiches) originated in the eastern French region Lorraine. The name may derive from the German Kuchen, a term used for similar dishes. There are many varieties of quiche, and Larousse comments that every region of Alsace and Lorraine has its own and maintains it is the only authentic version of the dish. Originally a quiche Lorraine was baked with a bread-dough case similar to that now used for pissaladières and pizzas, but in modern versions, shortcrust or puff pastry is generally used. The dish dates to the 16th century, but until well into the 20th century it was little known outside its region of origin, and was as seldom seen in Paris as in foreign countries. In Lorraine it was traditionally served on May Day following a dish of sucking pig in aspic.

== Ingredients ==
The classic ingredients for the filling are eggs, thick cream, and ham or bacon (in strips or lardons), made into a savoury custard. Elizabeth David in her French Provincial Cooking (1960) and Simone Beck, Louisette Bertholle and Julia Child in their Mastering the Art of French Cooking (1961) excluded cheese from their recipes for quiche Lorraine, and David in particular was scornful of cooks and manufacturers who added it. She considered they did so for reasons of cost and convenience rather than taste: a classic quiche Lorraine, with only a cream, egg and bacon filling, is "quite tricky to get right".

1901 recipe for quiche Lorraine, in Le Figaro (Note: Opening quotation: "The King can wait; the quiche can't" − Lorraine proverb. Recipe: Make a dough with flour, water, salt and butter; roll it two or three times; spread it on a pie dish, leaving it the thickness of a 1 franc coin [approx. 1.4mm]. In a bowl, beat four whole eggs and a teacup of fresh cream, a pinch of fine salt, pour over the pastry and cook in a very hot oven.)

David placed the responsibility for the inauthentic addition of cheese with Parisian chefs. In 1870 Jules Gouffé introduced a version to which he added Parmesan, and in 1903 Auguste Escoffier recommended lining the pastry case with bacon and strips of Gruyère before adding the cream and egg mixture. Attempts were made to restore the simplicity of the original dish: in 1901 Le Figaro printed a recipe that excluded not only cheese but also bacon, and in 1904 André Theuriet and a fellow native of Lorraine, Edmond Richardin, published another recipe that included neither bacon nor cheese, but in 1932 Marcel Boulestin, a highly influential restaurateur and writer, specified the addition of grated Gruyère, and by the 1950s the use of cheese had become commonplace as the popularity of quiche Lorraine grew. David cited a London cookery school where the students were taught to use evaporated milk and processed Cheddar for their fillings. La Mère Brazier's standard recipe for the dish excluded cheese, but she thought variations permissible, "replac[ing] the lardons and the ham with a layer of sliced Roquefort ... or with thin slices of goose or duck liver and fresh truffle".

Among some recent versions of the dish, Anne-Sophie Pic's adds Comté, and Delia Smith's adds both Cheddar and Parmesan. No cheese is used in the versions by Lindsey Bareham, Felicity Cloake, Alain Ducasse, Simon Hopkinson, Thomas Keller and Dan Lepard. Anne Willan distinguishes between quiche Lorraine – made without cheese – and quiche Lorraine au fromage – with sliced Gruyère placed on top of the bacon before the egg mixture is added. She also gives a recipe for quiche Lorraine aux oignons – with browned onions added to the bacon.

Ready-made quiches Lorraines sold in supermarkets in France, Britain and the US typically contain cheese – usually Emmental or similar, although British versions often contain Cheddar. (Note: Quiches Lorraines sold by Picard Surgelés in 2022 contained 11.6% "Emmental français", and those from Monoprix 3.1% Emmental français. In Britain, the stronger Cheddar was prevalent, constituting 15% of the quiche from Waitrose and 9% of that from Marks and Spencer (with a further 8% of Emmental). Ready-made American quiches Lorraines contained unrevealed quantities of "Grand Cru Cheese" (cultured pasteurised milk, salt, enzymes, potato starch and powdered cellulose) from Whole Foods Market, and unspecified Swiss cheese in Nancy's version.)

The dish may be served hot, warm or cold.

== Notes, references and sources ==
=== Sources ===
- Beck, Simone; Louisette Bertholle; Julia Child (2012) [1961]. Mastering the Art of French Cooking, Volume One. London: Particular. ISBN 978-0-241-95339-6.
- Brazier, Eugénie; Roger Moreau; Paul Bocuse (2015) [2004]. La Mère Brazier: The Mother of Modern French Cooking. London: Modern Books. ISBN 978-1-906761-84-4.
- David, Elizabeth (2001). Is There a Nutmeg in the House?. London: Viking. ISBN 978-0-7540-2446-0.
- David, Elizabeth (2008) [1960]. French Provincial Cooking. London: Folio Society. OCLC 809349711.
- Escoffier, Auguste (1903). Le guide culinaire: aide-mémoire de cuisine pratiqué (in French). Paris: Art culinaire. OCLC 1202722258.
- Montagné, Prosper (1976). Larousse gastronomique. London: Hamlyn. OCLC 1285641881.
- Smith, Delia (2008). How to Cheat at Cooking. London: Ebury. ISBN 978-0-09-192229-0.
- Willan, Anne (1981). French Regional Cooking. London: Hutchinson. ISBN 0-09-146210-X.
