= Quiche Lorraine (disambiguation) =

Quiche Lorraine is a pastry.

It may also refer to:

- Quiche Lorraine (song)
- Quiche Lorraine (character)
