= French Provincial Cooking =

Cookery book

- Author: Elizabeth David
- Genre: Cookery
- Publisher: Michael Joseph
- Publication date: 1960
- Media type: Hardback book

French Provincial Cooking is a 1960 cookery book by Elizabeth David. It was first published in London by Michael Joseph.

== Context ==
Elizabeth David (1913–1992) was a British cookery writer who spent some years living in France and other Mediterranean countries. In the mid-20th century she strongly influenced the revitalisation of home cookery in her native country and beyond with articles and books about European cuisines and traditional British dishes.

== Publication history ==
French Provincial Cooking was published by Michael Joseph in London in 1960. The first print run sold out and the book had to be reprinted within weeks of publication. The first paperback issue of the first edition was by Penguin Books in 1964. The hardback sold for one pound fifteen shillings (£1.75 in decimal terms); the paperback cost seven shillings and sixpence (35½p).

New editions were published in 1965, 1967 and 1970. Between the editions there were reprints with minor revisions. In addition to her original five-page introduction, David wrote prefatory notes to 1977 and 1983 reissues.

== Content ==
The book deals with the following topics:

- French cooking in England
- The cookery of the French provinces
- Provence
- Paris, Normandy and the Île de France
- Alsace and Lorraine
- Brittany and the Loire
- The Savoie
- Burgundy, the Lyonnais, and the Bresse
- South-western France
  - The Bearnais and the Basque country
  - The Bordelais
  - The Perigord
  - The Languedoc
- Kitchen equipment
- Cooking terms and processes
  - Wine for the kitchen
- Herbs, spices, condiments, etc., used in French cookery
- Weights and measures
- Temperatures and timing
- Sauces
- Hors-d'œuvre and salads
- Soups
- Eggs, cheese dishes and hot hors-d'œuvre
- Pates and terrines, sausages, ham dishes and other pork products
- Vegetables.
- Fish
- Shell-fish and crustacea
- Meat
  - Beef
  - Lamb and mutton
  - Fresh pork
  - Veal
- Composite meat dishes, cassoulets, etc.
- Poultry and game
- The left-overs
- Sweet dishes
- Cookery books

== History ==
After the success of her first book, the 1950 A Book of Mediterranean Food, based on her stays in Antibes and elsewhere during the Second World War, David wrote four others on Mediterranean cuisines, namely the 1951 French Country Cooking, the 1954 Italian Food, the 1955 Summer Cooking, and finally in 1960 French Provincial Cooking. David states that French Provincial Cooking incorporated numerous articles she had written for Vogue and The Sunday Times in the 1950s. It has been described as "her most influential book", offering in Joe Moran's words a "stylish but straightforward cuisine [which] fitted in with a new type of casual urban entertaining", suitable for having "a few friends round for a meal" as opposed to an old-fashioned dinner party.

In 1953, the American Cordon Bleu cook Julia Child visited Marseille and was like David impressed by the freshness of the produce from vegetables to fish, so unlike America's chilled and wrapped supermarket goods. This led to her 1961 book Mastering the Art of French Cooking. The culinary historian Rosemary Lancaster writes that while Child's book describes how to prepare the food plainly and directly, without David's discourses on the ambience of the cuisine, both women "seduced their readers", changing cooking habits in their home countries.

In 1972, J. A. E. Loubère recommended the book to Americans for its combination of the pleasures of "armchair traveling" and "armchair cookery", noting that the provinces covered extend beyond the familiar ones, and that where some cuts of meat would not be readily available in the US, the recipes can easily be adjusted. The book had success in Australia, too. The Australian novelist Marion Halligan wrote that David "gave meaning to the food" at newly-fashionable post-war dinner parties that offered French food.

== Sources ==
- Chaney, Lisa (1998). Elizabeth David. London: Macmillan. ISBN 978-0-333-65930-4.
- David, Elizabeth (1960). French Provincial Cooking. London: Michael Joseph. OCLC 1087212421.
- David, Elizabeth (2008) [1960]. French Provincial Cooking (4th ed.). London: Folio Society. OCLC 809349711.
