= English Bread and Yeast Cookery =

1977 English cookery book

- First edition cover
- Author: Elizabeth David
- Subject: English baking
- Genre: Cookery
- Publisher: Penguin
- Publication date: 1977
- ISBN: 0713910267
- OCLC: 1391522220

English Bread and Yeast Cookery is an English cookery book by Elizabeth David, first published in 1977. The work consists of a history of bread-making in England, improvements to the process developed in Europe, an examination of the ingredients used and recipes of different types of bread.

== Background and writing history ==
Edwardian cooking range: one of the illustrations in English Bread and Yeast Cookery

The food writer Elizabeth David had published six books and several booklets before 1977. Her first works had been about the foods of the Mediterranean, France and Italy, but she had also begun to write about English cuisine; her first book on the subject was the 1970 work Spices, Salt and Aromatics in the English Kitchen.

English Bread and Yeast Cookery was David's second book on English food, which she spent five years researching and writing. Some of the research was undertaken with Jill Norman, her friend and publisher. She was angered by the standard of bread in Britain and wrote:

What is utterly dismaying is the mess our milling and baking concerns succeed in making with the dearly bought grain that goes into their grist. Quite simply it is wasted on a nation that cares so little about the quality of its bread that it has allowed itself to be mesmerized into buying the equivalent of eight and a quarter million large white factory-made loaves every day of the year.

In the book, David reproduced a newspaper cartoon published during a bakers' strike in 1974, showing one housewife telling another, "I've been giving them sliced bathroom sponge, and they haven't noticed yet."

== Book ==
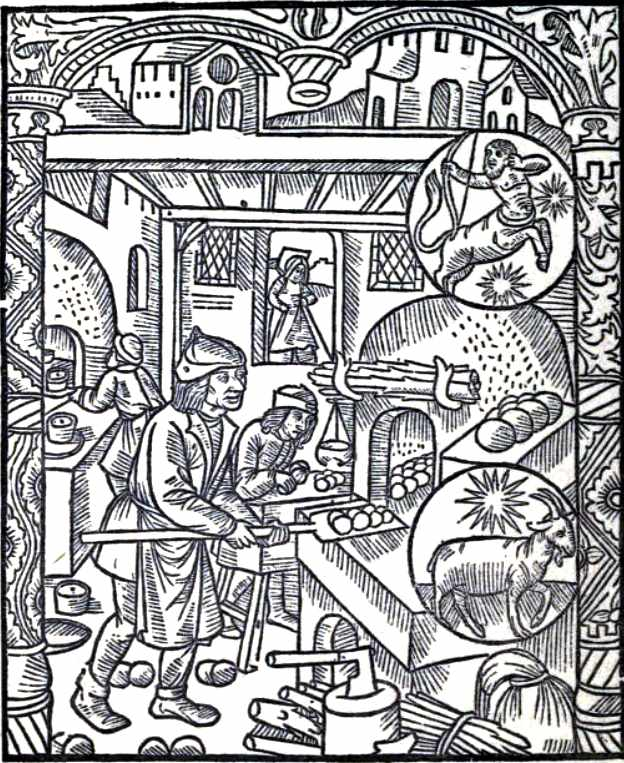
15th-century woodcut showing a baker and a pastrycook at work, reproduced in the book

The work covered the history of bread-making in England and an examination of each ingredient used. David follows the pattern of Spices, Salt and Aromatics in the English Kitchen, devoting the first part of the book to history and the second to recipes. Reviewing the new book, the food writer Jane Grigson wrote "Mrs. David gives the history of wheat and milling … She goes into weights and cost from the establishment in 1266 of the Assize of Bread up to present-day regulations, with a separate chapter on costing your own bread vis-à-vis bought loaves."

In the second part, David devotes chapters to recipes for various forms of baking. Bread comes first, followed by recipes for, among many other things, buns, yeast cakes, soda-bread, brioches, croissants, pain au chocolat and pizza. As in her earlier books, the recipes are interspersed with excerpts from earlier authors, including Fernand Braudel, Auguste Escoffier, and the painter John Constable.

=== Contents ===
The following list refers to the 1977 edition.

- Acknowledgements
- Introduction
- Table of Contents
- Part I: History and Background
1. Our Bread Grain: Wheat, Rye, Barley, Oats and Pease
2. Milling
3. Bread Flours and Meals
4. Yeast
5. Salt
6. Liquids and Fats used in Breadmaking
7. Eggs, Dried Fruit, Sugar, Spices and Flavourings used in Yeast Cakes and Breads
8. Malt Extracts
9. Bread Ovens
10. The Bread Factories
11. Shapes and Names of English Loaves
12. Moulds and Tins for Bread and Yeast Cakes
13. Storage of Meal and Flour
14. Storage of Bread
15. Weights of Loaves and the Assize of Bread
16. Weights, Measures and Temperatures
17. Weighing and Measuring Equipment
18. The Cost of Baking your Own Bread
- Part II: Recipes
1. Bread
2. Baps and Rolls
3. Manchets and Mayn and Payndemayn
4. Crumpets and Muffins
5. Notes on French Bread
6. The Pizza and the Pissaladière
7. Quiches and Yeast Dough
8. Sausage in Brioche Crust
9. Yeast Leavened Pancakes and Oatcakes
10. Dumplings and Doughnuts
11. Regional and Festival Yeast Cakes and Fruit Breads
12. Yeast Buns and Small Tea Cakes
13. French Yeast Cakes
14. Soda Breads
15. Bakestone Cakes and Bread
16. Toast
- Bibliography and Further Reading List
- Index

== Release and reception ==
Victorian advertisement reproduced in the book

In 1977 David was badly injured in a car accident—sustaining a fractured left elbow and right wrist, a damaged knee cap and a broken jaw—from which she took a long time to recover. English Bread and Yeast Cookery was published while she was in hospital. Its scholarship won high praise, and Jane Grigson, writing in The Times Literary Supplement, suggested that a copy of the book should be given to every marrying couple.

In The Observer, Hilary Spurling called the book "a scathing indictment of the British bread industry" and also "a history of virtually every development since Stone Age crops and querns". Spurling rejoiced in the range of David's recipes, and thought the book was done with "orderliness, authority, phenomenal scope and fastidious attention to detail". Roger Baker, reviewing in The Times wrote "This is probably Mrs. David's most academic work yet. However, not one ounce of the familiar charm, good sense, asperity (reserved for modern commercial white bread), clarity or warmth is missing."

== Publishing history ==
The book was published by Allen Lane in hardback and Penguin Books in paperback, with reprints in 1978 and 1979. The first American edition was published by Viking Press in 1980, and a rewritten American edition was published by Penguin in 1982. In 1995, Biscuit Books of Newton, Mass. published a new American edition. A new edition was published in London by Grub Street books in 2010.

== Notes and references ==
=== Sources ===
- Baker, Roger (25 November 1977). "Food and Drink". The Times. p. xiv.
- Cooper, Artemis (1999). Writing at the Kitchen Table—The Authorized Biography of Elizabeth David. London: Michael Joseph. ISBN 978-0-7181-4224-7.
- Cooper, Artemis (2011). "David, Elizabeth (1913–1992)". Oxford Dictionary of National Biography (online ed.). Oxford University Press. doi:10.1093/ref:odnb/50960. (Subscription, Wikipedia Library access or UK public library membership required.)
- David, Elizabeth (1977). English Bread and Yeast Cookery. Harmondsworth: Penguin. ISBN 978-0-14-046299-9.
- David, Elizabeth (2001) [2000]. Norman, Jill (ed.). Is There a Nutmeg in the House?. London: Penguin. ISBN 978-0-14-029290-9.
- "Showing all Editions for 'English Bread and Yeast Cookery'". WorldCat.
- Grigson, Jane (2 December 1977). "The Life-Giving Loaf". The Times Literary Supplement. p. 404.
- Spurling, Hilary (18 December 1977). "Unnatural practices". The Observer. p. 25.
- Williams, Maggie (June 1994). "Elizabeth David". The Book and Magazine Collector (123): 56–63.
