= Elizabeth David =

British cookery writer (1913–1992)

Elizabeth David CBE
- David, c. 1960
- Born: Elizabeth Gwynne; 26 December 1913; Folkington, East Sussex, England
- Died: 22 May 1992 (aged 78); Chelsea, London, England
- Education: Sorbonne
- Occupation: Cookery writer
- Father: Rupert Gwynne

Elizabeth David CBE (née Gwynne, 26 December 1913 – 22 May 1992) was a British cookery writer. In the mid-20th century she strongly influenced the revitalisation of home cookery in her native country and beyond with articles and books about European cuisines and traditional British dishes.

Born to an upper-class family, David rebelled against social norms of the day. In the 1930s she studied art in Paris, became an actress, and ran off with a married man with whom she sailed in a small boat to Italy, where their boat was confiscated. They reached Greece, where they were nearly trapped by the German invasion in 1941, but escaped to Egypt, where they parted. She then worked for the British government, running a library in Cairo. While there she married, but she and her husband separated soon after and subsequently divorced.

In 1946 David returned to England, where food rationing imposed during the Second World War remained in force. Dismayed by the contrast between the bad food served in Britain and the simple, excellent food to which she had become accustomed in France, Greece and Egypt, she began to write magazine articles about Mediterranean cooking. They attracted favourable attention, and in 1950, at the age of 36, she published A Book of Mediterranean Food. Her recipes called for ingredients such as aubergines, basil, figs, garlic, olive oil and saffron, which at the time were scarcely available in Britain. Books on French, Italian and, later, English cuisine followed. By the 1960s David was a major influence on British cooking. She was deeply hostile to anything second-rate, to over-elaborate cooking, and bogus substitutes for classic dishes and ingredients. In 1965 she opened a shop selling kitchen equipment, which continued to trade under her name after she left it in 1973.

David's reputation rests on her articles and her books, which have been continually reprinted. Between 1950 and 1984 she published eight books; after her death her literary executor completed a further four that she had planned and worked on. David's influence on British cooking extended to professional as well as domestic cooks, and chefs and restaurateurs of later generations such as Terence Conran, Simon Hopkinson, Prue Leith, Jamie Oliver, Tom Parker Bowles and Rick Stein have acknowledged her importance to them. In the US, cooks and writers including Julia Child, Richard Olney and Alice Waters have written of her influence.

== Life and career ==
=== Early years ===
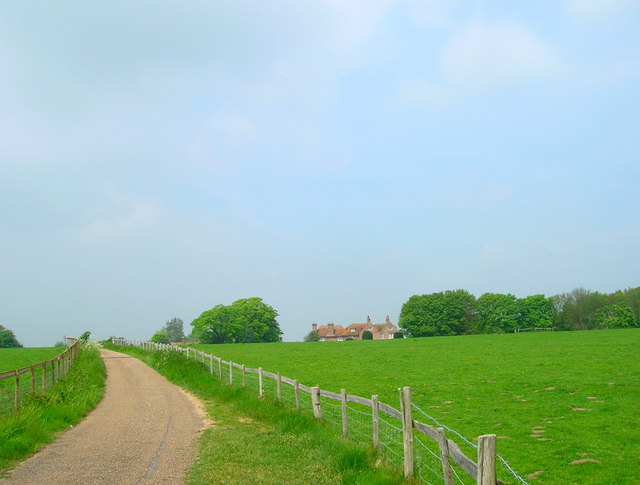
Grounds of Wootton Manor, David's family home

David was born Elizabeth Gwynne, the second of four children, all daughters, of Rupert Sackville Gwynne and his wife, the Hon Stella Gwynne, daughter of the 1st Viscount Ridley. Both parents' families had considerable fortunes, the Gwynnes from engineering and land speculation and the Ridleys from coal mining. Through the two families, David was of English, Scottish and Welsh or Irish descent and, through an ancestor on her father's side, also Dutch and Sumatran. (Note: According to the biographer Pamela Cullen, Elizabeth David's uncle Roland Gwynne submitted "a false entry to Burke's Peerage" claiming the family was Welsh rather than Irish.) She and her sisters grew up at Wootton Manor in Sussex, a seventeenth-century manor house with extensive, early twentieth-century additions by Detmar Blow. Her father, despite having a weak heart, insisted on pursuing a demanding political career, becoming Conservative MP for Eastbourne, (Note: In consequence of her father's membership of the House of Commons, Elizabeth was baptised in the Crypt Chapel of the Palace of Westminster on 22 January 1914. Her godparents were her maternal grandmother; Winifred Blow, wife of Detmar Blow; Dudley Gordon; and Algernon Littleton.) and a junior minister in Bonar Law's government. Overwork, combined with his vigorous recreational pastimes, chiefly racing, riding, and womanising, brought about his death in 1924, aged 51. (Note: Cooper, p. 21, states that Rupert Gwynne was 52 at the time of his death, but Who's Who and Alumni Cantabrigienses confirm Gwynne's date of birth as 2 August 1873, making him 51 when he died.)

The widowed Stella Gwynne was a dutiful mother, but her relations with her daughters were distant rather than affectionate. Elizabeth and her sisters, Priscilla, Diana and Felicité were sent away to boarding schools. Having been a pupil at Godstowe preparatory school in High Wycombe, Elizabeth was sent to St Clare's Private School for Ladies, Tunbridge Wells, which she left at the age of sixteen. The girls grew up knowing nothing of cooking, which in upper-class households of the time was the exclusive province of the family's cook and her kitchen staff.

As a teenager David enjoyed painting, and her mother thought her talent worth developing. In 1930 she was sent to Paris, where she studied painting privately and enrolled at the Sorbonne for a course in French civilisation which covered history, literature and architecture. She found her Sorbonne studies arduous and in many ways uninspiring, but they left her with a love of French literature and a fluency in the language that remained with her throughout her life. She lodged with a Parisian family, whose fanatical devotion to the pleasures of the table she portrayed to comic effect in her French Provincial Cooking (1960). Nevertheless, she acknowledged in retrospect that the experience had been the most valuable part of her time in Paris: "I realized in what way the family had fulfilled their task of instilling French culture into at least one of their British charges. Forgotten were the Sorbonne professors. ... What had stuck was the taste for a kind of food quite ideally unlike anything I had known before." Stella Gwynne was not eager for her daughter's early return to England after qualifying for her Sorbonne diploma, and sent her from Paris to Munich in 1931 to study German.

=== Actress ===
After returning to England in 1932 David unenthusiastically went through the social rituals for upper-class young women of presentation at court as a débutante and the associated balls. The respectable young Englishmen she met at the latter did not appeal to her. David's biographer Lisa Chaney comments that with her "delicately smouldering looks and her shyness shielded by a steely coolness and barbed tongue" she would have been a daunting prospect for the young upper-class men she encountered. David decided that she was not good enough as a painter and, to her mother's displeasure, became an actress. She joined J. B. Fagan's company at the Oxford Playhouse in 1933. Her fellow performers included Joan Hickson, who decades later recalled having to show her new colleague how to make a cup of tea, so unaware of the kitchen was David in those days.

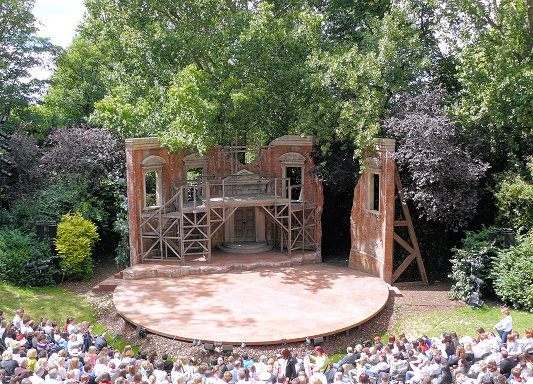
Regent's Park Open Air Theatre (2008 photograph)

From Oxford, David moved to the Open Air Theatre in Regent's Park, London, the following year. She rented rooms in a large house near the park, spent a generous 21st birthday present on equipping the kitchen, and learned to cook. A gift from her mother of The Gentle Art of Cookery by Hilda Leyel was her first cookery book. She later wrote, "I wonder if I would have ever learned to cook at all if I had been given a routine Mrs Beeton to learn from, instead of the romantic Mrs Leyel with her rather wild, imagination-catching recipes."

At Regent's Park David made little professional progress. The company was distinguished, headed by Nigel Playfair and Jack Hawkins, and, in the leading female roles, Anna Neagle and Margaretta Scott. David was restricted to bit parts. Among her colleagues in the company was an actor nine years her senior, Charles Gibson Cowan. (Note: In his memoirs Cowan states that he was born at Pewley Hill, Guildford, in 1903 to a former East End family.) His disregard for social conventions appealed strongly to her, and she also found him sexually irresistible. His being married did not daunt either of them, and they began an affair that outlasted her stage career. Chaney comments, "Cowan was the ultimate outsider. He was working class, left wing, Jewish, an actor, a pickpocket, a vagabond, who lived in caves in Hastings for a time. Her mother called him a 'pacifist worm'. He was a sexual presence, and slept with anything that moved." David's mother strongly disapproved, and tried to put a stop to the affair. She arranged for her daughter to spend several weeks holidaying with family and friends in Malta in the first half of 1936 and in Egypt later in the same year, but in her 1999 biography Artemis Cooper comments that David's lengthy absence failed to detach her from her involvement with Cowan. During her stay in Malta, David was able to spend time learning from her hostess's cook, Angela, who was happy to pass on her expertise. Although she could produce elaborate grand dinners when required, the most important lesson she taught David was to work day in, day out, with all available ingredients, showing her how to make an old bird or a stringy piece of meat into a good dish.

=== France, Greece, Egypt and India ===
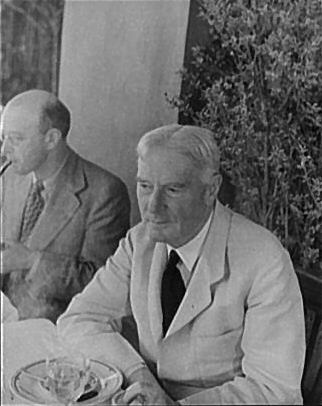
Norman Douglas, David's mentor from 1938

After her return to London in early 1937, David recognised that she was not going to be a success on the stage, and abandoned thoughts of a theatrical career. Later in the year she took a post as a junior assistant at the fashion house of Worth, where elegant young women from upper-class backgrounds were sought after as recruits. She found the subservience of retail work irksome, and resigned in early 1938. Over the next few months she spent time holidaying in the south of France and on Corsica, where she was greatly taken with the outgoing nature of the people she stayed with and the simple excellence of their food. After returning to London, and disenchanted with life there, she joined Cowan in buying a small boat—a yawl with an engine—with the intention of sailing it to Greece. They crossed the Channel in July 1939 and navigated the boat through the canal system of France to the Mediterranean coast.

The outbreak of the Second World War in September 1939 halted their progress. After stopping briefly at Marseille they sailed on to Antibes, where they remained for more than six months, unable to gain permission to leave. There David met and became greatly influenced by the ageing writer Norman Douglas, about whom she later wrote extensively. (Note: Two of her essays about him, "Have It Your Way" and "If You Care to Eat Shark", are included in An Omelette and a Glass of Wine (1984).) He inspired her love of the Mediterranean, encouraged her interest in good food, and taught her to "search out the best, insist on it, and reject all that was bogus and second-rate". Cooper describes him as David's most important mentor.

David and Cowan finally left Antibes in May 1940, sailing to Corsica and then towards Sicily. They had reached the Strait of Messina when Italy entered the war on 10 June. They were suspected of spying and were interned. After 19 days in custody in various parts of Italy, they were allowed to cross the border into Yugoslavia, which at that point remained neutral and non-combatant. They had lost almost everything they owned—the boat, money, manuscripts, notebooks, and David's cherished collection of recipes. With the help of the British Consul in Zagreb, they crossed into Greece, and arrived in Athens in July 1940. By this time, David was no longer in love with her partner but remained with him from necessity. Cowan found a job teaching English on the island of Syros, where David learnt to cook with the fresh ingredients available locally. When the Germans invaded Greece in April 1941, the couple managed to leave on a civilian convoy to Egypt.

Able to speak excellent French and good German, David secured a job in the naval cipher office in Alexandria. She was quickly rescued from temporary refugee accommodation, having met an old English friend who had an "absurdly grandiose" flat in the city and invited her to keep house for him. She and Cowan amicably went their separate ways, and she moved into the grand flat. She engaged a cook, Kyriacou, a Greek refugee, whose eccentricities (sketched in a chapter of Is There a Nutmeg in the House?) did not prevent him from producing magnificent food: "The flavour of that octopus stew, the rich wine dark sauce and the aroma of mountain herbs was something not easily forgotten." In 1942 she caught an infection that affected her feet. She spent some weeks in hospital and felt obliged to give up her job in the cipher office. She then moved to Cairo, where she was asked to set up and run a reference library for the British Ministry of Information. The library was open to everyone and was much in demand by journalists and other writers. Her circle of friends in this period included Alan Moorehead, Freya Stark, Bernard Spencer, Patrick Kinross, Olivia Manning and Lawrence Durrell. At her tiny flat in the city, she employed Suleiman, a Sudanese suffragi (a cook-housekeeper). She recalled:

Suleiman performed minor miracles with two Primus stoves and an oven which was little more than a tin box perched on top of them. His soufflés were never less than successful. ... For three or four years I lived mainly on rather rough but highly flavoured colourful shining vegetable dishes, lentil or fresh tomato soups, delicious spiced pilaffs, lamb kebabs grilled over charcoal, salads with cool mint-flavoured yoghurt dressings, the Egyptian fellahin dish of black beans with olive oil and lemon and hard-boiled eggs—these things were not only attractive but also cheap.

Cooper comments on this period of David's life, "Pictures of her at the time show a quintessential librarian, dressed in a dark cardigan over a white shirt with a prim little collar buttoned up to the neck: but at night, dressed in exotic spangled caftans, she was a different creature: drinking at Hedjaki's bar, eating at the P'tit Coin de France, dancing on the roof of the Continental and then going on to Madame Badia's nightclub or the glamorous Auberge des Pyramides." In her years in Cairo, David had a number of affairs. She enjoyed them for what they were, but only once fell in love. That was with a young officer, Peter Laing, but the relationship came to an end when he was seriously wounded and returned to his native Canada. Several other of her young men fell in love with her; one of them was Lieutenant-Colonel Anthony David (1911–1967). By now aged thirty, she weighed the advantages and disadvantages of remaining unmarried until such time as the ideal husband might appear, and with considerable misgivings she finally accepted Tony David's proposal of marriage.

The couple were married in Cairo on 30 August 1944. Within a year, Tony David was posted to India. His wife followed him there in January 1946, but she found life as the wife of an officer of the British Raj tedious, the social life dull, and the food generally "frustrating". Later in life she came to appreciate the cuisine more, and wrote about a few Indian dishes and recipes in her articles and books. In June 1946, she suffered severe sinusitis and was told by her doctors that the condition would persist if she remained in the summer heat of Delhi. Instead, she was advised to go back to England. She did so; Cooper observes, "She had been away from England for six years, and in that time she, and England, had changed beyond recognition."

=== Post-war England ===
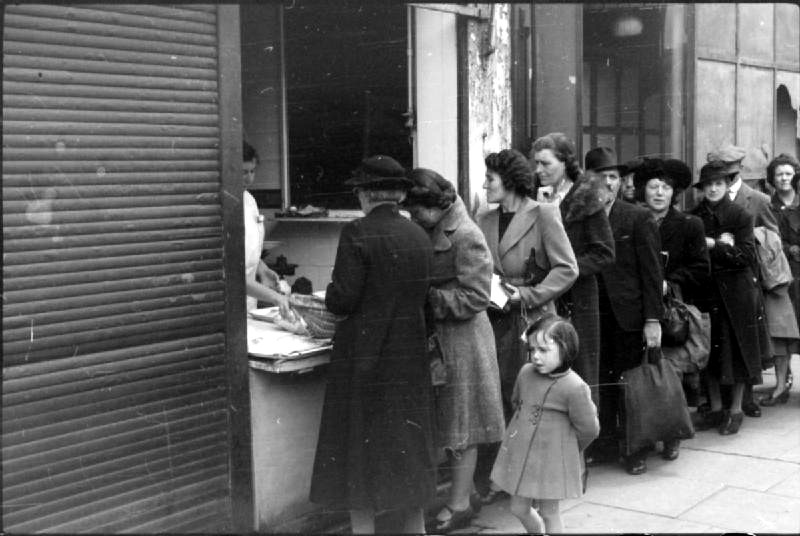
The reality of rationing and austerity: queuing for fish in London, 1945

Returning after her years of Mediterranean warmth and access to a profusion of fresh ingredients, David found her native country in the post-war period grey and daunting, with food rationing still in force. (Note: When David arrived back in Britain, bacon, fat, wheat, sugar, cheese, bread, milk and eggs were all rationed. Most foodstuff did not come off the ration until the early 1950s; meat, the last rationed foodstuff, came off in 1954.) She encountered terrible food: "There was flour and water soup seasoned solely with pepper; bread and gristle rissoles; dehydrated onions and carrots; corned beef toad in the hole. I need not go on." In London, she met George Lassalle, a former lover of hers from Cairo days, and their affair was rekindled. The couple went to Ross-on-Wye in November 1946 for a week's break, but were stranded in the town by the season's inclement weather. Frustrated by the poor food provided by the hotel, she was encouraged by Lassalle to put her thoughts on paper.

Hardly knowing what I was doing ... I sat down and started to work out an agonized craving for the sun and a furious revolt against that terrible cheerless, heartless food by writing down descriptions of Mediterranean and Middle Eastern cooking. Even to write words like apricot, olives and butter, rice and lemons, oil and almonds, produced assuagement. Later I came to realize that in the England of 1947, those were dirty words I was putting down.

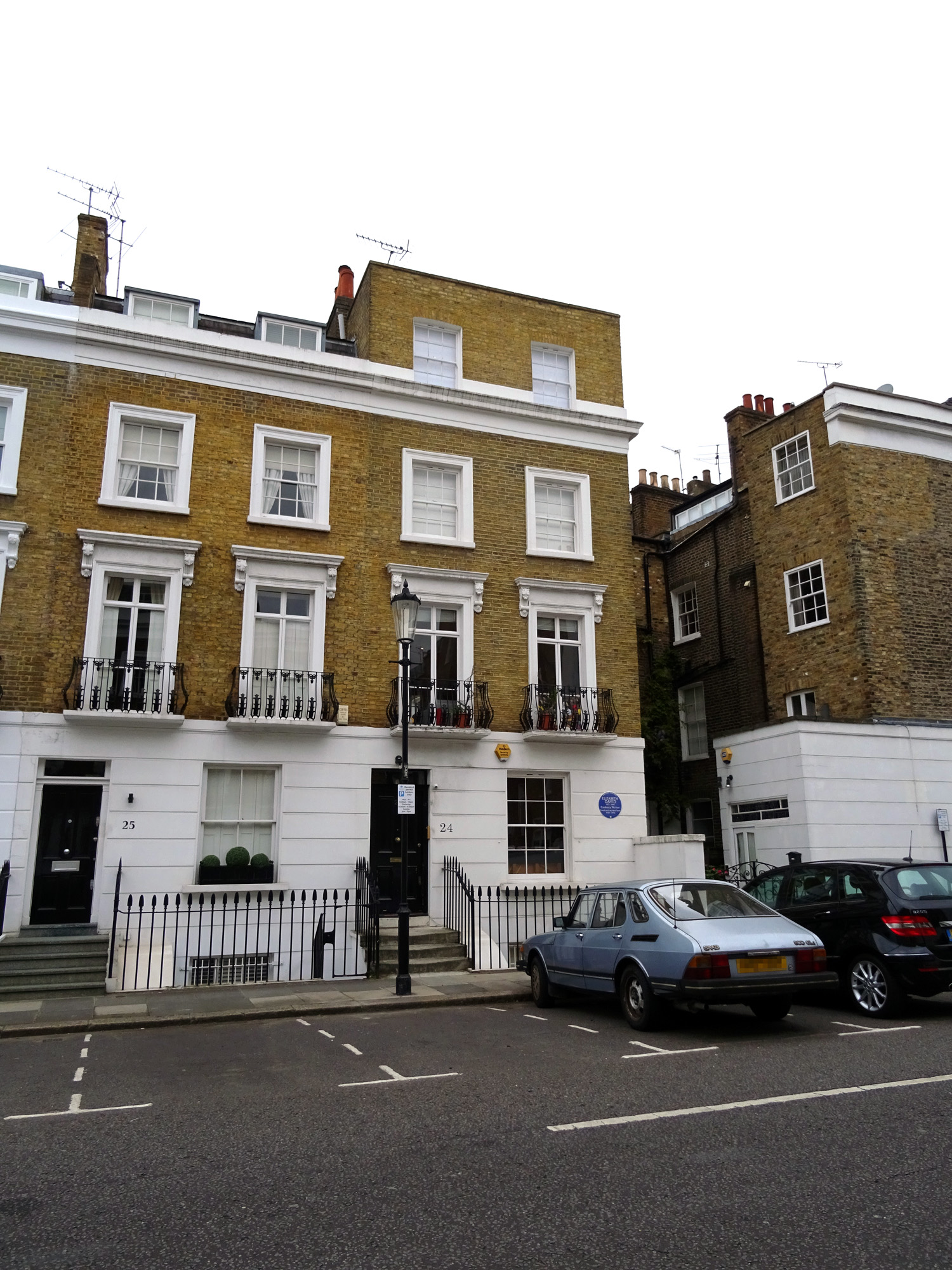
24 Halsey Street, Chelsea, David's home from 1947 until her death. A blue memorial plaque commemorates her.

When her husband returned from India in 1947, David immediately separated from Lassalle and resumed the role of wife. With the aid of Stella Gwynne, David and her husband bought a house in Chelsea, which remained her home for the rest of her life. Tony David proved ineffectual in civilian life, unable to find a suitable job; he ran up debts, partly from a failed business venture. What remained of the spark in the relationship soon died, and they were living separately by 1948.

Veronica Nicholson, a friend with connections in the publishing trade, persuaded David to continue writing, with the aim that she write a book. She showed some of David's work to Anne Scott-James, the editor of the British edition of Harper's Bazaar, who thought the writing showed a widely travelled person with an independent mind. She offered David a contract, and David's work began appearing in the publication from March 1949. (Note: The first article was "Rice Again", about how the increased availability of rice meant dishes such as risottos, curries and pilafs could be enjoyed again.)

David told Scott-James that she planned to publish the articles as a book, and was allowed to retain the copyright by the magazine. Even before all the articles had been published, she had assembled them into a typescript volume called A Book of Mediterranean Food; many of the recipes ignored the restrictions of rationing in favour of authenticity, and in several cases the ingredients were not available in British shops. David submitted her manuscript to a series of publishers, all of whom turned it down. One of them explained that a collection of unconnected recipes needed linking text. David took this advice, but conscious of her inexperience as a writer she kept her own prose short and quoted extensively from established authors whose views on the Mediterranean might carry more weight. She submitted the revised typescript to John Lehmann, a publisher more associated with poetry than cookery; he accepted it and agreed to an advance payment of £100. A Book of Mediterranean Food was published in June 1950.

A Book of Mediterranean Food, with John Minton's design on the cover, which David thought "stunning"

A Book of Mediterranean Food was illustrated by John Minton; writers including Cyril Ray and John Arlott commented that the drawings added to the attractions of the book. Martin Salisbury, the professor of illustration at the Cambridge School of Art, writes that Minton's "brilliant, neo-romantic designs perfectly complement the writing". David placed great importance on the illustration of books, (Note: David's views on inappropriate illustrations were expressed in her essay "South Wind in the Kitchen".) and described Minton's jacket design as "stunning". She was especially taken with "his beautiful Mediterranean bay, his tables spread with white cloths and bright fruit" and the way that "pitchers and jugs and bottles of wine could be seen far down the street"; she considered the cover design aided the success of the book, but was less convinced by his black and white drawings.

The book was well received by reviewers. Elizabeth Nicholas, writing for The Sunday Times, thought David a "gastronome of rare integrity" who "refuses ... to make any ignoble compromises with expediency". Although John Chandos, writing in The Observer, pointed out that "Let no one eating in London—with whatever abandon—imagine that he is eating Mediterranean food in the absence of Mediterranean earth and air", he finished his review by saying that the book "deserves to become the familiar companion of all who seek uninhibited excitement in the kitchen".

The success of the book led to offers of work from The Sunday Times—for which she was paid an advance of 60 guineas—Go, a travel magazine owned by the newspaper, and Wine and Food, the journal of the Wine and Food Society. In August 1950 David and her husband went on their final holiday together with the money from the new contracts, although they had trouble with the car they were using for touring and the holiday was unsuccessful. On her return she invited Felicité, her youngest sister, to move into the top flat in her house. David was a reluctant and unskilful typist—she preferred the feel of writing with a pen—and in exchange for a low rent, Felicité expertly typed her articles and books, and later acted as her principal researcher.

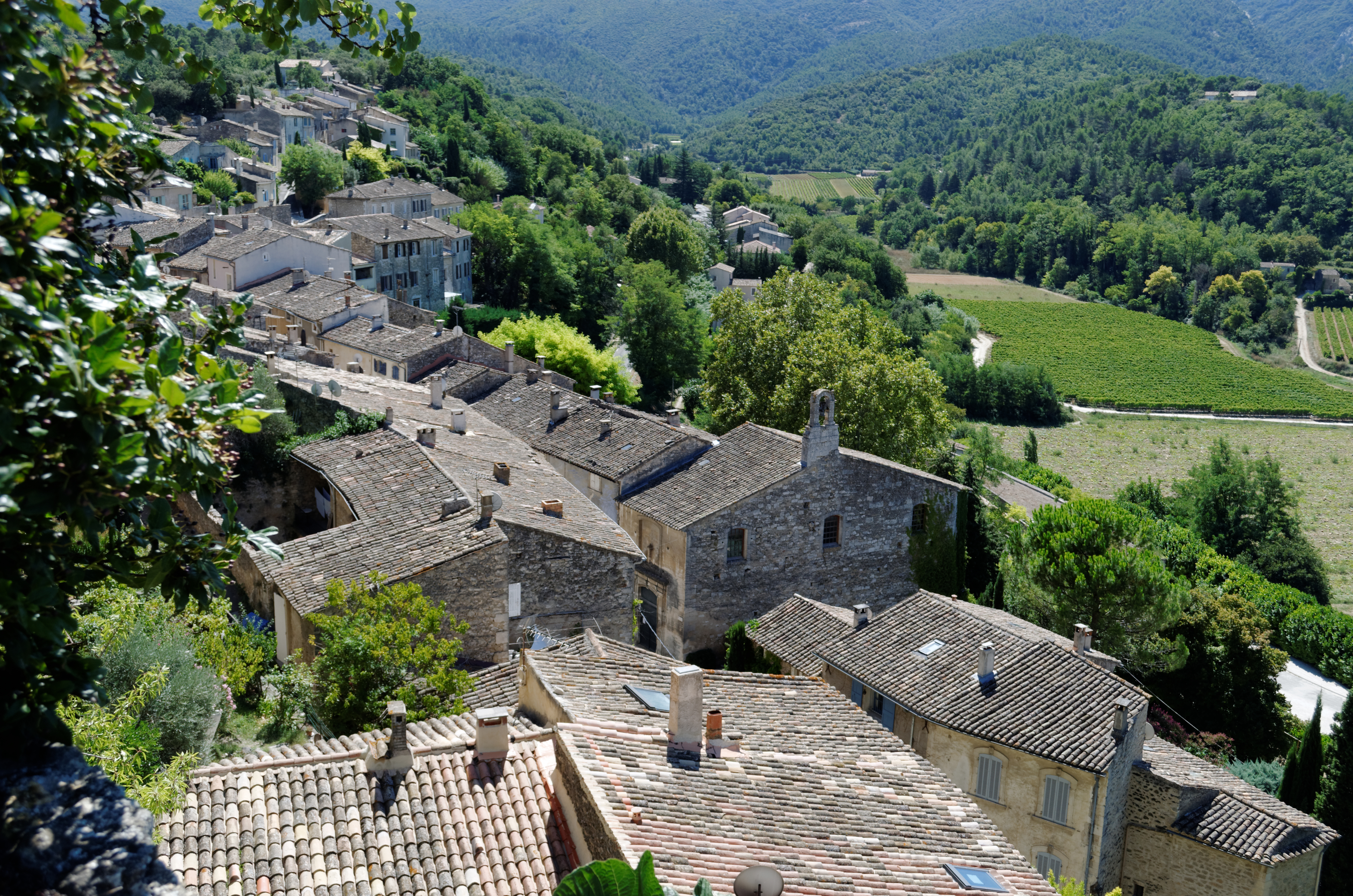
Ménerbes, Provence, where David spent three months in 1951

A Book of Mediterranean Food was successful enough for Lehmann to commission David to write a sequel, to show the dishes of rural France. This was French Country Cooking, which David finished writing in October 1950. Minton was employed to illustrate the work, and David gave him detailed instructions about the type of drawings; she was more pleased with them than those for her first work. Despite their difficult relationship, David dedicated the book to her mother. Before the book was published, David left England to live for a short time in France. She was motivated by a desire to gain a wider knowledge of life in the French countryside, and to put distance between her and her husband. She left London in March 1951 for Ménerbes, Provence. She spent three months in Provence; although the weather was initially cold and wet, it soon turned warmer and she enjoyed herself so much that she considered buying a house there. In June 1951 she left Ménerbes and travelled to the island of Capri to visit Norman Douglas. When she left in late August, she toured briefly around the Italian Riviera researching for an article for Go, before returning to London.

In September, shortly after her return, French Country Cooking was published. It was warmly reviewed by critics, although Lucie Marion, writing in The Manchester Guardian, considered that "I cannot think that Mrs David has tried actually to make many of the dishes for which she gives recipes". David wrote to the paper to set the record straight, saying that it would have been "irresponsible and mischievous" if she had not tested them all.

=== Italian, French and other cuisines ===
Lehmann and David agreed that her next book should be about Italian food; at the time, little was known in Britain about Italian cuisine and interest in the country was on the rise. She received an advance of £300 for the book. She planned to visit Italy for research, and wanted to see Douglas in Capri again, but received news of his death in February 1952, which left her deeply saddened.

David left London in March, arriving in Rome just before the Easter celebrations. She toured the country, watching cooks at home and in restaurants and making extensive notes on the regional differences in the cuisine. While in Rome she met the painter Renato Guttuso; deeply impressed by his work, particularly his still lifes, she asked if he would illustrate her book. To her surprise he agreed and, while considering the fee of £60 absurdly low, he kept to his word and produced a series of illustrations.

Arriving back in London in October 1952, David began a relationship with an old flame from India, Peter Higgins, a divorced stockbroker; it was the beginning of the happiest period of her life. She spent the following months writing the book, recreating the recipes to work out the correct measurements. She felt less emotionally connected to Italy than with Greece and southern France and found the writing "uncommonly troublesome", although "as recipe after recipe came out ... I realized how much I was learning, and how enormously these dishes were enlarging my own scope and enjoyment". Italian Food was published in November 1954. At the time, many of the ingredients used in the recipes were still difficult to obtain in Britain. Looking back in 1963, David wrote:

In Soho but almost nowhere else, such things as Italian pasta, and Parmesan cheese, olive oil, salame, and occasionally Parma ham were to be had. ... With southern vegetables such as aubergines, red and green peppers, fennel, the tiny marrows called by the French courgettes and in Italy zucchini, much the same situation prevailed.

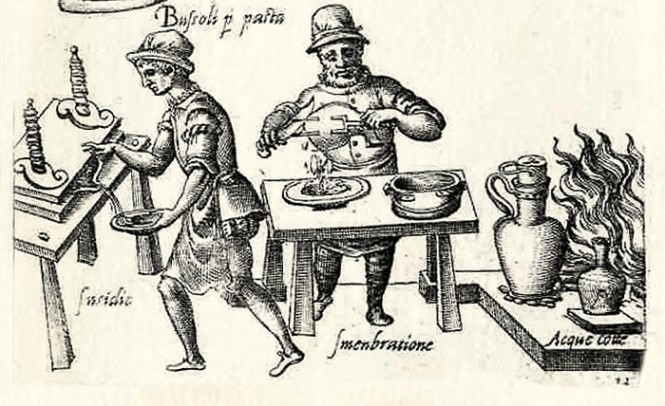
In addition to Renato Guttuso's illustrations, Italian Food also contained artwork from older cookbooks, including Bartolomeo Scappi's Opera di Bartolomeo Scappi, published in 1622.

Italian Food was warmly received by reviewers and the public, and the first print run sold out within three weeks. The Times Literary Supplement's reviewer wrote, "More than a collection of recipes, this book is in effect a readable and discerning dissertation on Italian food and regional dishes, and their preparation in the English kitchen." Freya Stark, reviewing for The Observer, remarked, "Mrs David ... may be counted among the benefactors of humanity." In The Sunday Times, Evelyn Waugh named Italian Food as one of the two books that had given him the most pleasure in 1954.

By the time she completed Italian Food, Lehmann's publishing firm had been closed down by its parent company, and David found herself under contract to Macdonald, another imprint within the same group. She intensely disliked the company and wrote a most unflattering portrait of it in a 1985 article. Disapproving of the approach to her books that the company took, her agent, Paul Scott, persuaded Macdonald to relinquish their option on the next book. David signed instead with the publisher Museum Press for her next book, Summer Cooking, which was published in 1955.

Summer Cooking was illustrated by David's friend, the artist Adrian Daintrey. He would visit her at home and sketch her in the kitchen while she cooked a lunch for them both. Unconstrained by the geographical agendas of her first three books, David wrote about dishes from Britain, India, Mauritius, Russia, Spain and Turkey, as well as France, Italy and Greece. The book reflected her strong belief in eating food in season; she loved "the pleasure of rediscovering each season's vegetables" and thought it "rather dull to eat the same food all year round". She said that her aim was to put:

emphasis on two aspects of cookery which are increasingly disregarded: the suitability of certain foods to certain times of the year, and the pleasures of eating the vegetables, fruits, poultry, meat or fish which is in season, therefore at its best, most plentiful, and cheapest.

Soon after the publication of Summer Cooking, David was wooed away from her regular column in Harper's by Vogue magazine, which offered her more money and more prominence—a full central page with a continuing column following, and a full page photograph. The new contract meant she also wrote for Vogue's sister magazine House & Garden. Audrey Withers, the editor of Vogue, wanted David to write more personal columns than she had done for Harper's, and paid her £20 a month for food ingredients and from time to time £100 for research trips to France.

David visited several areas of France, completing her research for her next book, French Provincial Cooking, which was "the culmination and synthesis of a decade of work and thought". Published in 1960, it is, according to Cooper in the Oxford Dictionary of National Biography, the book for which she would be best remembered. David's agent negotiated contracts with a new publisher, Michael Joseph, and a new illustrator, Juliet Renny.

Reviews of the new book were as complimentary as those for its predecessors. The Times Literary Supplement wrote, "French Provincial Cooking needs to be read rather than referred to quickly. It discourses at some length on the type and origin of the dishes popular in various French regions, as well as the culinary terms, herbs and kitchen equipment used in France. But those who can give the extra time to this book will be well repaid by dishes such as La Bourride de Charles Bérot and Cassoulet Colombié." (Note: Respectively, a Provençal dish of fillets of white fish in an aïoli and cream sauce, and a Languedoc casserole of beans with pork, mutton, sausage and goose.) The Observer said that it was difficult to think of any home that could do without the book and called David "a very special kind of genius".

French Provincial Cooking was dedicated to Peter Higgins, still her lover. David's estranged husband had lived in Spain since 1953 and, to his wife's embarrassment, he was named in a divorce case which was reported in the gossip column of The Daily Express. In an interview published in the newspaper, Tony had referred to David as "my ex-wife"; she filed for divorce, and the process was finalised in 1960.

=== 1960s ===
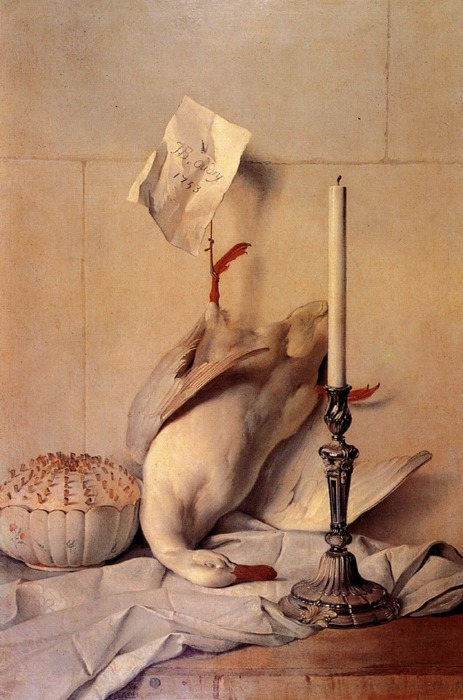
Jean-Baptiste Oudry's The White Duck was used as the cover for the 1970 Penguin edition of French Provincial Cooking.

In 1960 David stopped writing for The Sunday Times, as she was unhappy about editorial interference with her copy; soon afterwards she also left Vogue as the change in direction of the magazine did not suit the style of her column. She joined the weekly publications The Spectator, Sunday Dispatch and The Sunday Telegraph. Her books were now reaching a wide public, having been reprinted in paperback by the mass-market publisher Penguin Books, where they sold more than a million copies between 1955 and 1985. Her work also had an impact on British food culture: the historian Peter Clarke considers that "The seminal influence of Elizabeth David's French Provincial Cooking (1960), with its enormous sales as a Penguin paperback, deserves historical recognition." (Note: By 1964 David's first five books were all available in paperback, and reaching a new generation of readers.) Cooper considers that David's "professional career was at its height. She was hailed not only as Britain's foremost writer on food and cookery, but as the woman who had transformed the eating habits of middle-class England."

David's private life was less felicitous. In April 1963 her affair with Higgins came to an end when he remarried. For a period she drank too much brandy and resorted too often to sleeping pills. Probably as a result of these factors and overwork, in 1963, when she was 49, David suffered a cerebral haemorrhage. She kept the news of the event within her close circle of friends—none of the editors of the publications she worked for were aware of the collapse—as she did not want her reputation as a hard worker to be damaged. She recovered, but her confidence was badly shaken and her sense of taste was temporarily affected; for a period she could not taste salt, or the effect salt had on what she was cooking, but her sense of the smell of frying onions was so enhanced as to be unpleasant for her.

In November 1965, together with four business partners, David opened Elizabeth David Ltd, a shop selling kitchen equipment, at 46 Bourne Street, Pimlico. The partners were spurred on by the closure of a professional kitchenware shop in Soho on the retirement of its owner, and the recent success of Terence Conran's Habitat shops, which sold among much else imported kitchen equipment for which there was evidently a market. Among her customers were Albert and Michel Roux, who shopped there for equipment that they would otherwise have had to buy in France.

David, who selected the stock, was uncompromising in her choice of merchandise; despite its large range of kitchen implements, the shop did not stock either wall-mounted knife sharpeners or garlic presses. David wrote an article called "Garlic Presses are Utterly Useless", refused to sell them, and advised customers who demanded them to go elsewhere. (Note: David maintained that the crushing action of garlic presses caused only the juice of the garlic to be extracted, which then tasted acrid. She recommended crushing a peeled garlic clove with the flat blade of a heavy knife and adding a little salt.) Not available elsewhere, by contrast, were booklets by David printed specially for the shop. Some of them were later incorporated into the collections of her essays and articles, An Omelette and a Glass of Wine and Is There a Nutmeg in the House? (Note: These were: Dried Herbs, Aromatics and Condiments (1967); English Potted Meats and Fish Pastes (1968); The Baking of an English Loaf (1969); Syllabubs and Fruit Fools (1969); and Green Pepper Berries: A New Taste (1972).) The shop was described in The Observer as:

... starkly simple. Pyramids of French coffee cups and English pot-bellied iron pans stand in the window. ... Iron shelves hold tin moulds and cutters of every description, glazed and unglazed earthenware pots, bowls and dishes in traditional colours, plain pots and pans in thick aluminium, cast-iron, vitreous enamel and fireproof porcelain, unadorned crockery in classic shapes and neat rows of cooks' knives, spoons and forks.

David reduced her writing commitments to concentrate on running the shop, but contributed some articles to magazines, and began to focus more on English cuisine. She still included many recipes but increasingly wrote about places—markets, auberges, farms—and people, including profiles of famous chefs and gourmets such as Marcel Boulestin and Édouard de Pomiane. In her later articles, she expressed strongly held views on a wide range of subjects; she abominated the word "crispy", demanding to know what it conveyed that "crisp" did not; (Note: Later cooks including Nigella Lawson and Simon Hopkinson remained keenly aware of David's disapproval of the word.) she confessed to an inability to refill anybody's wineglass until it was empty; (Note: This was a legacy of Norman Douglas's tutelage: "'I wish you would listen when I tell you that if you fill my glass before it's empty I shan't know how much I've drunk.' To this day I cannot bring myself to refill someone else's glass until it is empty.") she insisted on the traditional form "Welsh rabbit" rather than the modern invention "Welsh rarebit"; she poured scorn on the Guide Michelin's standards; she deplored "fussy garnish ... distract[ing] from the main flavours"; she inveighed against the ersatz: "anyone depraved enough to invent a dish consisting of a wedge of steam-heated bread spread with tomato paste and a piece of synthetic Cheddar can call it a pizza."

While running the shop, David wrote another full-length book, Spices, Salt and Aromatics in the English Kitchen (1970). It was her first book in a decade and the first of a projected series on English cookery to be called "English Cooking, Ancient and Modern". She had decided to concentrate on the subject while recuperating from her cerebral haemorrhage in 1963. The book was a departure from her earlier works and contained more food history about what she called "the English preoccupation with the spices and the scents, the fruit, the flavourings, the sources and the condiments of the orient, near and far".

=== Later years ===
Edwardian cooking range: an illustration in English Bread and Yeast Cookery (1977)

Elizabeth David Ltd was never more than modestly profitable, but David would not lower her standards in search of a commercial return. A new manager was brought in to run the shop and David fought against many of his changes, but she was always in the minority against her fellow directors. The stress of disagreements over company policy—and the deaths of her sister Diana in March 1971 and her mother in June 1973—contributed to health problems and she suffered from chronic fatigue and swollen, ulcerous legs. Gradually her business partners found her commercial approach unsustainable, and in 1973 she left the company. To her annoyance, the shop continued to trade under her name, although she tried periodically to persuade her former colleagues to change it.

David's second book on English food was English Bread and Yeast Cookery, which she spent five years researching and writing. The work covered the history of bread-making in England and an examination of each ingredient used. She was angered by the standard of bread in Britain and wrote:

What is utterly dismaying is the mess our milling and baking concerns succeed in making with the dearly bought grain that goes into their grist. Quite simply it is wasted on a nation that cares so little about the quality of its bread that it has allowed itself to be mesmerized into buying the equivalent of eight and a quarter million large white factory-made loaves every day of the year. (Note: In the book, David reproduced a newspaper cartoon published during a bakers' strike in 1974, showing one housewife telling another, "I've been giving them sliced bathroom sponge, and they haven't noticed yet.")

In 1977 David was badly injured in a car accident—sustaining a fractured left elbow and right wrist, a damaged knee cap and a broken jaw—from which she took a long time to recover. While she was in hospital, English Bread and Yeast Cookery was published. Its scholarship won high praise, and Jane Grigson, writing in The Times Literary Supplement, suggested that a copy of the book should be given to every marrying couple, while Hilary Spurling, reviewing for The Observer, thought that not only was it "a scathing indictment of the British bread industry", but one done with "orderliness, authority, phenomenal scope and fastidious attention to detail".

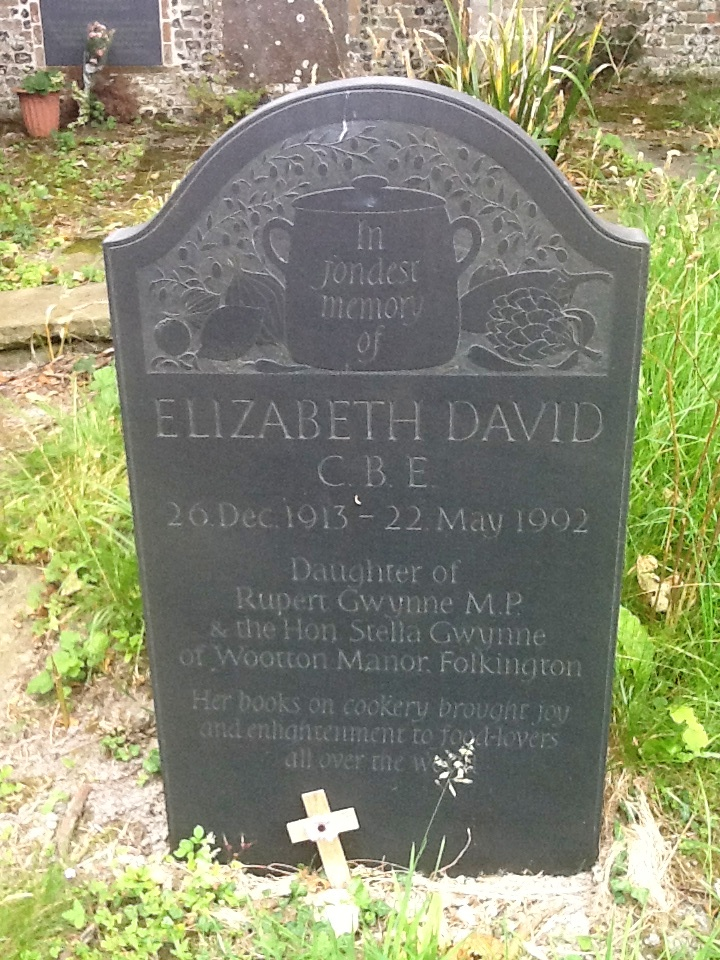
Elizabeth David's grave, St Peter's, Folkington

Some of the research David undertook for English Bread and Yeast Cookery was done with Jill Norman, her friend and publisher. The pair decided that they should produce two further books: Ice and Ices and a collection of David's early journalism. Like her book on bread, the scope for Ice and Ices grew the more David researched the subject. The compilation of existing essays and press articles took less time, and in 1984 An Omelette and a Glass of Wine was published, edited by Norman who became David's literary executor and edited further David works after the author's death.

The death in 1986 of her younger sister Felicité, who had lived in the top floor of her house for thirty years, was a severe blow to David. She began to suffer from depression and went to the doctor after suffering chest pains; he diagnosed tuberculosis and she was hospitalised. After an uncomfortable time over a three-month stay in hospital, where the drugs she was prescribed had side-effects that affected her clarity of thinking, her friend, the wine importer and writer Gerald Asher, arranged for her to stay with him in California to recuperate.

David made several visits to California, which she much enjoyed, but her health began to fail. Because her legs had been troublesome for some time, she suffered a succession of falls which resulted in several spells in hospital. She became increasingly reclusive but, despite spending periods in bed at home, she continued to work on Ice and Ices. She realised that she would not be able to finish the work, and asked Norman to complete it for her. It was published in 1994, under the title Harvest of the Cold Months.

In May 1992 David suffered a stroke followed two days later by another, which was fatal; she died at her Chelsea home on 22 May 1992, aged 78. She was buried on 28 May at the family church of St Peter ad Vincula, Folkington. That September a memorial service was held at St Martin-in-the-Fields, London, followed by a memorial picnic at the Institute of Contemporary Arts. (Note: Among the mourners were cooks, including Julia Child, Sophie Grigson, Simon Hopkinson, Anton Mosimann, Jennifer Paterson and Alice Waters; and writers including Derek Cooper, Matthew Fort, Hugh Johnson and Jancis Robinson. At the picnic, prepared by Hopkinson of Bibendum, Sally Clarke of Clarke's and Martin Lam of L'Escargot, dishes were made from David's recipes: bocconcini with basil leaves; marinated lentil and goat cheese salad; baby beetroot and chives; spiced aubergine salad; Piedmontese peppers; salade de museau; grilled tuna, red onion and beans; and autumn fruits with fromage frais.) In February 1994 David's possessions were put up for auction. Many of those who attended—and who bid—were fans of David's work, rather than professional dealers. Prue Leith paid £1,100 for David's old kitchen table because it was "where she cooked her omelettes and wrote most of her books". The auction's total receipts were three times the expected value.

== Books ==
Books by Elizabeth David

	Publisher	Year	Pages	Illustrator	OCLC/ISBN	Notes & refs
A Book of Mediterranean Food	John Lehmann	1950	191	John Minton	OCLC 1363273	
The Use of Wine in Fine Cooking	Saccone and Speed	1950	12	–	OCLC 315839710	
French Country Cooking	John Lehmann	1951	247	John Minton	OCLC 38915667	
The Use of Wine in Italian Cooking	Saccone and Speed	1952	19	–	OCLC 25461747	
Italian Food	Macdonald	1954	335	Renato Guttuso	OCLC 38915667	
Summer Cooking	Museum Press	1955	256	Adrian Daintrey	OCLC 6439374	
French Provincial Cooking	Michael Joseph	1960	493	Juliet Renny	OCLC 559285062	
Dried Herbs, Aromatics and Condiments	Elizabeth David Ltd	1967	20	–	OCLC 769267360	
English Potted Meats and Fish Pastes	Elizabeth David Ltd	1968	20	–	OCLC 928158148	
The Baking of an English Loaf	Elizabeth David Ltd	1969	24	–	ISBN 978-0-901794-00-0	
Syllabubs and Fruit Fools	Elizabeth David Ltd	1969	20	–	OCLC 928158148	
Cooking with Le Creuset	E D Clarbat	1969	38	–	OCLC 86055309	
Spices, Salt and Aromatics in the English Kitchen	Penguin	1970	279	–	ISBN 978-0-14-046163-3	
Green Pepper Berries: A New Taste	Elizabeth David Ltd	1972	9	–	OCLC 985520523	
English Bread and Yeast Cookery	Penguin	1977	591	Wendy Jones	ISBN 978-0-14-046299-9	
An Omelette and a Glass of Wine	Robert Hale	1984	320	various	ISBN 978-0-7090-2047-9	
Harvest of the Cold Months: The Social History of Ice and Ices	Michael Joseph	1994	413	various	ISBN 978-0-7181-3703-8	
I'll be with You in the Squeezing of a Lemon	Penguin	1995	89	–	ISBN 978-0-14-600020-1	(Note: The larger posthumously-published books of David's writings are credited to Jill Norman as editor, but no editor is credited for this small book.)
Peperonata and Other Italian Dishes	Penguin	1996	64	–	ISBN 978-0-14-600140-6	(Note: Drawn from Italian Food and other previously-published David titles. In a companion series with I'll be with You in the Squeezing of a Lemon. As in the earlier small-format book, no editor is named.)
South Wind Through the Kitchen: The Best of Elizabeth David	Michael Joseph	1997	384	various	ISBN 978-0-7181-4168-4	(Note: Selections of recipes and essays from previously-published books by David, introduced by chefs and writers including Prue Leith, Terence Conran, Simon Hopkinson, Alice Waters, Richard Olney and Paul Levy.)
Is There a Nutmeg in the House?	Michael Joseph	2000	322	various	ISBN 978-0-7181-4444-9	
Elizabeth David's Christmas	Michael Joseph	2003	214	Jason Lowe	ISBN 978-0-7181-4670-2	
Of Pageants and Picnics	Penguin	2005	58	–	ISBN 978-0-14-102259-8	
At Elizabeth David's Table: Her Very Best Everyday Recipes	Michael Joseph	2010	383	David Loftus and Jon Gray	ISBN 978-0-7181-5475-2	(Note: David's recipes introduced by cooks of later generations including Hugh Fearnley-Whittingstall, Rose Gray, Simon Hopkinson and Jamie Oliver.)
A Taste of the Sun	Penguin	2011	118	Renato Guttuso	ISBN 978-0-241-95108-8	(Note: Chapters and articles from French Country Cooking, Of Pageants and Picnics, Italian Food, Is There a Nutmeg in the House?, French Provincial Cooking, English Bread and Yeast Cookery and An Omelette and a Glass of Wine.)
Elizabeth David on Vegetables	Quadrille	2013	191	Kristin Perers	ISBN 978-1-84949-268-3	(Note: Drawn principally from Mediterranean Food, Italian Food, French Provincial Cooking and An Omelette and a Glass of Wine.)

From 1950 onwards David was well known for her magazine articles and, in the 1960s and '70s, for her kitchen shop, but her reputation rested and still rests principally on her books. The first five, published between 1950 and 1960, cover the cuisine (Note: David looked askance at the word "cuisine" when used by English writers, calling it "that suspect travel-brochure word".) of continental Europe and beyond. In the 1970s David wrote two books about English cooking. The last of her books published in her lifetime was a collection of previously printed essays and articles. From the extensive notes and archives left by the author, her literary executor, Jill Norman, edited and completed four more books that David had planned. Six other books published since the author's death have been compilations drawn from her existing works.

On the advice of her publisher, David constructed her early books to intersperse recipes with relevant excerpts of travel writing and scene-painting by earlier writers, and, as her confidence and reputation grew, by herself. A Book of Mediterranean Food (1950) draws on nine authors, from Henry James to Théophile Gautier, in between eleven sections of recipes. (Note: These authors also included Norman Douglas, Lawrence Durrell, Gertrude Stein, D. H. Lawrence, Osbert Sitwell, Compton Mackenzie and Arnold Bennett.) Reviewers commented that David's books possessed literary merit as well as practical instruction.

Victorian advertisement reproduced in English Bread and Yeast Cookery

Some critics, used to more prescriptive cookery writers, thought her approach assumed too much knowledge on the part of the reader. In her view, "The ideal cookery writer is one who makes his readers want to cook as well as telling them how it is done; he should leave something, not too much perhaps, but a little, unsaid: people must make their own discoveries, use their own intelligence, otherwise they will be deprived of part of the fun." (Note: For those who sought more precise instructions, David recommended, among other books, Mastering the Art of French Cooking (1960) by Simone Beck, Louisette Bertholle and Julia Child of which she said in French Provincial Cooking: "A very remarkable work indeed, dealing mainly with the finer French cooking. The techniques explained, and more authentically and fully explained than in any previous cookery book in the English language, are applicable to all French cooking of whatever category. ... An important reference book for every serious cook, amateur or professional." Among other contemporaries whose books David recommended were Jane Grigson and Alan Davidson.) In The New York Times Craig Claiborne wrote admiringly of David, but remarked that because she assumed her readers already knew the basics of cooking she would be "valued more by those with a serious regard for food than by those with a casual interest". (Note: Reviewing French Provincial Cooking, Claiborne commented that David's instructions could be as brief as "Prepare a very thick mayonnaise with two or even three egg yolks". Claiborne's own instructions on making mayonnaise in his A Kitchen Primer run to three pages. David had earlier given detailed advice on making mayonnaise in Summer Cooking, devoting more than 400 words to the subject, and later wrote a piece on the subject that runs to seven and a half pages in Is There a Nutmeg in the House?) The writer Julian Barnes commented that as an amateur cook he found David's terse instructions intimidating: of a recipe in Italian Food he wrote, "E.D.'s first sentence reads like this: 'Melt 1½ lbs (675 g) chopped and skinned tomatoes in olive oil' ... Melt? Melt a tomato? ... Could it be that Elizabeth David was too good a writer to be a food writer?" A later cook, Tom Parker Bowles, observes, "You don't turn to Elizabeth David for nannying, step-by-step instruction, or precise amounts and timing. She assumes you know the basics, and is a writer who offers inspiration, and wonderful, opinionated prose. Her recipes are timeless, and all her books wonderful works of reference (and tirelessly researched) as well as beautiful reads."

The eight books and eight booklets by David published in her lifetime cover the food of France; Italy; the rest of the Mediterranean and beyond, into Asia; and England.

=== France ===
Two of David's best-known books focus on the cuisine of France: French Country Cooking (1951) and French Provincial Cooking (1960); France features prominently, though not exclusively, in another two: A Book of Mediterranean Food (1950) and Summer Cooking (1955). She set the pattern for her books by grouping recipes by category, with sections linked by her chosen passages from literature. In her first book, Mediterranean Food, David presented chapters on soups; eggs and luncheon dishes; fish; meat; substantial dishes; poultry and game; vegetables; cold food and salads; sweets; jams, chutneys and preserves; and sauces. She broadly followed this pattern in her next four books. David's view on the place of French cooking in the hierarchy of world cuisine is set out in her introduction to French Country Cooking: "French regional and peasant cookery ... at its best, is the most delicious in the world; cookery which uses raw materials to the greatest advantage without going to the absurd lengths of the complicated and so-called Haute Cuisine." She was a firm believer in the traditional French approach to buying and preparing food:

Good cooking is honest, sincere and simple, and by this I do not mean to imply that you will find in this, or indeed any other book, the secret of turning out first-class food in a few minutes with no trouble. Good food is always a trouble and its preparation should be regarded as a labour of love, and this book is intended for those who actually and positively enjoy the labour involved in entertaining their friends and providing their families with first-class food.

Though not neglecting elaborate dishes—she devoted six pages to the choice of ingredients for and cooking of pot-au-feu or lièvre à la Royale (a salmis of hare)—David regarded simple everyday cooking as in some ways more demanding, and gave many recipes for "the kind of food which is eaten frequently in thrifty French households, and it is very good".

David emphasised the importance to cooks of careful and knowledgeable shopping for ingredients. She wrote chapters about French markets such as those at Cavaillon, Yvetot, Montpellier, Martigues and Valence. Despite a widespread perception that her view of food was essentially Mediterranean, French Provincial Cooking, by far her longest book to date, surveyed the cuisine of France from Normandy and the Île-de-France to Alsace, Burgundy, the Loire, Bordeaux and the Basque Country, as well as the south. Looking at the entire field of cookery books, Jane Grigson regarded this as "the best and most stimulating of them all".

=== Italy ===
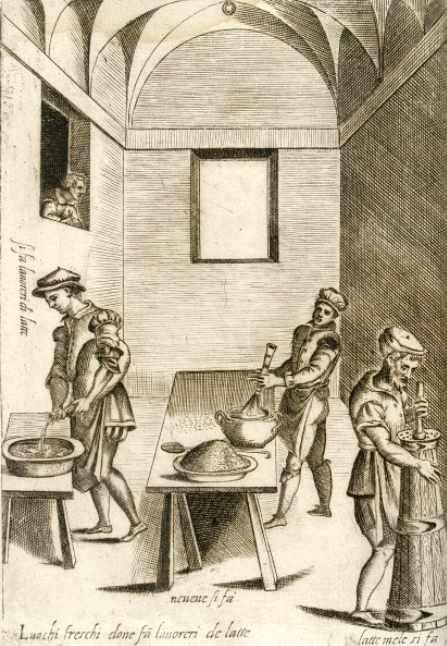
Illustration of medieval cookery by Bartolomeo Scappi (1570), reproduced in Italian Food

Unlike its two predecessors, Mediterranean Food and French Country Cooking, David's Italian Food (1954) drew little from anything she had already written. She spent many months in Italy researching it before starting work on the manuscript. (Note: She preferred to write in longhand rather than type, and was a slow and painstaking drafter, revising continually. Her sister Felicité, a capable typist, produced the typescript of the books and articles from David's completed manuscripts.) With two successful books already published, David felt less in need of extracts from earlier writers to bolster her prose, and interspersed the recipes with her own essays and introductions to the various sections. The book begins with a chapter on "The Italian store cupboard", giving British cooks, who at that time were generally unacquainted with most of Italy's cuisine and methods, an insight into Italian herbs, spices, tinned, bottled or dried staples including anchovies, tuna, funghi, prosciutto, and chickpeas, and Italian essentials such as garlic and olive oil, both seldom seen in Britain in the early 1950s. The rest of the book follows the basic pattern of the earlier works, with chapters on soups, fish, meat, vegetables and sweets, with the addition of extra subjects relevant to Italian food, pasta asciuta, ravioli and gnocchi, rice, and Italian wine.

In addition to those in Italian Food, there are many Italian recipes and descriptions of the land and the people in David's other works. The first recipe in her first book, Mediterranean Food—soupe au Pistou—is of Genoese origin. Also in that book are recipes for bocconcini, (Note: Slices of veal and ham rolled and stuffed with cheese, breadcrumbed and fried in butter.) osso bucco, and several Italian pasta and chicken dishes. Among the recipes in Summer Cooking is peperonata (pimentos or sweet peppers cooked with tomatoes in olive oil and butter) which was reprinted as the title article in a later selection from David's works. In An Omelette and a Glass of Wine, David printed Italian recipes including soups and omelettes made with hops (zuppa di lupolli and frittata con i loertis). Also in that book are substantial essays on Italian people and places. Is There a Nutmeg in the House? includes a six-page article on vegetable dishes from Mantua, and another of similar length on the variations of pizza in Italy and beyond.

=== Other Mediterranean lands and beyond ===
When David's first book, Mediterranean Food, was published in 1950 the British public was still enduring food rationing after the Second World War. Her evocation of the everyday plenty and excellence of Mediterranean food was revelatory, and although she did not reach a wide public until cheap paperback editions of her books came out in the mid 1950s, reviewers immediately spotted her importance. (Note: The Penguin paperback at half a crown (two shillings and sixpence, or 12½ p) cost less than a quarter of the price of the original hardback issue at half a guinea (ten shillings and sixpence, or 52½ p).)

In the introduction to Mediterranean Food David set out her basic premise: "The cooking of the Mediterranean shores, endowed with all the natural resources, the colour and flavour of the South, is a blend of tradition and brilliant improvisation. The Latin genius flashes from the kitchen pans. It is honest cooking, too; none of the sham Grande Cuisine of the International Palace Hotel." She conceded, nevertheless, that the food culture of the Mediterranean was not exclusively Latin, and flowered in "the mainland of Greece and the much-disputed territories of Syria, the Lebanon, Constantinople and Smyrna". She described the ever-recurring elements in the food throughout these countries as:

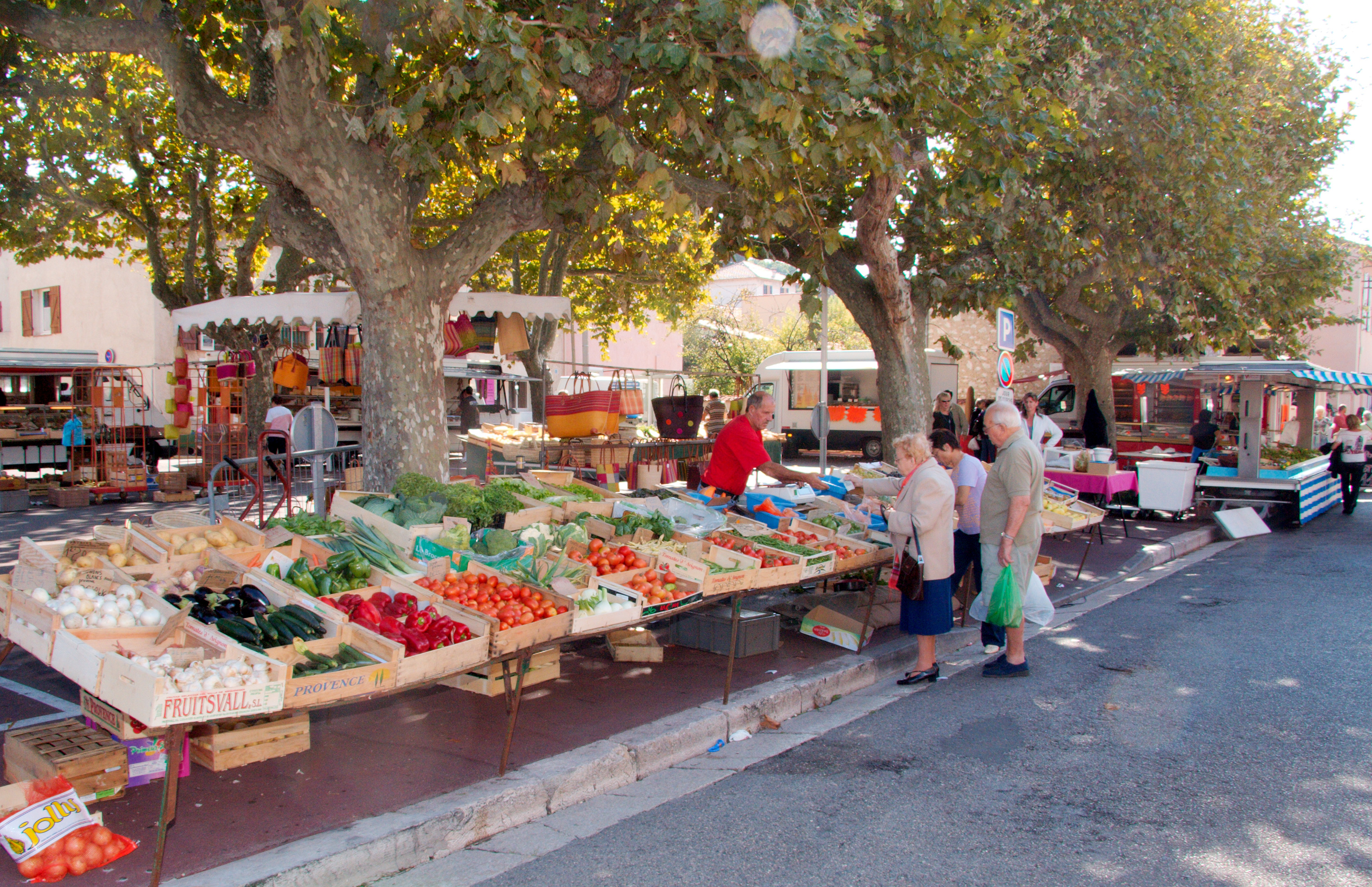
Market stalls in the south of France "piled high with pimentos, aubergines, tomatoes ..."

... the oil, the saffron, the garlic, the pungent local wines; the aromatic perfume of rosemary, wild marjoram and basil drying in the kitchens; the brilliance of the market stalls piled high with pimentos, aubergines, tomatoes, olives, melons, figs and limes; the great heaps of shiny fish, silver, vermilion or tiger-striped, and those long needle fish whose bones so mysteriously turn out to be green.

In her other books David gives recipes from around the Mediterranean, including gazpacho and tortillas from Spain; dolmádés, and eggs with skordalia from Greece, mutton-stuffed aubergines, yoghurt soup, and a stew of carrots and rice from Turkey; and a Syrian dish of chicken with almonds and cream. From further afield she includes Mauritian prawn chutney; iced cucumber and beetroot soup from Russia; a Persian maqlub of aubergines, rice and mutton; Sikh kebabs and garam masala from India; and Armenian pizza, claimed to be older than the Italian version.

In a 2012 survey for the Australasian Universities Language and Literature Association, Carody Culver writes, "It is David's language, particularly her use of description that most strongly enforces the narrative and literary quality of Mediterranean Food. Her imagery, anecdotes, and literary quotes transform her recipes into stories of experience and memory. ... Ingredients and dishes are not just given as part of a list of instructions, but represented as part of a specific culture."

=== England ===
Spices, Salt and Aromatics in the English Kitchen (1970) and English Bread and Yeast Cookery (1977) include a few British dishes from outside England, such as Scottish Arbroath smokies and bannocks; and Welsh salt duck and bara brith. David, like many of her generation and class, used the terms "England" and "English" to refer to the whole of Britain.

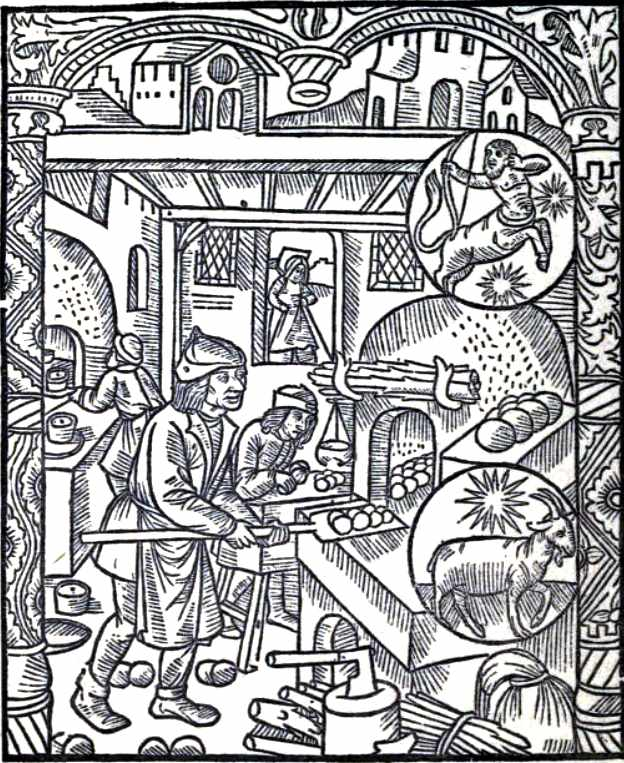
Sixteenth-century woodcut showing a baker and a pastry-cook, printed in English Bread and Yeast Cookery

Some writers have believed David neglected the cooking of her own country in favour of Mediterranean cuisine. In the humorous magazine Punch, Humphrey Lyttelton held that she preferred "inaccessible and often indigestible saucissons" to "the splendid Cumberland sausage". In 2009 the food writer Tim Hayward accused her of "wide-eyed romantic twaddle", excessively focused on France and the Mediterranean. Chaney comments that when Spices, Salt and Aromatics in the English Kitchen was published in 1970, some of David's most ardent admirers were taken aback to find her extolling the British culinary tradition, "at its best ... as rich and rewarding as that of the Mediterranean". Cooper writes that although the change of focus from French and Mediterranean food to English surprised the public, David had been moving towards it for some time.

David treated her English topics in considerable detail: Spices, Salt and Aromatics in the English Kitchen is longer than Mediterranean Food, French Country Cooking or Summer Cooking. She intended it to be the first in a series of three or even five books on English cookery: "It depends how much time I have ... Later volumes will deal with bread, yeast, cakes, creams and cheeses and egg dishes, and meat and game". They were never written, except for English Bread and Yeast Cookery, which is by nearly 100 pages the longest of all David's works.

David consciously followed in the path of Hilda Leyel and Dorothy Hartley in researching British ingredients and dishes. (Note: Other English influences acknowledged and described by David include Eliza Acton from the early nineteenth century and Lady Clark of Tillypronie in the following generation.) Like them, she looked back into regional history to find what she saw as "the traditions of a culture rooted to the soil" before "the ravages of the Industrial Revolution". She did not romanticise Britain's culinary past: "Farm and factory labourers, artisans and clerical workers, still lived on a very restricted diet ... their cooking facilities were so primitive and their equipment so scanty that only the most basic forms of cookery could be attempted". But her constant benchmarks were honest ingredients and uncomplicated cooking. She condemned—and explained the alternatives to—the artificial, the ersatz, the "notorious Chorleywood bread", and "all synthetic aids to flavouring ... Nobody has ever been able to find out why the English regard a glass of wine added to a soup or stew as a reckless extravagance and at the same time spend pounds on bottled sauces, gravy powders, soup cubes, ketchups and artificial flavourings".

Both the English books are in two parts. The first section is historical, putting the subject into context for the modern reader. In Spices, Salt and Aromatics David writes about the background of the herbs and spices and condiments that came into use in British kitchens over the previous centuries, and sketches the history of their adoption from Asia and continental Europe. The Times Literary Supplement called this part of the book "as difficult to put down as a good thriller". David follows a similar path in English Bread and Yeast Cookery; reviewing the book Hilary Spurling wrote that it contained "a history of virtually every development since Stone Age crops and querns". The second, longer, sections of the two books contain the recipes and descriptions.

=== Collections of essays and articles ===
Frontispiece of L'Art de bien faire les glaces d'office (1768) reproduced in "Hunt the Ice Cream" in Is There a Nutmeg in the House?

Although David had drawn on her many magazine articles for material in her earlier books, An Omelette and Glass of Wine (1984) was the first straightforward anthology of her work. Compiled with the assistance of Jill Norman, it consists of David's selections from her essays and articles published since 1949. (Note: David wrote that the pieces had appeared originally in publications "from the Sunday Times to Nova, from Vogue to the Spectator, from the long defunct travel magazine Go to Cyril Ray's Compleat Imbiber, Peter Dominic's Wine Mine and a quite a few others".)

The article from which the book takes its title is an essay on "the almost primitive and elemental meal evoked by the words: 'Let's just have an omelette and a glass of wine.'" Among the other subjects are profiles of people including Norman Douglas, Marcel Boulestin, Mrs Beeton, and "A gourmet in Edwardian London", Colonel Nathaniel Newnham-Davis. Several sections are devoted to descriptions of the markets of French country towns, and unpretentious restaurants and hotels in France. There are articles on lemons, potted meat, mayonnaise, pizza, syllabubs, truffles, and on the cuisines of Spain and Morocco. For most of the articles David provided either an introduction or an afternote, or both.

David had intended to publish a second such volume, and eight years after the author's death, Norman, her literary executor, published a sequel, Is There a Nutmeg in the House? (2000). Like its predecessor, it was drawn from magazine articles, essays and other earlier writings, to which Norman added articles written by David in the 1980s. The first section of the book is a short autobiographical piece, a rarity from David, who guarded her privacy carefully. David's interest in the historical aspects of cuisine is given scope in essays on the history of Oxo and Bovril, Alexis Soyer and the potato. Articles aimed at the domestic cook include "Do not Despair over Rice", "Making Ice Cream", and one propounding a view for which she was famous: "Garlic Presses are Utterly Useless". The New York Times called the book "this very appealing, completely absorbing miscellany. ... This is a book good enough to eat—and, in a way, you can."

=== Booklets ===
David wrote eight booklets on individual topics. The first two, The Use of Wine in Fine Cooking (1950) and The Use of Wine in Italian Cooking (1952), were commissioned and published by the wine merchants Saccone and Speed. David reused the first as a chapter in French Country Cooking.

For her kitchen equipment shop, David wrote Dried Herbs, Aromatics and Condiments (1967); English Potted Meats and Fish Pastes (1968); The Baking of an English Loaf (1969); Syllabubs and Fruit Fools (1969), and Green Pepper Berries (1972). Some of the content was taken from her previously published magazine articles, and some was further reused and expanded in her later books.

David's last booklet was Cooking with Le Creuset (1989) written for the French manufacturers of Le Creuset cooking ware.

=== Posthumous publications ===
In addition to Is There a Nutmeg in the House? three further books planned by David were completed and edited by Norman after the author died.

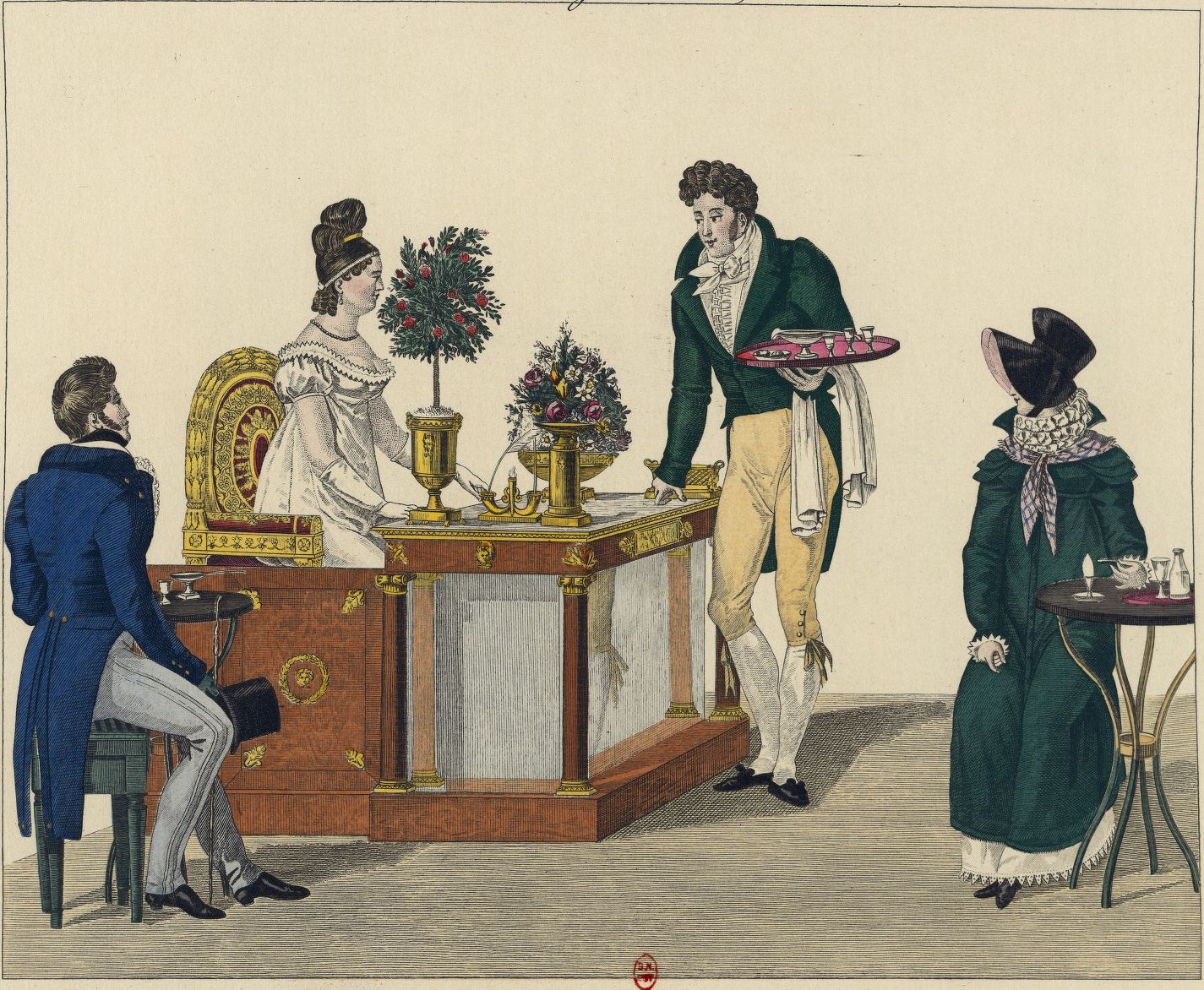
La Belle Limonadière, 1827, reproduced in Harvest of the Cold Months

Harvest of the Cold Months (1994) is subtitled "A social history of ice and ices". David had been working on it intermittently for several years before her last illnesses. The book traces the history of ice in the cuisines of Europe from mediaeval times, when it had to be brought from the mountains and kept in ice houses. The Independent's reviewer described it as "not a cookery book but an awe-inspiring feat of detective scholarship ... sumptuous and stately". Reviewing the book in The Times, Nigella Lawson wrote that although it deserved a place on the shelves of anyone who cared about food, it revealed a waning of the author's energies, and "lacks her customary, high-spirited, if fierce, readability".

South Wind Through the Kitchen (1997) was the completion of one of the projects of David's later years on which she worked with Norman: a single-volume collection of the best of her extensive writings. Norman invited chefs, writers and David's friends to choose their favourite of her articles and recipes. Many of the contributors, such as the chef Simon Hopkinson, contributed an introduction or afterword to the pieces they chose. The extracts and recipes are taken from all David's books published by 1996. There are more than 200 recipes, organised in the customary way with sections on courses and ingredients—eggs and cheese, fish and shellfish, meat, poultry and game, vegetables, pasta, pulses and grains, sauces, sweet dishes and cakes, preserves, and bread—interspersed, as in David's earlier works, with articles and essays. The title of the book comes from an essay published in 1964 and reprinted in An Omelette and a Glass of Wine, and is a reference to South Wind, the best-known novel by David's mentor Norman Douglas.

The last of the books planned by David was Elizabeth David's Christmas (2003). She and Norman had discussed such a book as early as the 1970s, but work on other projects precluded it. After David's death, Norman found when sorting out the author's papers that David had written and compiled far more material on a Christmas theme than anyone else had realised. The Christmas recipes David had most often been asked for formed the core of the book. Together with some Christmas recipes from Mediterranean Food, French Provincial Cooking, and Spices, Salt and Aromatics in the English Kitchen, and revised articles published in previous years in magazines, they were turned into a 214-page work. The chapters dealt with the social and historical side of Christmas, first courses and cold meats, soups, poultry and game, meat, vegetables and salads, sauces, pickles and chutneys, and desserts, cakes and drinks. The book reprints one of David's most quoted sentences, first printed in Vogue in 1959, and included in Is there a Nutmeg in the House in 2000: "If I had my way—and I shan't—my Christmas Day eating and drinking would consist of an omelette and cold ham and a nice bottle of wine at lunchtime, and a smoked salmon sandwich with a glass of champagne on a tray in bed in the evening."

Between 1995 and 2011 Penguin Books issued four paperback selections from David's books: I'll be with You in the Squeezing of a Lemon (1995), Peperonata and Other Italian Dishes (1996), Of Pageants and Picnics (2005), and A Taste of the Sun (2011). Two further hardback selections of David's writings were published, with Norman as editor. At Elizabeth David's Table (2010) was published to mark the 60th anniversary of David's first book. With prefatory contributions from several prominent British chefs including Hopkinson, Hugh Fearnley-Whittingstall, Rose Gray and Jamie Oliver, it comprises recipes and essays from David's previously published works. There are twelve chapters, covering the various courses of a dinner from soups to desserts, and other topics such as baking, cooking "fast and fresh", and David's descriptions of French and Italian markets. Elizabeth David on Vegetables (2013) was drawn principally from Mediterranean Food, Italian Food, French Provincial Cooking and An Omelette and a Glass of Wine. There are sections on soups; small dishes; salads; pasta; gnocchi and polenta; rice; beans and lentils; main dishes; breads; and desserts.

== Awards and honours ==
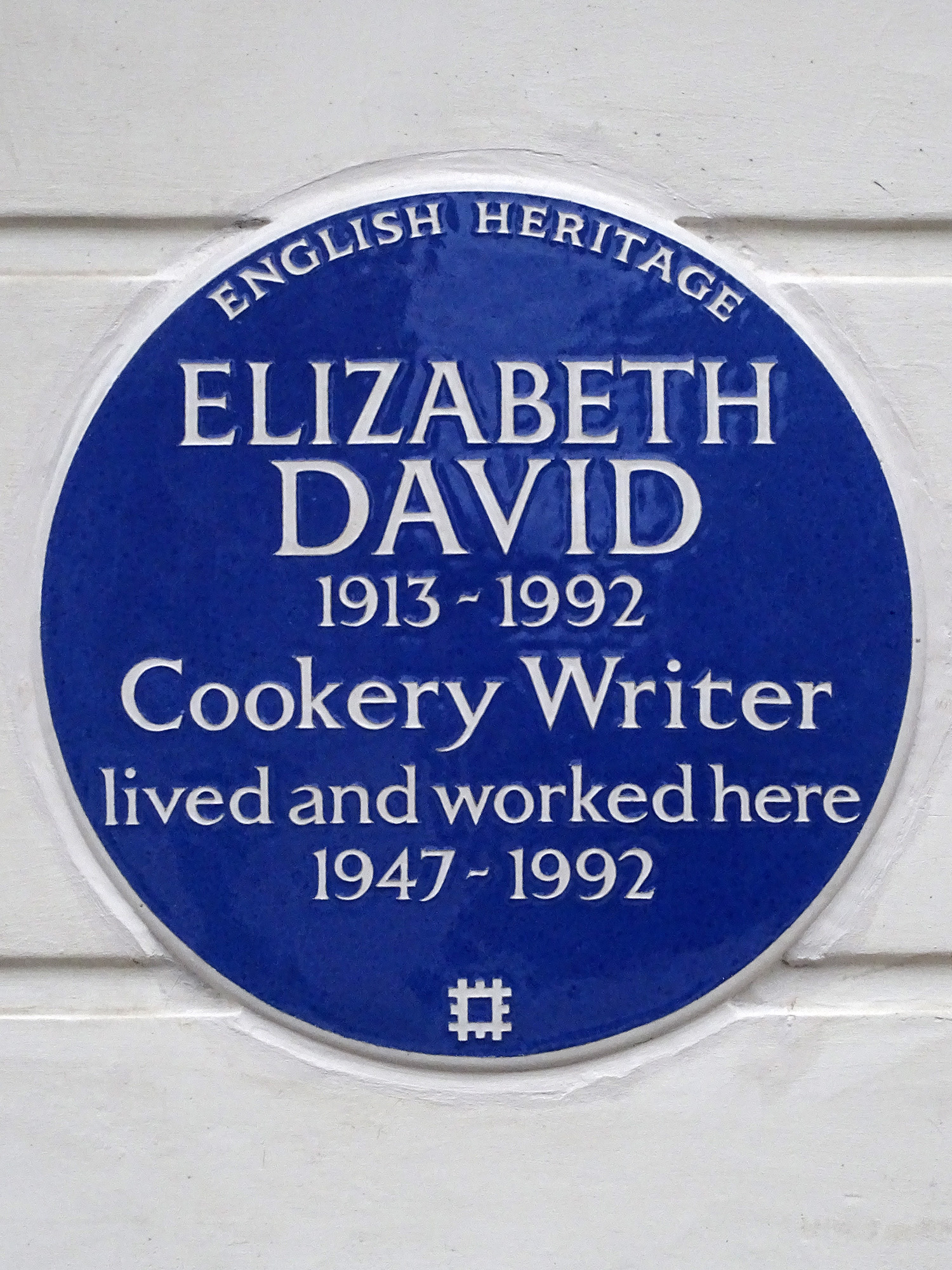
Blue plaque at 24 Halsey Street, Chelsea, where David lived for 45 years

David won the Glenfiddich Writer of the Year award in 1978 for English Bread and Yeast Cookery. She was also awarded honorary doctorates by the Universities of Essex and Bristol, and the award of a Chevalier de l'Ordre du Mérite Agricole. She was appointed Officer of the Order of the British Empire (OBE) in 1976 and promoted to Commander of the Order (CBE) in 1986. The honour that most pleased her, however, was being made a Fellow of the Royal Society of Literature in 1982 in recognition of her skills as a writer.

In 2012, to mark the Diamond Jubilee of Elizabeth II, David was chosen by BBC Radio 4 as one of the 60 Britons who have been most influential during the 60 years of the Queen's reign. In 2013 her portrait was one of a series of first-class stamps issued to celebrate the centenary of ten "Great Britons". In 2016 an English Heritage blue plaque was erected on her former home at 24 Halsey Street, Chelsea, where she had lived for 45 years; she was the first food writer to receive this form of recognition.

== Legacy ==
The obituaries for David were warm and full of praise for her work and legacy. In The Guardian, the food writer Christopher Driver called her "this century's most influential cookery writer and scholar in English", while the obituarist for The Times wrote:

Elizabeth David was the doyenne of English cookery writers. She influenced the generations who came after her, whether they, too, were intending to be culinary experts or merely taking a well-thumbed Elizabeth David Penguin from the kitchen shelf for the next day's dinner party. "Elizabeth David says ..." was the regular way of resolving how much spice—and which spices—should be added to a stew and how much garlic should be put in a dressing. At its best, her prose was as precise as her instructions, unlike that of some of her predecessors who sometimes wrapped up advice on what to do in the kitchen with impenetrable sentences. She was a pleasure to read, a stylist of true distinction. Perhaps only in Britain would she have been classified as a "food writer", too often rather a damning phrase. Elizabeth David combined a scholar's feeling for history with the traveller-aesthete's gift of conveying a sense of place.

David's writing influenced the cultural approach of the British towards food. According to the food journalist Joanna Blythman, she "performed both a cultural and gastronomic miracle in post-war Britain by introducing the nation to a vision of fresh Continental food", while the writer Rose Prince considers that David "changed for ever the way British people cook". Janet Floyd, professor of American Literature at King's College London, argues that David was not a driver of change, but came to epitomise that change. (Note: Floyd points to the increased fashion for Mediterranean travel, the influence of Terence Conran's 'rural Mediterranean style', and the increase in eating in restaurants after the end of rationing as changes that were taking place at the same time as David's works were published.) The literary historian Nicola Humble observes that "the food revolution of the post-war years would probably have happened without Elizabeth David, though in her absence it would have happened very differently".

Floyd comments that David "showed little interest in appealing to or engaging with an audience outside a social elite"; Cooper addresses the same point, although highlights a positive review of French Provincial Cooking in The Daily Worker—a newspaper that represented the Communist Party of Great Britain—as evidence that David had a broader readership than some give her credit for.

David has appeared in fictional form at least twice. In 2000 a novel, Lunch with Elizabeth David by Roger Williams, was published by Carroll & Graf, and in 2006 the BBC broadcast Elizabeth David: A Life in Recipes, a film starring Catherine McCormack as David and Greg Wise as Peter Higgins. In 1998 Lisa Chaney published a biography of David; the journalist Paul Levy found it "hasty, botched", although in The New York Times Laura Shapiro considered it "comprehensive". The following year an authorised biography, Writing at the Kitchen Table, was published by Artemis Cooper. She also wrote the entry for David in the Dictionary of National Biography in 2004 (updated in 2011). David's papers are at the Schlesinger Library at the Radcliffe Institute for Advanced Study, Harvard University.

David's passion for cookware proved influential on the style of the time. Conran acknowledges that her work "formed an important part of the learning process that led to Habitat", and the success of the Elizabeth David Ltd outlet contributed to a demand for French provincial cookware. David went to great lengths to ensure the illustrators of her books got small details right—in a draft introduction for French Provincial Cooking, she wrote: "I was anxious that such details should be put on record because some of these regional cooking pots are already becoming very hard to find in France, so that in some sense Juliet Renny's drawings constitute a little historical record in their own right."

David's ongoing campaign against the mass-production and standardisation of food was ahead of her time, although Chaney describes her thoughts as "instinctive and unarticulated". One of David's passions, the premise of buying local produce in season and preparing it simply, is a message continued by Stein, Slater and Fearnley-Whittingstall.

Fellow cooks and chefs have acknowledged David's influence on their own and their colleagues' works; her contemporary Jane Grigson wrote in 1967 "Nobody can produce a cookery book these days without a deep appreciation of Elizabeth David's work." Grigson later wrote:

Basil was no more than the name of bachelor uncles, courgette was printed in italics as an alien word, and few of us knew how to eat spaghetti or pick a globe artichoke to pieces. ... Then came Elizabeth David like sunshine, writing with brief elegance about good food, that is, about food well contrived, well cooked. She made us understand that we could do better with what we had.

Rick Stein, a more recent chef, says that David was such an influence on his early work that he used one of Minton's illustrations from A Book of Mediterranean Food on his menus when he first opened a restaurant. Others, including Nigel Slater, Gordon Ramsay, Jamie Oliver, Prue Leith and Clarissa Dickson Wright, have been influenced by David; Dickson Wright said that David "taught me that food is more than cooking; it is poetry and passion as well. She also taught me never to settle for culinary second-best". Norman quotes Leith as being quite shocked when she asked students at a catering college how many of them had read David's books, and not a single one raised a hand. "But the books do sell—I see the royalty statements—and you see her influence in the cooking of Jeremy Lee, Shaun Hill and Rowley Leigh".

David's influence travelled further afield than Britain, and Marian Burros, in The New York Times wrote in 1992 that "Dozens of the young chefs who have brought glory to American cooking over the last two decades are indebted to Mrs David." (Note: Burros, in the same paper, also called David "a food writer credited with almost single-handedly changing the cooking in her native England".) The same year, the journalist Susan Parsons wrote in The Canberra Times that "Every leading Australian chef over the age of 40 pays tribute to Elizabeth David as a major influence on their approach to food". More modern Australian cooks, such as Kylie Kwong, have also cited David as a continuing influence on their work.

Michael Bateman, the food critic for The Independent, considered that David "will be remembered as a far greater influence on English food than Mrs Beeton"; the writer Auberon Waugh wrote that if asked to name the woman who had brought about the greatest improvement in English life in the 20th century, "my vote would go to Elizabeth David." David's biographer Cooper concludes her Oxford Dictionary of National Biography article thus:

David was the best writer on food and drink this country has ever produced. When she began writing in the 1950s, the British scarcely noticed what was on their plates at all, which was perhaps just as well. Her books and articles persuaded her readers that food was one of life's great pleasures, and that cooking should not be a drudgery but an exciting and creative act. In doing so she inspired a whole generation not only to cook, but to think about food in an entirely different way.

== Notes, references and sources ==
=== Sources ===
==== Cited works by Elizabeth David ====
- Elizabeth David Classics. London: Grub Street. 1999 [1980]. ISBN 978-1-902304-27-4. Comprising:
  - (pp. 1–196) A Book of Mediterranean Food (1950, rev. 1962)
  - (pp. 197–395) French Country Cooking (1951, rev. 1958)
  - (pp. 397–640) Summer Cooking (1955, rev. 1965).
- Italian Food. London: Penguin. 1987 [1954]. ISBN 978-0-14-046841-0.
- French Provincial Cooking. London: Penguin. 1979 [1960]. ISBN 978-0-14-046099-5.
- Spices, Salt and Aromatics in the English Kitchen. Harmondsworth: Penguin. 1970. ISBN 978-0-14-046163-3.
- English Bread and Yeast Cookery. Harmondsworth: Penguin. 1977. ISBN 978-0-14-046299-9.
- Harvest of the Cold Months: The Social History of Ice and Ices. London: Michael Joseph. 1994. ISBN 978-0-7181-3703-8.
- I'll be with You in the Squeezing of a Lemon. London: Penguin. 1995. ISBN 978-0-14-600020-1.
- Peperonata and Other Italian Dishes. London: Penguin. 1996. ISBN 978-0-14-600140-6.
- Jill Norman, ed. (1986) [1984]. An Omelette and a Glass of Wine. London: Penguin. ISBN 978-0-14-046721-5.
- South Wind Through the Kitchen: The Best of Elizabeth David. London: Michael Joseph. 1997. ISBN 978-0-7181-4168-4.
- Jill Norman, ed. (2001) [2000]. Is There a Nutmeg in the House?. London: Penguin. ISBN 978-0-14-029290-9.
- Elizabeth David's Christmas. London: Michael Joseph. 2003. ISBN 978-0-7181-4670-2.

==== Other cited works ====
- Barnes, Julian (2002). Something to Declare. London: Picador. ISBN 978-0-330-48916-4.
- Chaney, Lisa (1998). Elizabeth David. London: Macmillan. ISBN 978-0-333-65930-4.
- Claiborne, Craig (1973). A Kitchen Primer. Harmondsworth: Penguin. ISBN 978-0-14-046172-5.
- Clarke, Peter (2004). Hope and Glory: Britain 1900–2000. London: Penguin. ISBN 978-0-1410-1175-2.
- Cooper, Artemis (1999). Writing at the Kitchen Table—The Authorized Biography of Elizabeth David. London: Michael Joseph. ISBN 978-0-7181-4224-7.
- Cowan, Gibson (1938). Loud Report. London: Michael Joseph. OCLC 560039703.
- Cullen, Pamela V. (2006). A Stranger in Blood: The Case Files on Dr John Bodkin Adams. Harmondsworth: Penguin. ISBN 978-1-904027-19-5.
- Floyd, Janet; Forster, Laurel (2017). The Recipe Reader: Narratives—Contexts—Traditions. Abingdon, Oxon: Routledge. ISBN 978-1-351-88318-4.
- Frost, Warwick; Laing, Jennifer; Best, Gary; William, Kim; Strickland, Paul; Lade, Clare (2016). Gastronomy, Tourism and the Media. Bristol: Channel View Publications. ISBN 978-1-8454-1573-0.
- Grigson, Jane (2008) [1967]. Charcuterie and French Pork Cookery. London: Grub Street Cookery. ISBN 978-1-9081-1793-9.
- Grigson, Jane (1973). Good Things. London: Michael Joseph. ISBN 978-0-14-046191-6.
- Humble, Nicola (2006). Culinary Pleasures: Cook Books and the Transformation of British Food. London: Faber & Faber. ISBN 978-0-5712-2871-3.
- Kwong, Kylie (2006). Heart and Soul. Melbourne: Viking. ISBN 978-1-9209-8922-4.
- Mitford, Nancy (1973) [1956]. Noblesse Oblige: An Enquiry into the Identifiable Characteristics of the English Aristocracy. London: Hamish Hamilton. ISBN 978-0-241-02343-3.
- Panayi, Panikos (2010) [2008]. Spicing Up Britain. London: Reaktion Books. ISBN 978-1-86189-373-4.
- Stein, Rick (2013). Under a Mackerel Sky. London: Random House. ISBN 978-0-0919-5701-8.
- Tomasevich, Jozo (1975). War and Revolution in Yugoslavia 1941–1945. Stanford: Stanford University Press. ISBN 978-0-8047-0857-9.
- Williams, Maggie (June 1994). "Elizabeth David". The Book and Magazine Collector (123): 56–63.
- Williams, Roger (1999). Lunch With Elizabeth David. London: Little, Brown. ISBN 978-0-316-85054-4.
- Zweiniger-Bargielowska, Ina (2000). Austerity in Britain: Rationing, Controls, and Consumption, 1939–1955. Oxford: Oxford University Press. ISBN 978-0-19-154224-4.

=== Further reading: works by David not cited above ===
- The Use of Wine in Fine Cooking. London: Saccone and Speed. 1950. OCLC 315839710.
- The Use of Wine in Italian Cooking. London: Saccone and Speed. 1952. OCLC 25461747.
- Dried Herbs, Aromatics and Condiments. London: Kitchen Utensils. 1967. OCLC 769267360.
- English Potted Meats and Fish Pates. London: Kitchen Utensils. 1968. ISBN 978-0-901794-01-7.
- Syllabubs and Fruit Fools. London: Kitchen Utensils. 1969. OCLC 928158148.
- The Baking of an English Loaf. London: Kitchen Utensils. 1969. ISBN 978-0-901794-00-0.
- Cooking with Le Creuset. London: E D Clarbat. 1969. OCLC 86055309.
- Of Pageants and Picnics. London: Penguin. 2005. ISBN 978-0-14-102259-8.
- At Elizabeth David's Table: Her Very Best Everyday Recipes. London: Michael Joseph. 2010. ISBN 978-0-7181-5475-2.
- A Taste of the Sun. London: Penguin. 2011. ISBN 978-0-14-196598-7.
- Elizabeth David on Vegetables. London: Quadrille. 2013. ISBN 978-1-84949-268-3.
