= Hilda Leyel =

British herbalist and author

- Born: Hilda Wauton; 6 December 1880; London, United Kingdom
- Died: 15 April 1957 (age 77); London, United Kingdom
- Occupation: Author

Hilda Leyel (née Wauton; 6 December 1880 – 15 April 1957), who wrote under the name Mrs. C. F. Leyel, was an expert on herbalism and founded the Society of Herbalists (later the Herb Society) in England in 1927, as well as a chain of herbalist stores called the Culpeper House herb shops.

Leyel was the author of a book on herbalism, called Elixirs of Life, among other works on the subject, as well as the cookery book The Gentle Art of Cookery. She was a fellow of the Royal Institution and an officer of the Académie Française.

== Early life and education ==
Leyel was born in London and educated at Uppingham School, a fee-charging independent school for boys where her father Edward Wauton was a teacher. While still young, she developed a precocious interest in herbs and flowers and after leaving school studied medicine. She worked briefly with Frank Benson, who was an actor-manager.

== Later career and personal life ==
In 1900, at the age of 19, she married Carl Frederick Leyel, a theatrical manager five years her senior. The couple had two sons. They were said to be unhappy and divorced in 1922. (Carl remarried to Nancy Mary Manfield the following year, but it was a short marriage as he was thrown from a horse in 1925 and died as a result of the injuries.)

Carl and Hilda began their married life in a flat in Lincoln's Inn, London's legal district. There she began to entertain, developing an interest in food and wine. The influential friends she made at this point in her life rallied to her support in 1922 when she was prosecuted for running the Golden Ballot, a charity which raised money for ex-servicemen and various hospitals. Her acquittal helped to establish the legality of such ballots. Much of the money Hilda raised was used to build and maintain the Westfield Memorial Village, in Lancaster, which provided homes for disabled veterans of World War 1, as described in the Lancashire Evening Post of 24th May, 2019 (available online).

She was elected a life governor of St Mary's, the West London, and the Royal National Orthopaedic hospitals.

== Herbalism ==
Leyel became very interested in herbalism, and with her academic training in botany, she studied the work of the herbalist Nicholas Culpeper, among others. She wrote The Magic of Herbs in 1926, and in 1927 she opened Culpeper House on Baker Street, a shop selling herbal medicines, food and cosmetics; these proved very successful, especially with women. She founded the Society of Herbalists, a non-profit organization, for the study and application of herbalism. The society later became the Herb Society, a registered educational charity.

In 1941, the society's existence was threatened by the Pharmacy and Medicines Bill, which would have destroyed the work of the herbalist in England. Influential friends rallied to Leyel's support, and the bill was modified to enable patients to obtain treatment upon joining the society. She also joined Sir Albert Howard in his campaign for compost versus synthetic fertilizers, and those working for pure water and food.

== Cookery ==
Leyel was a proponent of a simpler style of cooking, turning away from the Victorian 'high class' cookery and favouring seasonal and local ingredients.

Her influence was acknowledged by Elizabeth David, who in an article for The Spectator in July 1963 wrote 'I wonder if I would ever have learned to cook at all had I been given a routine Mrs Beeton [i.e. Mrs. Beeton's Book of Household Management] to learn from instead of the romantic Mrs Leyel, with her rather wild and imagination-catching recipes'. Although Elizabeth David praised Leyel's writing, which she described as "fresh and alluring", she questioned whether the recipes would work, describing them as "sketchy in the extreme" and "another manifestation of the English love affair with Eastern food and Arabian Nights Ingredients".

== Works ==
In 1931, Leyel edited Maud Grieve's A Modern Herbal in two volumes. She herself wrote a long series of works on herbs, including Herbal Delights (1937), Compassionate Herbs (1946), Elixirs of Life (1948), Hearts-Ease (1949), Green Medicine (1952), and Cinquefoil (1957), as well as others on cooking including Picnics for Motorists (1936).

Picnic for Motorists (1936) evokes, according to food historian Polly Russell, 'the romance of empty roads, endless summers and carefully packed hampers' Walter Levy claims that "despite its title Picnic for Motorists is often unpicknicky", that is, unsuitable for an excursion or outdoor eating. The book lists 60 picnic menus, the first of which "suggests melon, cold chicken pie, ham and pea salad, chocolate mousse and cream cheese and crescent rolls". Leyel is said by Russell to have "eclectic" tastes as the book has recipes for "Indian pie with rice, German pie and Chinese orange salad".

== Honors and retirement ==
Leyel was a fellow of the Royal Institution, and an officer of l'Académie française. She received the Palmes Académiques of France in 1924, for her work in supporting disabled service personnel and the work she did with the Society of Herbalists.

She died in the Harley Street Nursing Home at 35 Weymouth Street in London on 15 April 1957.

== Books ==
Leyal wrote several books as C. F. Leyal.

- Herbal Delights, Botanical Information and Recipes
- The Magic of Herbs
- The Truth About Herbs
- Jams
- The magic of herbs: A modern book of secrets
