= Glenfiddich Food and Drink Awards =

Former Scottish food writing awards

The Glenfiddich Food and Drink Awards were intended to recognize achievements in writing, publishing and broadcasting on the subjects of food and drink. The awards had been sponsored since 1972 by William Grant & Sons, a family-owned Scottish distiller that produces Glenfiddich, a Speyside single malt Scotch whisky.

In total 12 awards were made annually.

In 2008, Glenfiddich discontinued the Food and Drink Awards, reviewing their "strategy, scope and potential application in some of Glenfiddich’s key markets outside the UK".

== See also ==
- Glenfiddich Spirit of Scotland Awards
