= Hannah Glasse =

English cookery writer (1708–1770)

- Born: Hannah Allgood; March 1708; London, England
- Died: 1 September 1770 (aged 62); London, England
- Occupation: Cookery writer
- Known for: The Art of Cookery Made Plain and Easy (1747)
- Relatives: Lancelot Allgood (half-brother)

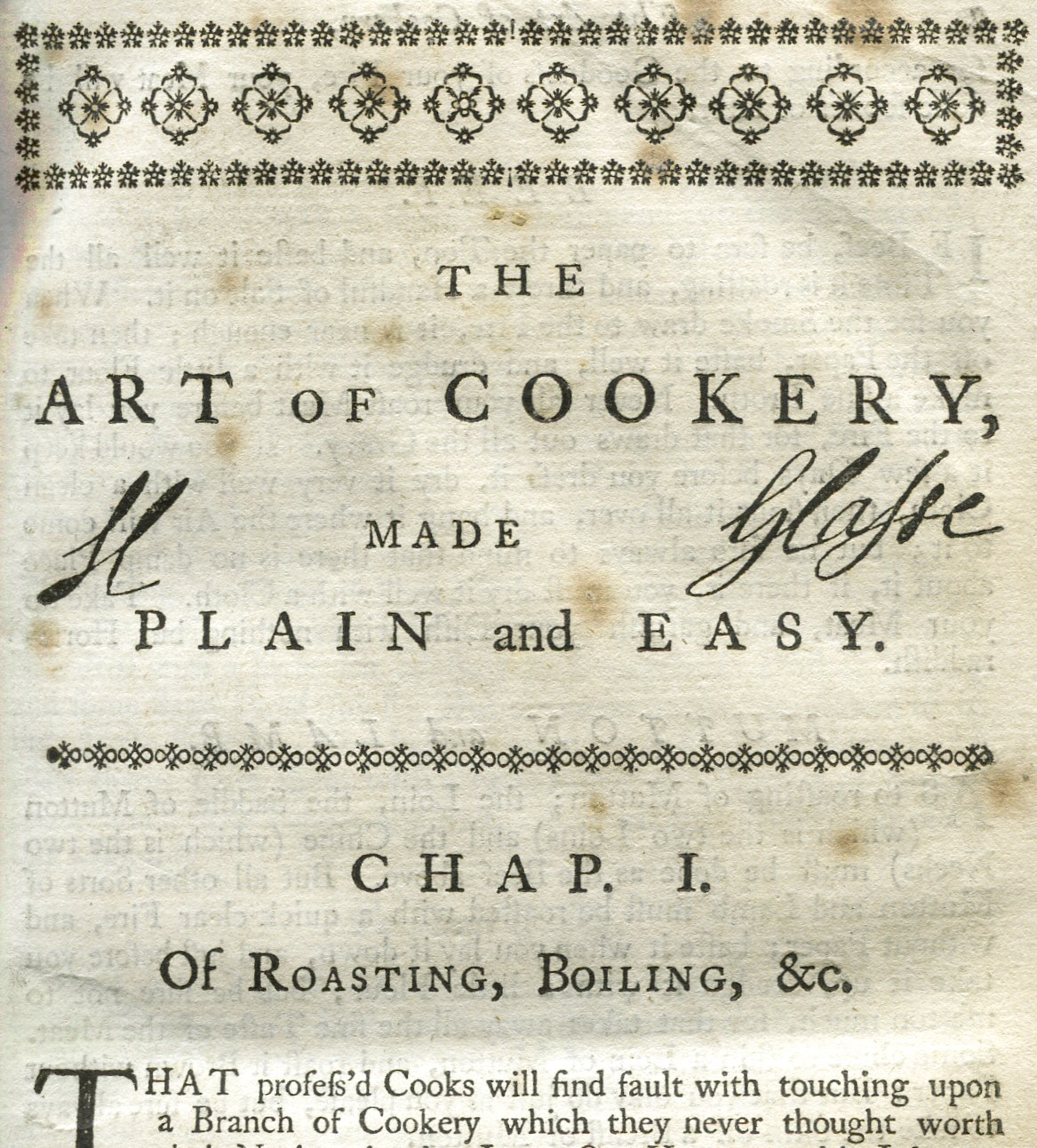
Glasse's signature at the top of the first chapter of her book, The Art of Cookery Made Plain and Easy, 6th Edition, 1758

Hannah Glasse (née Allgood; March 1708 – 1 September 1770) was an English cookery writer. Her first book, The Art of Cookery Made Plain and Easy, published in 1747, became the best-selling recipe book that century. It was reprinted within its first year of publication, appeared in 20 editions in the 18th century, and continued to be published until well into the 19th century. She later wrote The Servants' Directory (1760) and The Compleat Confectioner, which was probably published in 1760; neither book was as commercially successful as her first.

Glasse was born in London to a Northumberland landowner and his mistress. After the relationship ended, Glasse was brought up in her father's family. When she was 16 she eloped with a 30-year-old Irish subaltern then on half-pay and lived in Essex, working on the estate of the Earls of Donegall. The couple struggled financially and, with the aim of raising money, Glasse wrote The Art of Cookery. She copied extensively from other cookery books, around a third of the recipes having been published elsewhere. Among her original recipes are the first known curry recipe written in English, as well as three recipes for pilau, an early reference to vanilla in English cuisine, the first recorded use of jelly in trifle, and an early recipe for ice cream. She was also the first to use the term "Yorkshire pudding" in print.

Glasse became a dressmaker in Covent Garden—where her clients included Princess Augusta, the Princess of Wales—but she ran up excessive debts. She was imprisoned for bankruptcy and was forced to sell the copyright of The Art of Cookery. Much of Glasse's later life is unrecorded; information about her identity was lost until uncovered in 1938 by the historian Madeleine Hope Dodds. Other authors plagiarised Glasse's writing and pirated copies became common, particularly in the United States. The Art of Cookery has been admired by English cooks in the second part of the 20th century, and influenced many of them, including Elizabeth David, Fanny Cradock and Clarissa Dickson Wright.

== Biography ==
=== Early life ===
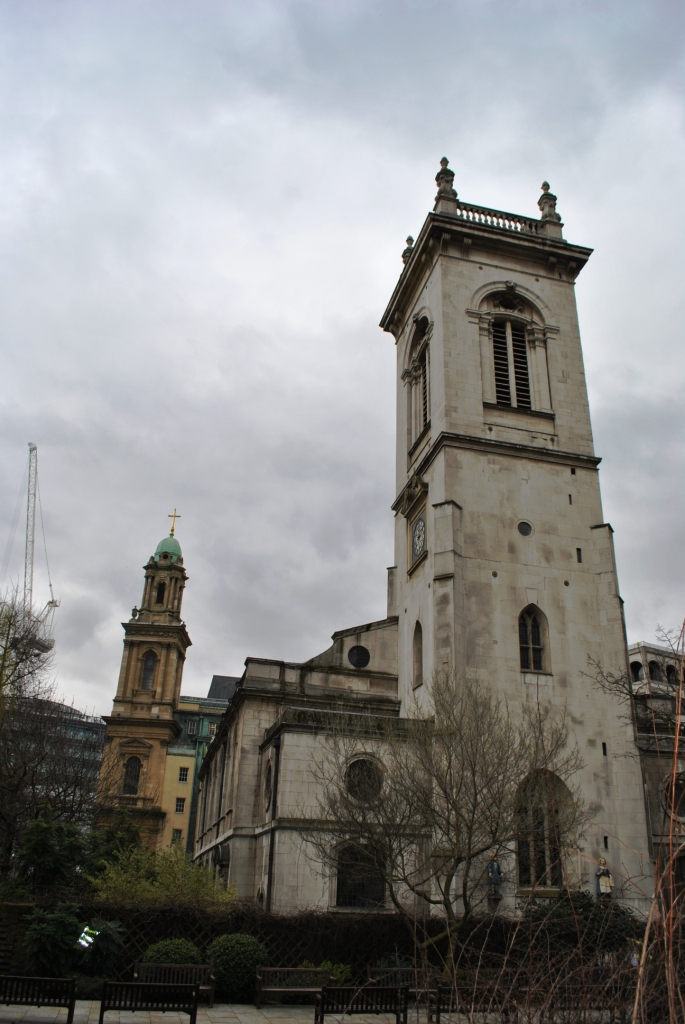
St Andrews, Holborn, where Glasse was christened

Glasse was born Hannah Allgood at Greville Street, Hatton Garden, London, to Isaac Allgood and his mistress, Hannah Reynolds. Isaac, a landowner and coal-mine owner, was from a well-known, respected family from Nunwick Hall, Hexham, Northumberland; he was married to Hannah née Clark, the daughter of Isaac of London, a vintner. Glasse was christened on 24 March 1708 at St Andrews, Holborn, London. Allgood and Reynolds had two other children, both of whom died young. Allgood and his wife also had a child, Lancelot, born three years after Glasse. (Note: Lancelot became the high sheriff and Tory MP and the High Sheriff of Northumberland; he was later knighted.)

Allgood took Reynolds and the young Hannah back to Hexham to live, and she was brought up with his other children, but according to A. H. T. Robb-Smith in the Oxford Dictionary of National Biography, Reynolds was "banished from Hexham"; no reason is recorded. By 1713, Allgood and Reynolds were again living together back in London. The following year, while drunk, Allgood signed papers transferring all his property to Reynolds. Once he realised the magnitude of his mistake, the couple separated. The Allgood family tried to have the property returned, which they managed in 1740, providing Glasse with an annual income and a sum of capital. She did not have a good relationship with her mother, who had little input into her daughter's upbringing; Glasse described her in correspondence as a "wicked wretch!"

Soon after the death of his wife in 1724, Allgood fell ill and Glasse was sent to live with her grandmother. Although Glasse was banned from attending social events by her grandmother, she began a relationship with an older man: John Glasse. He was a 30-year-old Irish subaltern, then on half-pay, who had previously been employed by Lord Polwarth; John was a widower. On 4 August 1724 the couple were secretly married by special licence. Her family found out about the marriage a month later, when she moved out of her grandmother's house and in with her husband in Piccadilly. Although her family were angered by the relationship, they soon resumed cordial dealings, and continued a warm and friendly correspondence. Hannah's first letter to her grandmother apologised for the secrecy surrounding her elopement, but did not express regret for getting married. "I am sorry at what I have done, but only the manner of it".

By 1728 the Glasses were living in New Hall, Broomfield, Essex, the home of the 4th Earl of Donegall; John Glasse was probably working as an estate steward. They had their first child while living at New Hall. The Glasses moved back to London in November 1734 and lodged there for four years before moving to Greville Street, near Hatton Garden. Over the coming years Glasse gave birth to ten children, five of whom died young. She considered education important and sent her daughters to good local schools and her sons to Eton and Westminster. The couple struggled constantly with finances, and in 1744 Glasse tried to sell Daffy's Elixir, a patent medicine; the project did not take off. She then decided to write a cookery book.

=== The Art of Cookery ===
Frontispieces from two editions of The Art of Cookery Made Plain and Easy

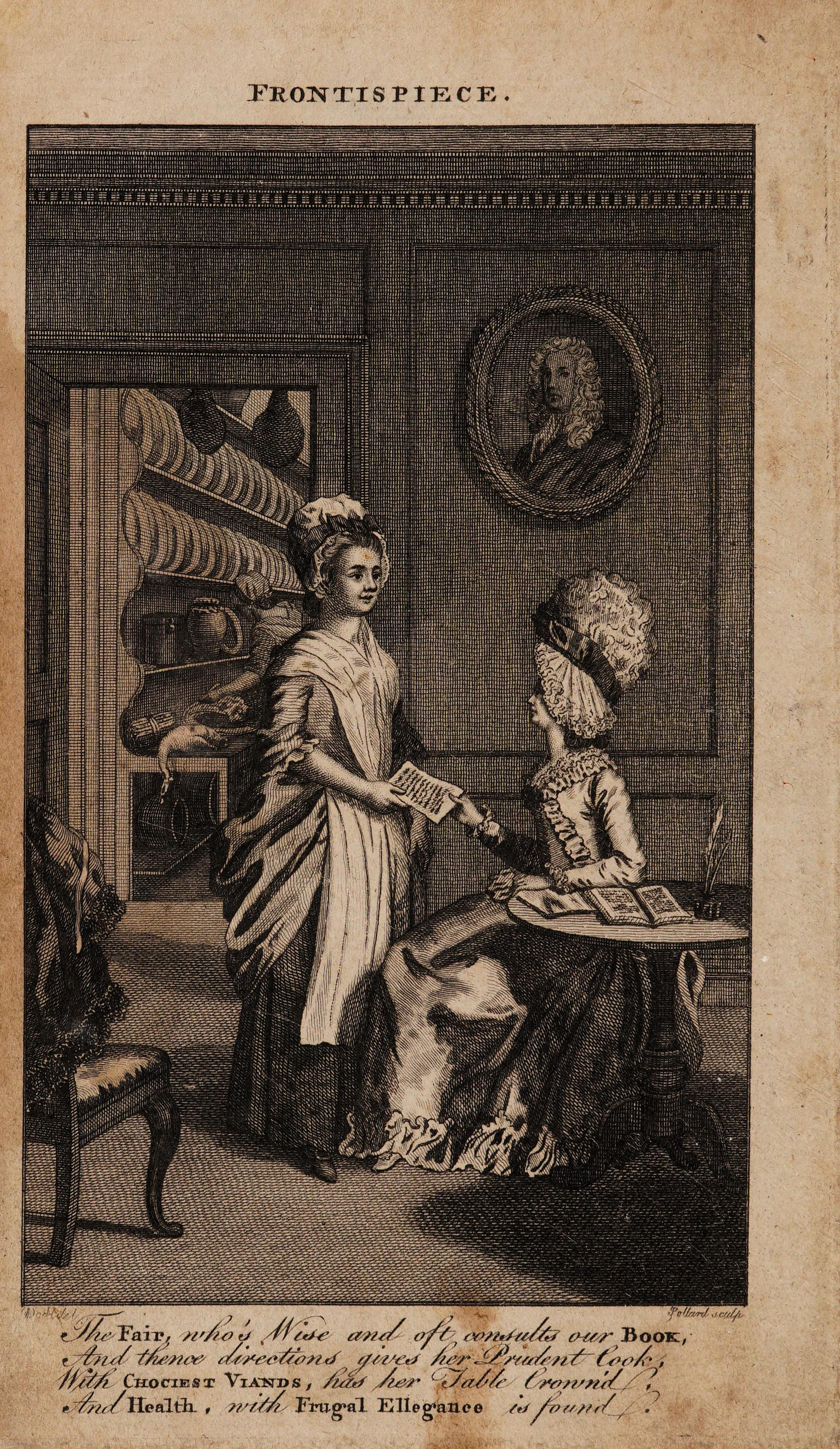
The 1770 edition

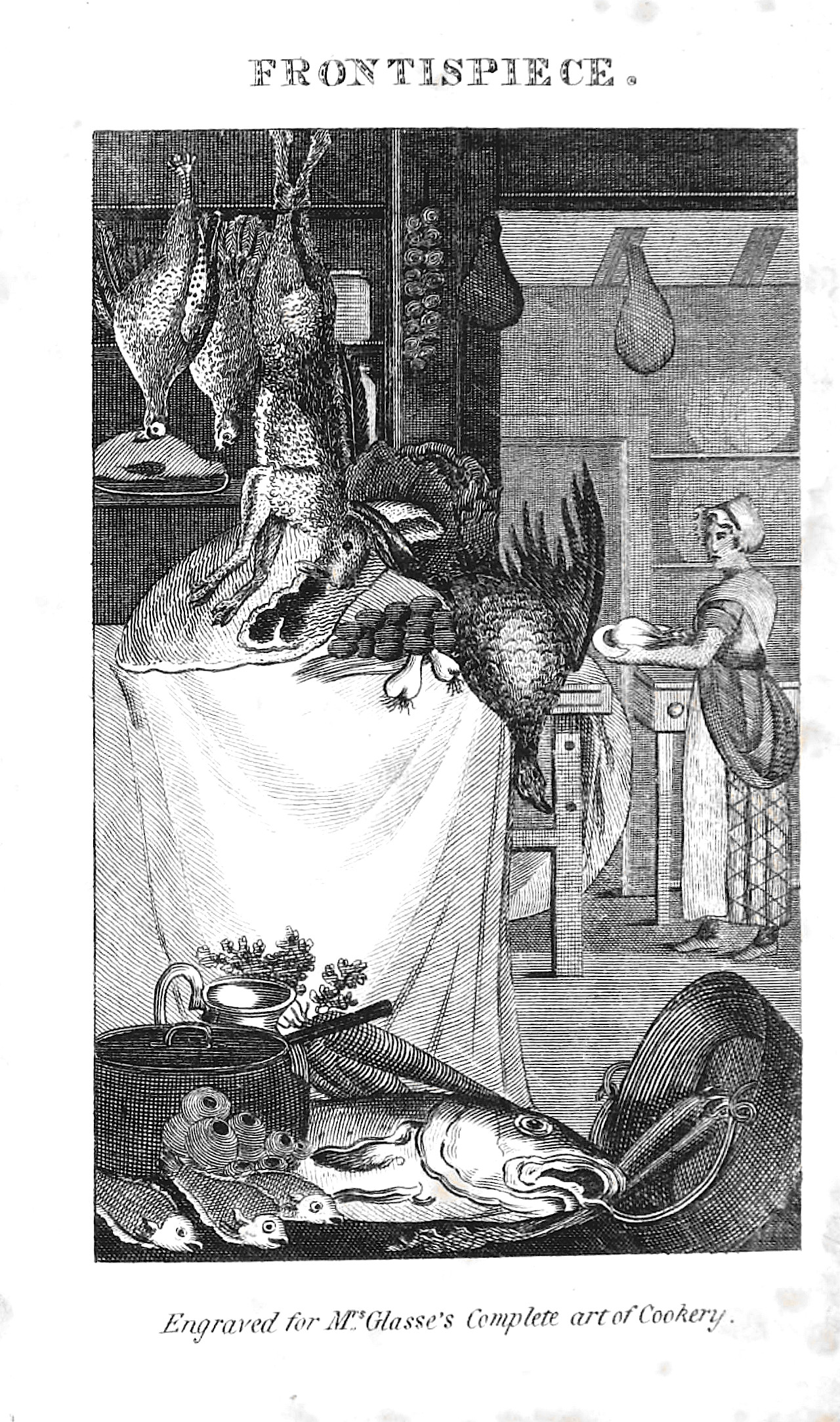
The 1828 edition

In a letter dated January 1746 Glasse wrote "My book goes on very well and everybody is pleased with it, it is now in the press". The Art of Cookery Made Plain and Easy was printed the following year and sold at "Mrs. Ashburn's, a China Shop, the corner of Fleet-Ditch", according to the title page. (Note: Some sources give the date of first publication as 1746.) The book was available bound for 5 shillings, or plainly stitched for 3 shillings. As was the practice for publishers at the time, Glasse provided the names of subscribers—those who had pre-paid for a copy—who were listed inside the work. The first edition listed 202 subscribers; that number increased for the second and third editions. On the title page Glasse writes that the book "far exceeds any Thing of the Kind ever yet published". In the introduction she states "I believe I have attempted a Branch of Cookery which Nobody has yet thought worth their while to write upon", which, she explains, is to write a book aimed at the domestic staff of a household. As such, she apologises to readers, "If I have not wrote in the high, polite Stile, I hope I shall be forgiven; for my Intention is to instruct the lower Sort, and therefore must treat them in their own Way".

Glasse extensively used other sources during the writing: of the 972 recipes in the first edition, 342 of them had been copied or adapted from other works. This plagiarism was typical of the time as, under the Statute of Anne—the 1709 act of parliament dealing with copyright protection—recipes were not safeguarded against copyright infringement. The chapter on cream was taken in full from Eliza Smith's 1727 work, The Compleat Housewife, and, in the meat section, 17 consecutive recipes were copied from The Whole Duty of a Woman, although Glasse had rewritten the scant instructions intended for experienced cooks into more complete instructions for the less proficient.

A second edition of The Art of Cookery Made Plain and Easy appeared before the year was out, and nine further versions were published by 1765. The early editions of the book did not reveal its authorship, using the vague cover "By a Lady"; it was not until the fourth imprint, published in 1751, that Glasse's name appeared on the title page. The absence of an author's name permitted the erroneous claim that it was written by John Hill; in James Boswell's Life of Johnson, Boswell recounts a dinner with Samuel Johnson and the publisher, Charles Dilly. Dilly stated that "Mrs. Glasse's Cookery, which is the best, was written by Dr Hill. Half the trade know this." Johnson was doubtful of the connection because of confusion in the book between saltpetre and sal prunella, a mistake Hill would not have made. Despite this, Johnson thought it was a male writer, and said "Women can spin very well; but they cannot make a good book of cookery".

=== Later years ===
The same year in which the first edition was published, John Glasse died. He was buried at St Mary's Church, Broomfield, on 21 June 1747. That year, Glasse set herself up as a "habit maker" or dressmaker in Tavistock Street, Covent Garden, in partnership with her eldest daughter, Margaret. The fourth edition of her book included a full-page advertisement for her shop, which said she was the "habit maker to Her Royal Highness the Princess of Wales", Princess Augusta. When her half-brother Lancelot came to stay with her, he wrote:

Hannah has so many coaches at her door that, to judge from appearances, she must succeed in her business ... she has great visitors with her, no less than the Prince and Princess of Wales, to see her masquerade dresses.

Glasse was not successful in her line of business and, after borrowing heavily, she was declared bankrupt in May 1754 with debts of £10,000. (Note: £10,000 in 1754 equates to around £1,845,000 in 2025, according to calculations based on the Consumer Price Index measure of inflation.) Among the assets sold off to pay her debts was the copyright of The Art of Cookery Made Plain and Easy, which went to Andrew Miller and a conger of booksellers, and 3,000 copies of the fifth edition; the syndicate held the rights for the next fifty years. It is not clear what subsequent involvement Glasse had in any of the printings after the fifth. (Note: The stock from the shop was not sold to pay the debts: it was held in Margaret's name.) She was issued with a certificate of conformity, which marked the end of her bankruptcy, in January 1755.

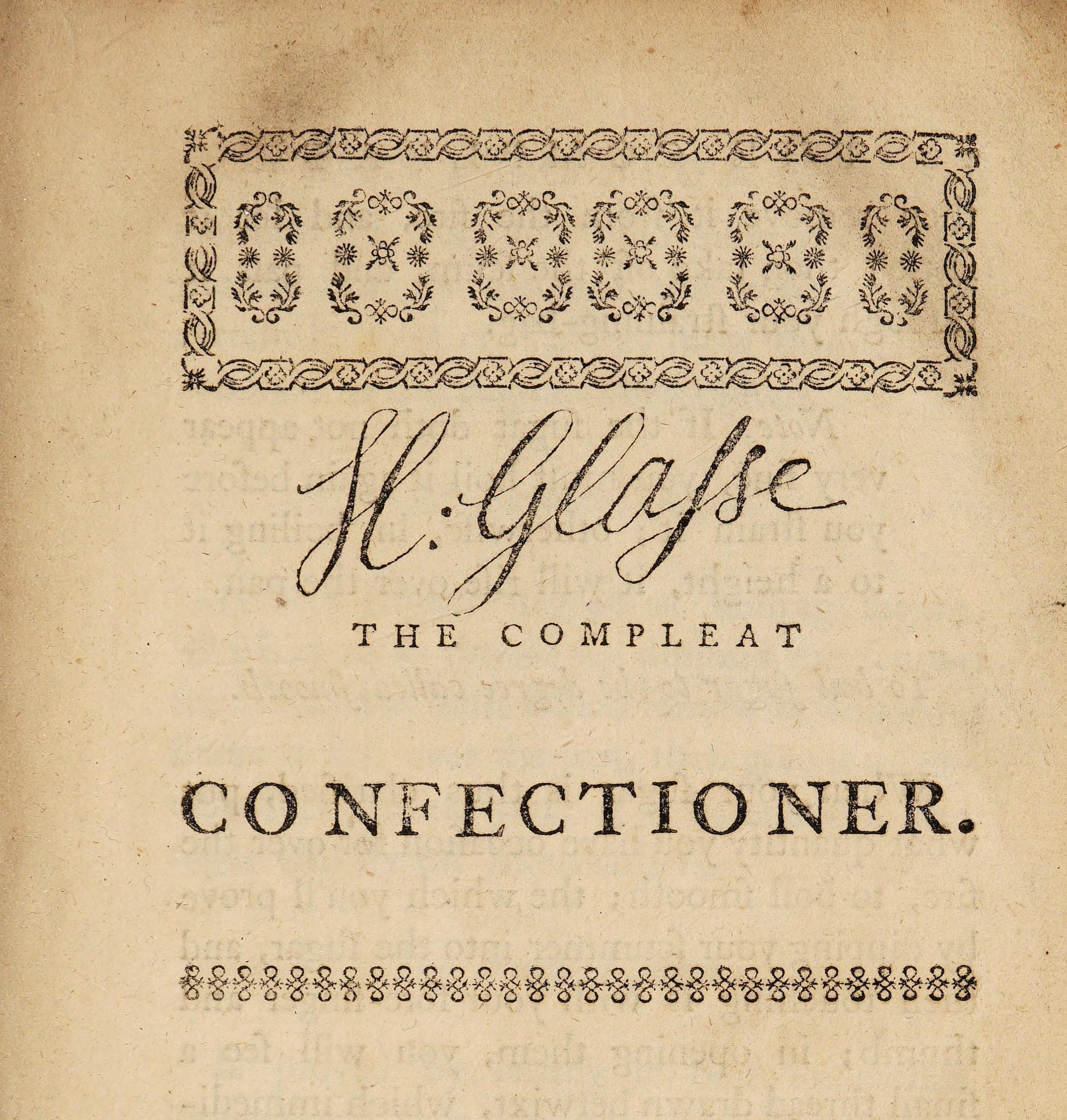
Section of the first page of The Compleat Confectioner (1772 edition)

In 1754 the cookery book Professed Cookery: containing boiling, roasting, pastry, preserving, potting, pickling, made-wines, gellies, and part of confectionaries was published by Ann Cook. The book contained what was titled "An Essay upon the Lady's Art of Cookery", which was an attack on Glasse and The Art of Cookery, which the historian Madeleine Hope Dodds described as a "violent onslaught" and the historian Gilly Lehman called "appalling doggerel"; the social historian Jennifer Stead assessed much of the culinary criticism as warranted. Dodds established that Cook had been in a feud with Lancelot Allgood and used the book to gain a measure of revenge against him. (Note: Allgood had accused Cook's husband—the landlord of a local pub—of cheating him over some wine. Cook had debts he could not pay and was sent to a debtors' prison; Ann Cook blamed Allgood for the family's troubles.)

Glasse continued to live at her Tavistock Street home until 1757, but her financial troubles continued and she was imprisoned as a debtor at Marshalsea gaol in June that year before being transferred to Fleet Prison a month later. By December she had been released and registered three shares in The Servants' Directory, a work she was writing on how to manage a household; (Note: The full title of the work was The Servant's Directory: Or House-keeper's Companion: Wherein the Duties of the Chamber-Maid, Nursery-Maid, House-Maid, Landery-Maid, Scullion, Or Under-Cook, Are Fully and Distinctly Explained. To which is Annexed a Diary, Or House-keeper's Pocket-book for the Whole Year. With Directions for Keeping Accounts with Tradesmen, and Many Other Particulars, Fit to be Known by the Mistress of a Family. By H. Glass, Author of The Art of Cookery Made Plain and Easy.) it included several blank pages at the end for recording kitchen accounts. The work was published in 1760, but was not commercially successful. Glasse also wrote The Compleat Confectioner, which was published undated, but probably in 1760. (Note: 1762 is another year given for the publication.) As she had with her first book, Glasse plagiarised the work of others for this new work, particularly from Edwards Lambert's 1744 work The Art of Confectionery, but also from Smith's Compleat Housewife and The Family Magazine (1741). Glasse's work contained the essentials of sweet-, cake- and ices-making, including how to boil sugar to the required stages, making custards and syllabubs, preserving and distilled drinks.

There are no records that relate to Glasse's final ten years. In 1770 The Newcastle Courant announced "Last week died in London, Mrs Glasse, only sister to Sir Lancelot Allgood, of Nunwick, in Northumberland", referring to her death on 1 September.

== Books ==
The Art of Cookery Made Plain and Easy consists mainly of English recipes, and is aimed at providing good, affordable food, and the television cook Clarissa Dickson Wright saw the work as "a masterly summary" of English cuisine of well-to-do households in the mid-18th century. Glasse saw that household education for young ladies no longer included confectionery and grand desserts, and many of the recipes in The Compleat Confectioner move away from the banqueting dishes of the 17th century to new-style desserts of the 18th and 19th. In The Art of Cookery she shows signs of a modern approach to cooking with more focus on savoury dishes—which had a French influence—rather than the more prestigious but dated sweet dishes that had been favoured in the 17th century. In The Compleat Confectioner she writes:

every young lady ought to know both how to make all kind of confectionary, and dress out a desert; in former days, it was look'd on as a great perfection in a young lady to understand all these things, if it was only to give directions to her servants[.]

Glasse was not averse to criticising the French or their cooking, and her introduction states:

A Frenchman in his own country will dress a fine dinner of twenty dishes, and all genteel and pretty, for the expence he will put an English lord to for dressing one dish. ... I have heard of a cook that used six pounds of butter to fry twelve eggs; when every body knows ... that half a pound is full enough, or more than need be used: but then it would not be French. So much is the blind folly of this age, that they would rather be imposed on by a French booby, than give encouragement to a good English cook!

Despite Glasse's overtly hostile approach to French cuisine, there is, Stead detects, a "love-hate relationship with French cookery, scorn coupled with sneaking admiration". In The Art of Cookery, Glasse introduced a chapter of eight recipes—all detailed and intricate, and all French in origin—with the advice "Read this chapter and you will find how expensive a French cook's sauce is". The first recipe, "The French way of dressing partridges" ends with her comment "This dish I do not recommend; for I think it an odd jumble of trash ... but such receipts as this, is what you have in most books of cookery yet printed." Henry Notaker, in his history of cookery books, observes that Glasse has included what she sees to be a poor recipe, only because her readers would miss it otherwise. Throughout the book she introduced recipes that were French in origin, although these were often anglicised to remove the heavily flavoured sauces from meat dishes. With each new publication of the book, the number of non-English recipes rose, with additions from German, Dutch, Indian, Italian, West Indian and American cuisines. (Note: Additions include "sour crout", "Chickens and turkies dressed after the Dutch way", "fricasey of calves feet and chaldron, after the Italian way", additional recipes for curry and pilau, "turtle dressed the West India way", "mutton kebobbed", "Carolina Rice pudding" and "Carolina Snow-Balls".)

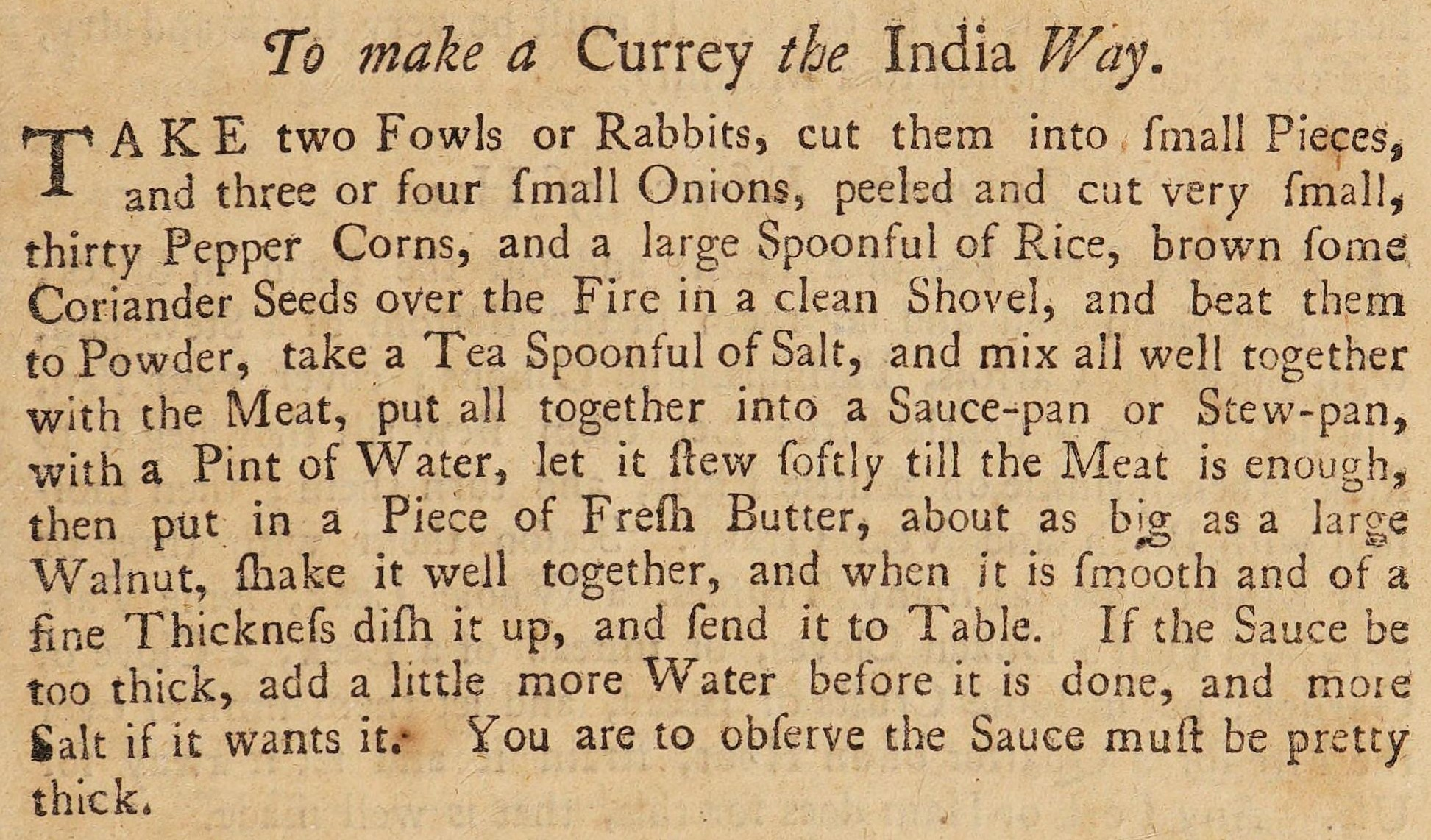
Glasse's recipe for curry, 1748—the first known written English recipe for the dish

The first edition introduced the first known English-written curry recipe, (Note: The 20th-century cookery writer Elizabeth David describes the recipe as "a quite simple formula for a kind of fricassee of chicken spiced with turmeric, ginger and pepper 'beat very fine'".) as well as three recipes for pilau; later versions included additional curry recipes and an Indian pickle. (Note: Glasse spelled pilau as "pellow" or "pelow", and her early recipes are titled "To Make a Pellow the India Way", "Another Way to Make a Pellow" and "To Make a Pelow". The "India Pickle" was introduced in the fifth edition and consisted 1 imperial gallon (1.2 U.S. gal; 4.5 L) of vinegar, 1 pound (0.45 kg) of garlic, long pepper, mustard seeds, ginger and turmeric.) These—like most of her recipes—contained no measurements or weights of ingredients, although there are some practical directions, including "about as much thyme as will lie on a sixpence". According to the food writer Adrian Miller, the book includes "the earliest written recipe that looks like the American-style preparation" of fried chicken.

Glasse added not just a recipe for "Welch rabbit" (later sometimes called Welsh rarebit), but also "English Rabbit" and "Scotch Rabbit". (Note: Scotch Rabbit is bread toasted on both sides, with cheese then melted on top; Welch Rabbit is bread toasted on both sides, with cheese then melted on top and mustard added; English Rabbit is bread toasted on both sides, then soaked in red wine, cheese put on top, placed in a tin oven to toast and brown further.) The book includes a chapter "For Captains of the Sea"—containing recipes for curing and pickling food—and recipes for "A Certain Cure for the Bite of a Mad Dog" (copied from Richard Mead) and a "Receipt [recipe] against the Plague". The 1756 edition also contained an early reference to vanilla in English cuisine and the first recorded use of jelly in trifle; she called the trifle a "floating island". Later printings added hamburgers ("hamburgh sausages"), piccalilli ("Paco-Lilla" or "India Pickle") and an early recipe for ice cream. Glasse was the first to use the term "Yorkshire pudding" in print; the recipe had first appeared in the anonymously written 1737 work The Whole Duty of a Woman under the name "dripping pudding".

Anne Willan, in her examination of historical cooks and cookery books, suggests that although it is written in an easy style, The Art of Cookery Made Plain and Easy "can never have been an easy book to use", as there was no alphabetical index in the early editions, and the organisation was erratic in places. (Note: As an example of the disarrayed layout of the book, Willian highlights the nine identical recipes of gravy that appear spread over four chapters.) Although the early versions did not contain an index at the end of the book, they have what Wendy Hall describes in her study "Literacy and the Domestic Arts" as a "jaw-droppingly extensive table of contents that categorized the subject matter over the course of twenty-two pages".

Advice from the 1828 edition

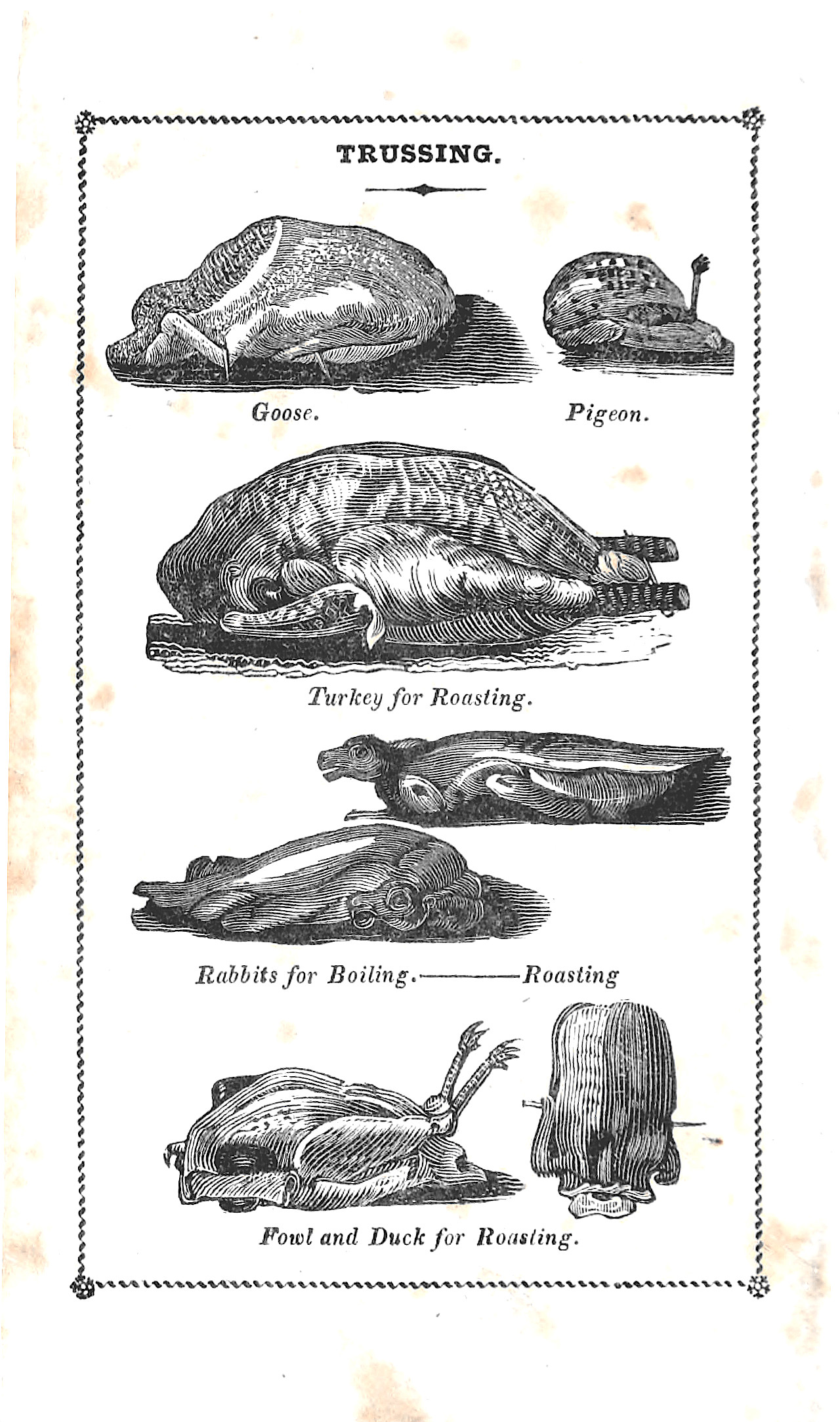
Trussing

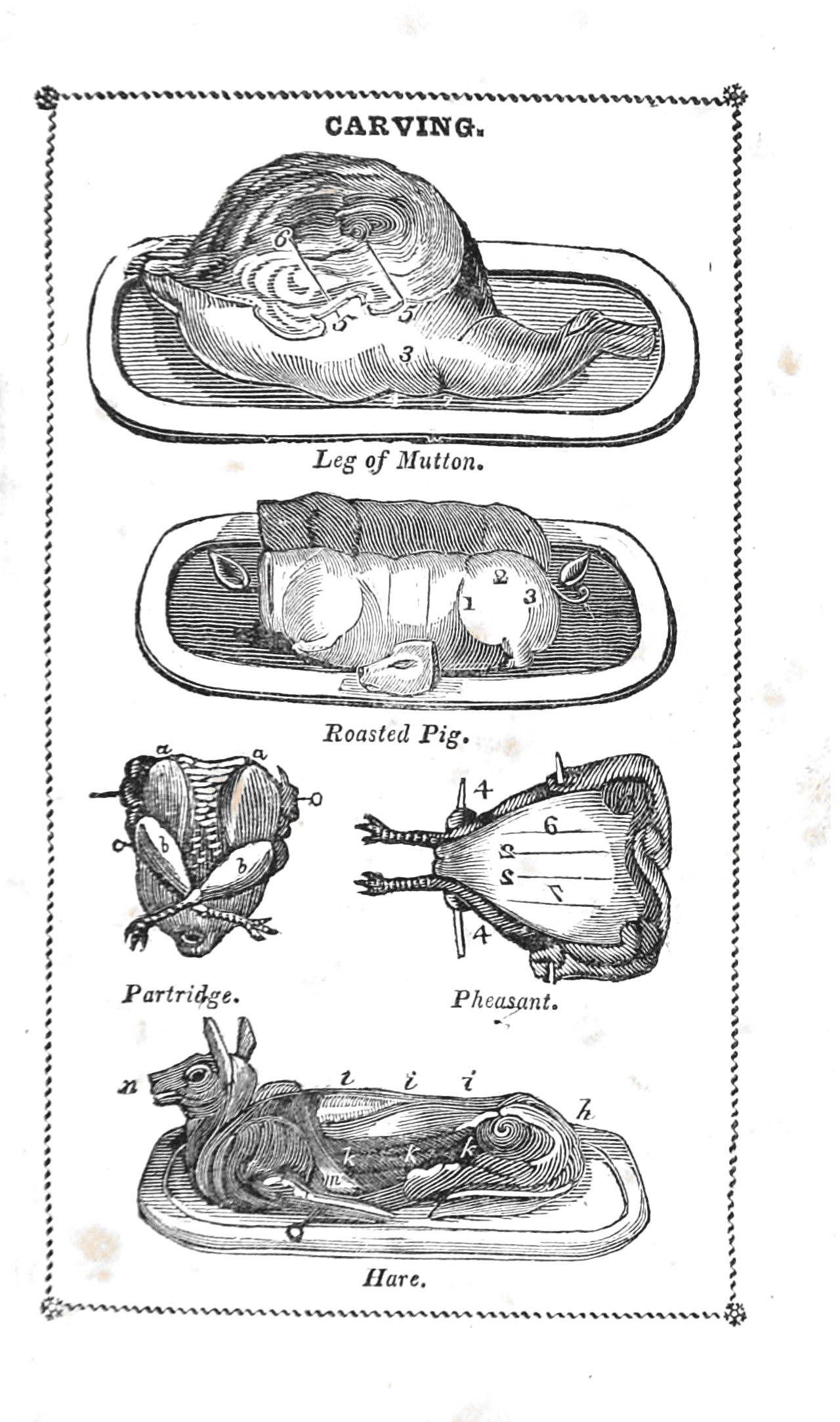
Carving

According to the historian Caroline Lieffers, Glasse was part of an increased rationalisation in cookery; although she did not give timings for all her recipes there were more than authors of earlier cookery books had printed. She was also ahead of her time in other respects: she gave a recipe for "pocket soop" years before the introduction of branded stock cube; over a century before Louis Pasteur examined microbiology and sterilisation, Glasse advised cooks, when finishing pickles and jams, to "tye them close with a bladder and a leather" to aid preservation. She went to great lengths in her books to stress the need for cleanliness in the house, particularly in the kitchen, where dirty equipment will either mar the flavour or cause illness. Her advice reflects the trend of increasing hygiene in England at the time, with piped water more widely available. The food historian Jennifer Stead writes that many visitors to England reported that the servants were clean and well turned out.

In The Art of Cookery, Glasse departs from many of her predecessors and does not provide a section of medical advice—a pattern followed in 1769 by Elizabeth Raffald in The Experienced English Housekeeper—although chapter ten of The Art of Cookery is titled "Directions for the sick", and contains recipes for broth, dishes from boiled and minced meats, caudles, gruel and various drinks, including "artificial asses milk". Glasse also did not give instructions on how to run the household. In her preface, she writes:

I shall not take upon me to meddle in the physical Way farther than two Receipts which will be of Use to the Publick in general: One is for the Bite of a mad Dog; and the other, if a Man shoud be near where the Plague is, he shall be in no Danger; which, if made Use of, would be found of very great Service to those who go Abroad.

Nor shall I take it upon me to direct a Lady in the Oeconomy of her Family, for every Mistress does, or at least ought to know what is most proper to be done there; therefore I shall not fill my Book with a deal of Nonsense of that Kind, which I am very well assur'd none will have Regard to.

Glasse aimed The Art of Cookery at a city-dwelling readership and, unlike many predecessors, there was no reference to "country gentlewomen" or the tradition of the hospitality of the gentry. The Servants' Directory was aimed solely at female members of staff, and each role undertaken by the female staff was examined and explained fully. The historian Una Robertson observes that "the torrent of instructions addressed to 'my little House-maid' must have severely confused that individual, had she been able to read".

== Legacy ==
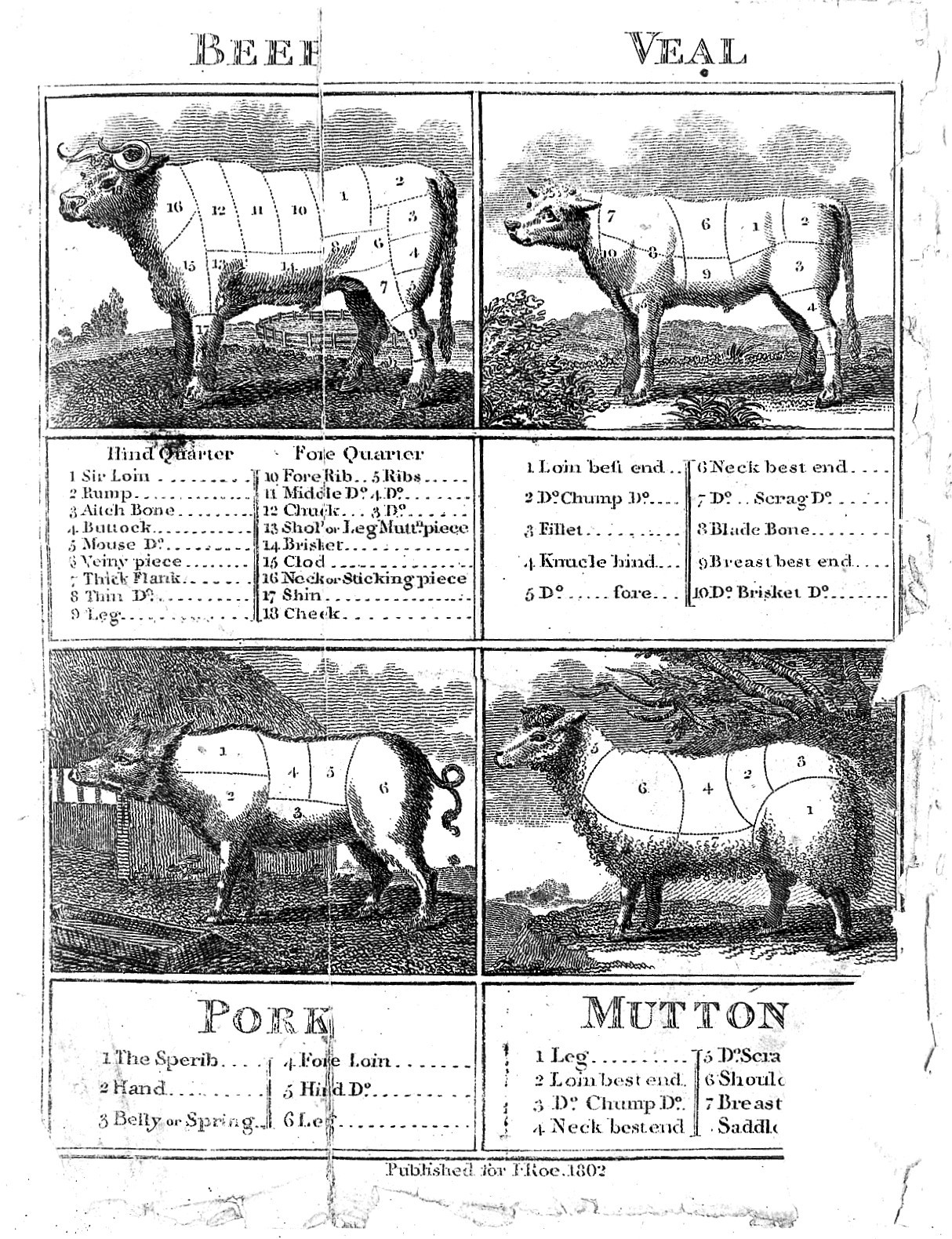
Illustrations of various cuts of pork, mutton, veal and beef; from the 1802 edition of The Art of Cookery

Information about Glasse's identity was lost for years. In 1938 Dodds confirmed the connection between her and the Allgood family in an article in Archaeologia Aeliana.

The Art of Cookery was the most popular cookery book of the 18th century and went through several reprints after Glasse's death. With over twenty reprints over a hundred years, the last edition was well into the 19th century. Glasse's work was plagiarised heavily throughout the rest of the 18th and 19th century, including in Isabella Beeton's bestselling Mrs Beeton's Book of Household Management (1861). (Note: Other works that copied Glasse include Martha Bradley's 1756 partwork British Housewife, William Gelleroy's The London Cook (1762), John Farley's 1783 work The London Art of Cookery and William Henderson's The Housekeeper's Instructor (1791).) The words "plain and easy" from the title were also used by several others. (Note: These included The Cookmaid's Assistant, or Art of Cookery, Made Plain and Easy by Elizabeth Clifton (1750), Arabella Fairfax's 1753 work Family's Best Friend: or the whole Art of Cookery, made Plain and Easy (1753) and the later editions (from 1754 onwards) of Penelope Bradshaw's The Family Jewel, and Compleat Housewife's Companion: Or, The Whole Art of Cookery Made Plain and Easy.) Copies of The Art of Cookery were taken to America by travellers, and it became one of the most popular cookery books in colonial America; it was printed in the US in 1805. It is possible that Benjamin Franklin had some of the recipes translated to French for his trip to Paris. Copies of The Servants' Directory were also extensively pirated in America.

The instruction "First catch your hare" is sometimes wrongly attributed to Glasse. The Oxford English Dictionary observes that the use is "(i.e. as the first step to cooking him): a direction jestingly ascribed to Mrs. Glasse's Cookery Book, but of much more recent origin". The mis-provenance is from the recipe for roast hare in The Art of Cookery, which begins "Take your hare when it be cas'd", meaning simply to take a skinned hare. The saying is one of around 400 of her quotations used in the Oxford English Dictionary.

In 1983 Prospect Books published a facsimile of the 1747 edition of The Art of Cookery under the title First Catch Your Hare, with introductory essays by Stead and the food historian Priscilla Bain, and a glossary by the food writer Alan Davidson; it has been reissued several times. When Stead was asked to contribute to the 1983 printing, she examined the 1747 publication and made what Davidson and the food writer Helen Saberi described as a "truly pioneering work", studying each recipe and tracing which of them were original or had been copied from other writers. It was Stead who established that Glasse had copied 342 of them from others. In 2006 Glasse was the subject of a BBC drama-documentary presented by the television cook Clarissa Dickson Wright; Dickson Wright described her subject as the "mother of the modern dinner party" and "the first domestic goddess". The 310th anniversary of Glasse's birth was the subject of a Google Doodle on 28 March 2018.

Glasse has been admired by several modern cooks and food writers. The 20th-century cookery writer Elizabeth David considers that "it is plain to me that she is reporting at first hand, and sometimes with an original and charming turn of phrase"; (Note: David referenced Glasse several times in her 1970 work Spices, Salt and Aromatics in the English Kitchen, and again in Harvest of the Cold Months (1994). In her 1977 book English Bread and Yeast Cookery, David used recipes for French bread, "bread made without the use of a barm", muffins and oatcakes, yeast dumplings and saffron cake.) the television cook Fanny Cradock provided a foreword to a reprint of The Art of Cookery in 1971, in which she praised Glasse and her approach. Craddock found the writing easy to follow and thought Glasse an honest cook, who seemed to have tried most of the recipes in the book. The food writer Jane Grigson admired Glasse's work, and in her 1974 book she included many of Glasse's recipes. (Note: These were Welsh, Scottish and English rabbit (rarebit), potted cheese, a fricassee of eggs, a white fricassee of mushrooms, Yorkshire pudding, salmagundi, rabbit casserole, Cheshire pork and apple pie, Yorkshire Christmas pye, Goose pye, whim-wham (a form of trifle), chocolate pie, and a compote of bon chrétiens pears.) Dickson Wright affirms that she has "a strong affinity for Hannah Glasse. I admire her straightforward, unpretentious approach to cookery". For Dickson Wright, "she is one of the greats of English food history."

== Notes and references ==
=== Sources ===
==== Books ====
- Aylett, Mary; Ordish, Olive (1965). First Catch Your Hare. London: Macdonald. OCLC 54053.
- Boswell, James (1906). Life of Johnson. London: Constable & Co. OCLC 221732294.
- Burnett, David; Saberi, Helen (2006). The Road to Vindaloo: Curry Cooks & Curry Books (Kindle ed.). London: Marion Boyars. ISBN 978-1-909248-12-0.
- Collingham, Alan (2006). Curry: A Tale of Cooks and Conquerors. London: Vintage. ISBN 978-0-0994-3786-4.
- Colquhoun, Kate (2007). Taste: the Story of Britain Through its Cooking. New York: Bloomsbury. ISBN 978-1-5969-1410-0.
- Coyle, L. Patrick (1985). Cooks' Books: An Affectionate Guide to the Literature of Food and Cooking. New York: Fact on File. ISBN 978-0-87196-683-4.
- David, Elizabeth (1975) [1970]. Spices, Salt and Aromatics in the English Kitchen. Harmondsworth, Middlesex: Penguin. ISBN 978-0-1404-6796-3.
- David, Elizabeth (2001) [2000]. Is There a Nutmeg in the House?. Jill Norman (ed). London: Penguin. ISBN 978-0-14-029290-9.
- David, Elizabeth (1979) [1977]. English Bread and Yeast Cookery. Harmondsworth: Penguin. ISBN 978-0-1402-9974-8.
- David, Elizabeth (1996) [1994]. Harvest of the Cold Months: The Social History of Ice and Ices. London: Michael Joseph. ISBN 978-0-14-017641-4.
- Davidson, Alan (2014). The Oxford Companion to Food. Oxford: Oxford University Press. ISBN 978-0-19-104072-6. Archived from the original on 29 March 2021.
- Davidson, Alan; Saberi, Helen, eds. (2002). The Wilder Shores of Gastronomy: Twenty Years of the Best Food Writing From the Journal Petits Propos Culinaires. Berkeley, CA: Ten Speed Press. ISBN 978-1-5800-8417-8.
- Dickson Wright, Clarissa (2011). A History of English Food (Kindle ed.). London: Random House. ISBN 978-1-4481-0745-2.
- Glasse, Hannah (1748). The Art of Cookery Made Plain and Easy (Third ed.). London: Published by the author. OCLC 938365682.
- Glasse, Hannah (1772). The Compleat Confectioner: Or, The Whole Art of Confectionary Made Plain and Easy. London: J. Cooke. OCLC 28134185.
- Grigson, Jane (1993) [1974]. English Food. London: Penguin. ISBN 978-0-1410-4586-3.
- Hardy, Sheila (2011). The Real Mrs Beeton: The Story of Eliza Acton. Stroud, Gloucestershire: The History Press. ISBN 978-0-7524-6122-9.
- Hess, John L.; Hess, Karen (2000). The Taste of America. Champaign, IL: University of Illinois Press. ISBN 978-0-252-06875-1. Archived from the original on 29 March 2021.
- Hughes, Kathryn (2006). The Short Life and Long Times of Mrs Beeton. London: HarperCollins Publishers. ISBN 978-0-7524-6122-9. Archived from the original on 3 November 2020.
- Lehman, Gilly (2003). The British Housewife: Cooking and Society in 18th-century Britain (Kindle ed.). Totness, Devon: Prospect Books. ISBN 978-1-909248-00-7.
- Miller, Adrian (2013). Soul Food: The Surprising Story of an American Cuisine, One Plate at a Time. Chapel Hill, North Carolina: The University of North Carolina Press. ISBN 978-1-4696-0762-7.
- Notaker, Henry (2017). A History of Cookbooks: From Kitchen to Page over Seven Centuries. Oakland, CA: University of California Press. ISBN 978-0-520-96728-1. Archived from the original on 1 August 2020.
- Quayle, Eric (1978). Old Cook Books: An Illustrated History. London: Cassell. ISBN 978-0-289-70707-4.
- Quinzio, Geraldine M. (2009). Of Sugar and Snow: A History of Ice Cream Making. Berkeley, CA: University of California Press. ISBN 978-0-520-94296-7.
- Robertson, Una (1997). An Illustrated History of the Housewife, 1650–1950. New York: St. Martin's Press. ISBN 978-0-3121-7712-6.
- Smith, Andrew F. (2013). Food and Drink in American History: A "Full Course" Encyclopedia. Santa Barbara, CA: ABC-CLIO. ISBN 978-1-61069-233-5. Archived from the original on 29 March 2021.
- Snodgrass, Mary Ellen (2004). Encyclopedia of Kitchen History. Abingdon, Oxfordshire: Routledge. ISBN 978-1-135-45572-9. Archived from the original on 18 October 2020.
- Stead, Jennifer (2002). "Quizzing Glasse, or Hannah Scrutinzed". In Davidson, Alan; Saberi, Helen (eds.). The Wilder Shores of Gastronomy: Twenty Years of the Best Food Writing From the Journal Petits Propos Culinaires. Berkeley, CA: Ten Speed Press. pp. 333–352. ISBN 978-1-5800-8417-8.
- Walker, Julian (2013). Discovering Words in the Kitchen. London: Bloomsbury Publishing. ISBN 978-0-7478-0952-4. Archived from the original on 1 August 2020.
- Willan, Anne (1992). Great Cooks and their Recipes. London: Pavilion Books. ISBN 978-1-85145-596-6.
- Willan, Anne; Cherniavsky, Mark (2012). The Cookbook Library: Four Centuries of the Cooks, Writers, and Recipes That Made the Modern Cookbook. Berkeley, CA: University of California Press. ISBN 978-0-520-24400-9. Archived from the original on 29 March 2021.

==== Journals ====
- Bickham, Troy (February 2008). "Eating the Empire: Intersections of Food, Cookery and Imperialism in Eighteenth-Century Britain". Past & Present (198): 71–109. doi:10.1093/pastj/gtm054. JSTOR 25096701.
- Brewer, Charlotte (February 2012). "'Happy Copiousness'? OED's Recording of Female Authors of the Eighteenth Century". The Review of English Studies. 63 (258): 86–117. doi:10.1093/res/hgq102. JSTOR 41410091.
- "By the King's Patent". The London Gazette. No. 9416. 15 October 1754. p. 4.
- Dodds, Madeline Hope (1938). "The Rival Cooks: Hannah Glasse and Ann Cook" (PDF). Archaeologia Aeliana. 4 (15): 43–68. Archived from the original on 29 October 2019.
- Hall, Wendy (September 2010). "Literacy and the Domestic Arts". Huntington Library Quarterly. 73 (3): 383–412. doi:10.1525/hlq.2010.73.3.383.
- Lieffers, Caroline (June 2012). "'The Present Time is Eminently Scientific': The Science of Cookery in Nineteenth-Century Britain". Journal of Social History. 45 (4): 936–959. doi:10.1093/jsh/shr106. JSTOR 41678945.
- Lucraft, Fiona (1992). "The London Art of Plagiarism, Part One". Petits Propos Culinaires. 42: 7–24. ISSN 0142-7857.
- Lucraft, Fiona (1993). "The London Art of Plagiarism, Part Two". Petits Propos Culinaires. 43: 34–46. ISSN 0142-7857.

==== News ====
- "Notices". The Newcastle Courant. 8 September 1770. p. 2.
- Prince, Rose (24 June 2006). "Hannah Glasse: The original domestic goddess". The Independent. Archived from the original on 7 June 2010.
- Sommerlad, Joe (28 March 2018). "Hannah Glasse: How the British writer's seminal recipe book democratised cookery". The Independent. Archived from the original on 21 May 2019.

==== Internet ====
- Clark, Gregory (2018). "The Annual RPI and Average Earnings for Britain, 1209 to Present (New Series)". MeasuringWorth. Archived from the original on 17 December 2017.
- "The Compleat Confectioner". WorldCat. Archived from the original on 29 March 2021.
- "first catch your hare". Oxford English Dictionary (online ed.). Oxford University Press. (Subscription or participating institution membership required.)
- "Formats and Editions of First Catch your Hare: the Art of Cookery Made Plain and Easy (1747)". Worldcat. Archived from the original on 29 March 2021.
- "Hannah Glasse's 310th Birthday". Google. Archived from the original on 26 March 2019.
- "Hannah Glasse (Biographical details)". The British Museum. Archived from the original on 29 March 2021.
- "Hannah Glasse – the First Domestic Goddess". BBC Genome. Archived from the original on 29 March 2021.
- Hoare, Charlotte (19 May 2014). "The Art of Cookery / by a lady". St John's College Cambridge. Archived from the original on 26 February 2019.
- "Professed Cookery". WorldCat. Archived from the original on 29 March 2021.
- Robb-Smith, A. H. T. (2004). "Glasse [née Allgood], Hannah (bap. 1708, d. 1770)". Oxford Dictionary of National Biography. Oxford University Press. doi:10.1093/ref:odnb/10804. (subscription, Wikipedia Library access or UK public library membership required)
