= Lancelot Allgood =

British landowner and politician (1711–1782)

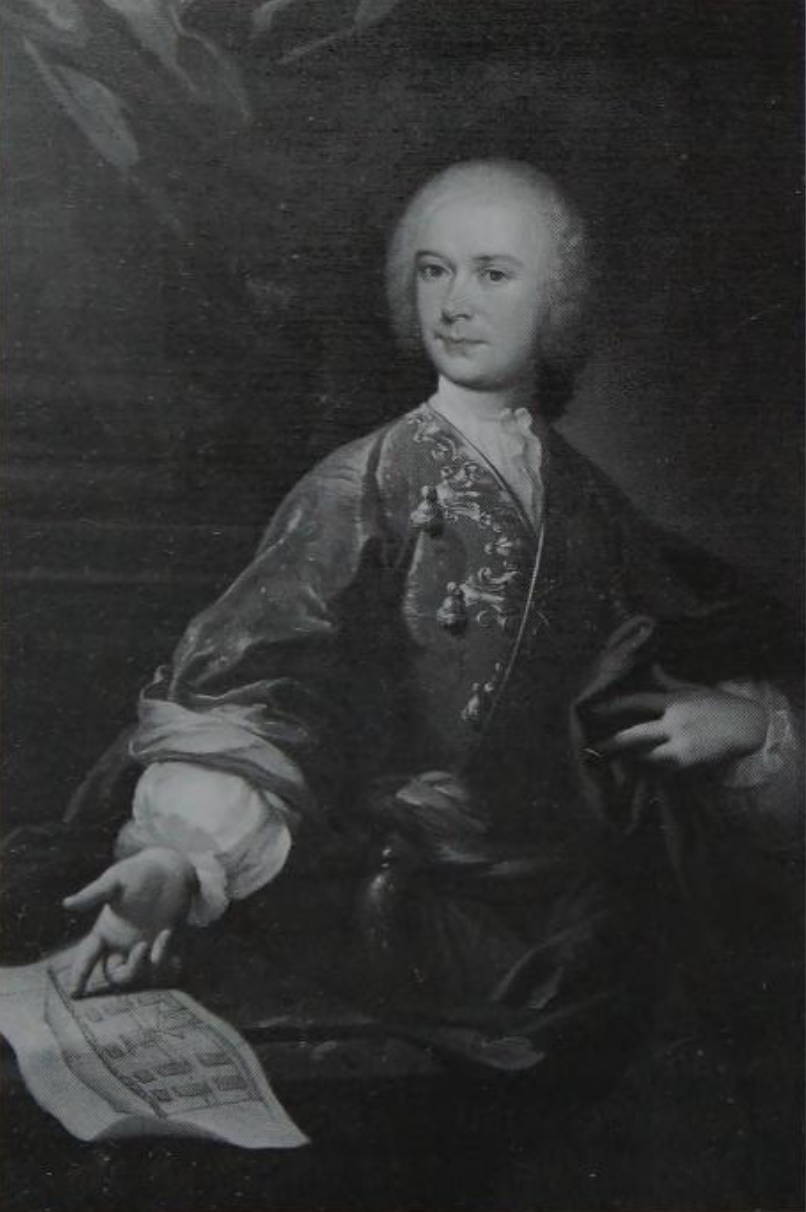
- Lancelot Allgood pointing to a plan of Nunwick Hall, which dates the painting to about 1738
- Born: 11 February 1711; Hedgeley, Northumberland
- Died: 26 April 1782 (aged 71)
- Occupations: Landowner, politician
- Known for: High Sheriff of Northumberland, Member of Parliament, Deputy Lord Lieutenant
- Title: High Sheriff of Northumberland (1746); MP for Northumberland (1748–1754); Deputy Lord Lieutenant of Northumberland
- Spouse: Jane Allgood
- Children: 8
- Parents: Isaac Allgood; Grandson of Rev. Major Allgood
- Relatives: Hannah Glasse (half-sister)

Lancelot Allgood (11 February 1711 – 26 April 1782) was a British landowner and politician who served as High Sheriff of Northumberland in 1746, and as member of parliament for Northumberland in the 10th Parliament of Great Britain between February 1748 and 1754. He also served as a deputy Lord Lieutenant of Northumberland.

Allgood is remembered as the sponsor of the corn road from Hexham to Alnmouth, and of the military road from Carlisle to Newcastle, both of which were established under Turnpike Acts during his short tenure as MP.

He is also remembered as an antagonist in a feud with Ann Cook and her husband, innkeepers, which played out in cookery books Cook authored, attacking Allgood, his half-sister Hannah Glasse, who was herself a cookery book writer, and his aunt Margaret Widdrington.

Allgood is implicated as one of the authorities commanding a militia which, in a 1761 riot in Hexham, killed 45 people. More generally, Allgood was a member of a family against whom many in Hexham held a grudge arising out of their failure to follow the Jacobitism of the Earl of Derwentwater.

== Biography ==
Lancelot Allgood was born 11 February 1711 the son of Isaac Allgood, of Brandon White House, Hedgeley, Northumberland, (Note: Brandon White House coordinates: 55.455269°N 1.912450°W) and grandson of the Rev. Major Allgood, Rector of Simonburn. Isaac Allgood died in 1725, and Lancelot inherited his estate aged 14.

Allgood studied at Brasenose College, Oxford, matriculating on 20 November 1730, and was admitted to Gray's Inn on 6 January 1731.

He took a Grand Tour in the later 1730s and is recorded to have met and travelled for some time with Thomas Forster of Adderstone, a great friend of Allgood's father, but who was from 1716 a Jacobite exile in Europe after playing a leading part in the north of England in the Jacobite rising of 1715.

Allgood married his relative, Jane (born 1721), daughter and heir of Robert Allgood, of Nunwick, near Simonburn, Northumberland on 22 February 1739. Robert Allgood had purchased Nunwick from the Herons of Chipchase, and when he died it came to Lancelot by virtue of his marriage. Allgood commissioned the erection of Nunwick Hall at the junction of Simon Burn and the River North Tyne.

Lancelot Allgood was Sheriff of Northumberland in 1746, the year in which Bonnie Prince Charlie's Jacobite rising of 1745 was put down by the Duke of Cumberland. Allgood was present at the reception of the Duke of Cumberland in Newcastle in January 1746 and witnessed the ceremony of presenting him with the freedom of the town on his return from the victory of Culloden in April 1746.

A vacancy occurred in the Parliamentary representation of Northumberland by the death of John Fenwick on 19 December 1747, and Allgood became a candidate for the seat. The old member was a Tory; his colleague, Sir William Middleton, 3rd Baronet, was a Whig. Parties were so evenly balanced in the county that the Whigs were encouraged to try for both seats. Allgood being a Tory, the Whigs put forward Lord Ossulston, son and heir of Charles Bennet, 2nd Earl of Tankerville, to oppose him. The election took place at Alnwick in February 1748, commencing on the 18th of that month and lasting six days. At the declaration of the poll, there was a squabble with the sheriff, Nicholas Brown of Bolton, and for a time, it was uncertain which of the candidates had been elected. Allgood polled 982 votes, Ossulston 971, but the sheriff rejected 27 of the Tory votes and declared Lord Ossulston elected by a majority of 16. Thereupon Mr. Allgood presented a petition to Parliament, complaining of an undue return. Both parties were ordered to attend at the bar of the House, but the matter was postponed, and the House rose without deciding the question. Allgood renewed his application in November 1748, and 14 February 1749 was fixed for the hearing, on which occasion Mr. Fox (Note: Presumably Henry Fox, 1st Baron Holland, the only sitting MP with surname Fox (although there was also George Fox-Lane, 1st Baron Bingley). The Journal of the House of Commons states that "The House was informed, by one of their members, that the sitting member being out of order and unable to attend himself, had authorized him to acquaint this House that upon consideration of all of the circumstances attending the said election and return, he begs leave to give the House no further trouble.") told the House that Lord Ossulston would give no further trouble in the affair, and Mr. Allgood was declared duly elected. (Note: Electoral irregularities were commonplace in these times. George Tate relates that the fourteen members of the four-and-twenty of Alnwick – a common council of the town's burgesses – sought to tip the balance in Allgood's favour by excessive scrutiny of the qualification to vote of freeholders, and by letting the town hall for the exclusive use of the Allgood faction. This met with some disfavour and one Richard Grieve informed the council that he would take the town hall by force. On one of the mornings of the election, he did so at the head of a party of Lord Ossulston's friends armed with bludgeons amidst much bloodshed. Tate notes that "Great joy filled the corporate bosom when their cause triumphed and it found expression as was usual in jollification; the Town Hall was illuminated and they squandered away £8 15s 6d for punch and ale to themselves and £5 4s 0d for Ale given to the populace.")

The fact of the 1745 Rebellion, the relationship between Tories and Jacobites, and Allgood's supposed Jacobite sympathies all were of the moment in the election. However Henry Carr, a Whig elector, commented in a letter that "considering Mr. Allgood’s good character and his zealous behaviour in the late rebellion, I cannot bring myself to vote against him." (Carr also drew adverse implications from the absence from Northumberland of Lord Ossulston's father, the then Lord Lieutenant of Northumberland, during the rising, and analysed the state of the Tory & Jacobite alliance.) (Note: Henry Carr wrote: "I should certainly vote for Lord O. if he had been opposed by any person reasonably suspected of Jacobitism, but considering Mr. Algood's good character and his zealous behaviour in the late Rebellion, I cannot bring myself to vote against him in favour of the son of a man who, though Lord Lieutenant of the County, deserted it so shamefully in the time of danger and who seems to have nothing said in his favour but that he is a Whig set up by the Whig party, who I wish had made a choice of a man of more merit, as I think we shall look a little too sour and shew ourselves irreconcilable to the bare name of a Tory if we can't be so far soften'd and reconciled by Mr. Algood's behaviour as to look upon him almost as one of ourselves but must to a man oppose him. And if that should be the case I fear the consequences of it would be a reuniting of the Jacobites and the Tories whom the latter at the time of the Rebellion separated themselves from, and which separation, I hoped, would continue and bring the moderate part of them over to us, if we show a reasonable moderation on our side and a readiness to receive them.")

In 1749 Allgood inherited, through his wife Jane, an estate at Seghill, Northumberland, previously the property of a relative, George Allgood. In 1751 Allgood was given the freedom of the town and borough of Alnwick.

At the next election, in 1754, Allgood announced his willingness to submit his claims once more to the freeholders. His party, however, made no favourable sign, and Lord Ossulston having succeeded to the earldom, Sir Henry Grey, of Howick, and the old member, Sir William Middleton, were returned without opposition.

Upon the accession of George III in 1760, Allgood received the honour of knighthood. In 1777 he inherited from his great-aunt land at Netherwitton, including Colt Park, East Ritton, Birkheads and Coldrife.

=== Feud ===
Allgood appears to have precipitated and taken part in a feud with Ann Cook and her husband John, starting in 1740, and continuing and expanding through a number of publications of a book by Cook, Professed Cookery, in which she attacks Allgood, his half-sister Hannah Glasse, and his aunt Margaret Widdrington.

The feud arose out of what seems to have been a misapprehension on Allgood's part about John Cook, landlord of the Black Bull in Hexham, charging a visiting party of judges for six bottles of wine which had been taken from Allgood cellar, given, in Allgood's understanding, as a gift. (Later testimony seems to suggest that Cook had purchased, or offered to purchase, the wine from Allgood and that his charging the judges for it was reasonable, and that Allgood's understanding that the bottles had been gifted was in error.) Allgood publicly upbraided Cook for his supposed dishonorable conduct; Ann Cook immediately attacked Allgood by letter, both on the facts and on his character; Allgood responded (in Cook's words) that whilst he "could freely forgive my husband, but swore to be the destruction of the Bitch of his wife'.

Thereafter Allgood appears to have sought to boycott the Black Bull; incidents in 1743 and 1745 are adduced as Allgood seeking to damage trade at the inn by refusing to dine there with Commissioners of the Land Tax, and refusing to sanction horse-racing in Hexham. In 1745 the Cooks appear to have sought to move away from Hexham to pastures anew in Morpeth, but, unfortunately, took a tenancy on the Queen's Head there, owned by Thomas Pye, a cousin of Allgood and, so the story goes, this enabled Allgood to put pressure on Pye to pursue the Cooks for the peremptory repayment of a bond they had entered into for the Queen's Head, and which they had insufficient liquidity to repay. The upshot was the Cooks decamping to Newcastle and John Cook being held in debtors prison for the outstanding amount of the bond.

Ann Cook decided to take her revenge. Hannah Glasse, half-sister of Allgood, had written a very successful cookery book, The Art of Cookery Made Plain and Easy in 1747. And Margaret Widdrington, Allgood's father's sister, had been an impoverished neighbour assisted by Cook before a marriage which left her very wealthy and removed her from Cook's social circle. In 1754 Cook had published Professed Cookery, a recipe and household management book prefaced by 66 pages of "appalling doggerel" constituting a "violent onslaught" on her three related enemies, Allgood taking the name 'Esquire Flash' in her writings. A second edition was published in 1755 and a third in 1760.

=== Roads ===
While Mr. Allgood was in Parliament the one absorbing local question was the construction of roads. The rebellion of 1745 brought the great roadmaker, Marshal Wade, to Newcastle, and inspired the freeholders of Northumberland to "mend their ways" in emulation of his achievements in Scotland. In 1747, Newcastle Corporation made the road across the Town Moor, and Parliament passed the first Turnpike Act for Northumberland—an Act which authorised the continuation of the Town Moor Road from the borough boundary at Gosforth to Buckton Burn, near Belford. (Note: The Town Moor, Gosforth, Belford road forms part of the Great North Road and later the A1 road.) The road through Ponteland followed, and in 1751 Allgood was entrusted with a petition for leave to bring in a bill authorising the repair and widening of the road from Alnmouth to Alnwick, and by Lemington Coal Houses, and along Edlingham Dikes to Rothbury, from there south to Coldrife, by Ewesley Gate to Cambo and Wallington, by Kirkharle and Little Bavington to Colwell, Chollerton, and Wall to Hexham, and also a road leading out of the Alnwick to Rothbury road, to Jockey's Dike Bridge. Leave was given, and Allgood had charge of the measure through its various stages until it received the Royal Assent. Two similar bills—one for a road from Longhorsley through Weldon Bridge and Whittingham to the Breamish, and the other for a road leading from Morpeth, through Mitford, Longwitton, and by Rothley Park wall to the High Cross at Elsdon—were in charge of Sir William Middleton, with Allgood as a member of the committee to which the details were referred.

In what was perhaps another echo of the Jacobite Catholic fracture in Northumbrian society, historian Cadwallader John Bates, himself a Catholic, is said by Honeyman to go out of his way in his History of Northumberland, to specify of Allgood's military road that "For ordinary purposes there is not a worse engineered road in the Kingdom." (Note: Cadwallader Bates spends a full paragraph pointing out the advantages of, the benefits brought by, and the general success of the Newcastle to Carlisle road, before asserting, without any explanation, his dislike of its engineering.)

=== Riot ===
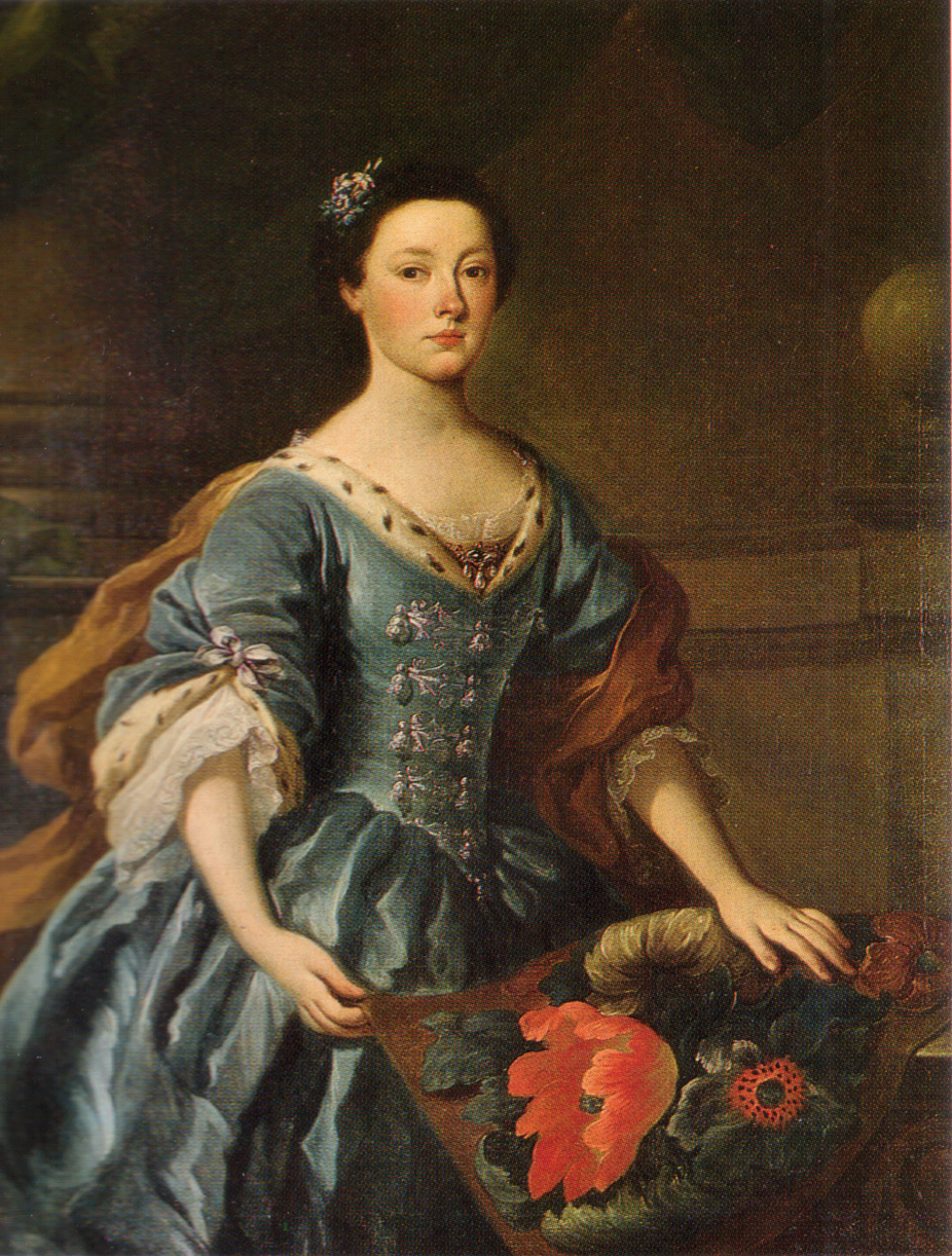
Jane Allgood, who dealt with the residual animosity of the Tynedale community after the 1861 riot

In 1757 a Militia Act, which provided for the compulsory enrolment of men, was passed with a view of raising forces against the risks arising from conflicts which came to be known as the Seven Years' War. Although military authorities experienced little difficulty drafting troops in Newcastle and training them in Berwick, they met with severe resistance in Hexham, where the populace petitioned against the Act and made death threats against the Deputy-Lieutenants responsible for its enforcement, one of whom was Allgood. This led, on 9 March 1761, to a riot in which 45 people were killed and hundreds wounded by members of the Yorkshire Militia, employed by the Deputy-Lieutenants. Allgood later went as far as to write to the Newcastle Journal denying that he had offered the militia money to fire upon the crowd.

It was reported that during the outbreak he and Christopher Reed, of Chipchase, hid themselves in a hayloft. In a notorious pamphlet, published shortly afterwards, entitled The Will of a certain Northern Vicar, this assumed escapade is satirised in halting rhyme:

I give the corpulent Kitt Reed
My lecture upon gingerbread.
And leave him too (tho' not for Fun),
For fear of Harm — a Wooden Gun;
At the same time (in case of Riot),
A Cockloft, for to keep him quiet :
A Ladder too (Fame do not tattle).
To aid him in the day of battle.
And to his worthy Comorade [Sir Lancelot],
Who with 'im such a Figure made,
A large Birch Rod, that He may be
Tickled most exceedingly.

Allgood fled Nunwick House after the riots, staying in Newcastle and leaving his wife to defend the house against the discontented of Tynedale—which she did in no uncertain terms, lecturing them on the need to behave themselves as loyal subjects in a Christian country. She also effectively ordered Allgood to return, pointing out that if he did not, the rioters would fancy that they'd banished him from his own county; and offering to come and collect him in her carriage "for I am under no more apprehension travelling ... than I ever was".

=== Death ===
Lady Jane Allgood predeceased her spouse, Lancelot, dying in March 1778. Sir Lancelot Allgood died on 26 April 1782, and was succeeded by his son, James Allgood, LL.D., (1749–1807) Sheriff of Northumberland in 1786. Jane and Lancelot Allgood had eight children. Their firstborn, Robert Allgood (1740–1756), drowned whilst at Eton College. Three succeeding children died young—Jane Allgood (1743–1747), Lancelot Allgood (1744–1747) and Margaret Allgood (1746–1747). Jane Allgood (1751–1776) died unmarried. Two of his daughters were married to members of the Loraine family—Hannah (1753–1797) to William, afterwards Sir William Loraine, 4th Baronet, and Isabella (b. 1754) to Rev. Lambton Loraine, his brother.

=== Jacobitism ===
There is, throughout the incidents appertaining to Allgood, an undercurrent of the effect of northern Jacobitism on his life. The Allgood family were identified as Jacobites before 1715, variously working for James Radclyffe, 3rd Earl of Derwentwater who was beheaded in 1716 for his part in the Jacobite rising of 1715, or as in the case of Allgood's grandfather, being established by Derwentwater as the incumbent at Simonburn. Allgood travelled with Jacobites during his grand tour. Ann Cook's attack on Allgood measured him against the Earl of Derwentwater, who was seen as a paragon in Hexham. Allgood's work as Sheriff and his election as MP were viewed, to some extent, through a Jacobite prism. His concentration on roads can be seen to arise, at least in part, from the general concern about the mobility of the army after the 1745 Rebellion. And the riots which occurred in Hexham, in which he was implicated, have been seen as a manifestation of residual dislike of the Hanoverian assumption of monarchy and an expression of Catholic—and hence Jacobite—feeling in Hexham. More generally Honeyman identifies that many in Hexham held a grudge against the Allgood family arising from their cleaving from Derwentwater and Jacobitism.

Henry Carr spoke for Allgood's willingness to put to one side any residual affection he might have had for the Jacobite cause; Honeyman's verdict on Allgood was that he was a public-spirited if maligned individual.
