= Penelope Bradshaw =

British cookery book compiler

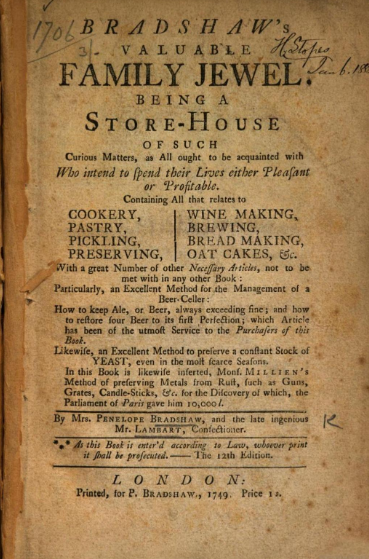
- Genre: cookery

Penelope Bradshaw (?–1754?) was a British compiler of a cookery book which was known under a variety of titles including The Valuable Family Jewel and Bradshaw's Valuable Family Companion.

== Life ==
Hardly anything is known about Penelope Bradshaw apart from her cookery book which went under various titles including "The Family Jewel" and "Bradshaw's Valuable Family Companion". There are a few facts about her included in her work but much of the information is created to market the book. It is claimed that she had a long career looking after aristocratic families which may be true.

There are many editions of her book which vary in title, length and the negligent claims of being the such and such edition. However, there is one book which appeared first (as the "10th edition") in 1748 and it was re-titled, re-packaged and re-created until the final version in 1754 when the author is thought to have already been dead. The 1748 publication notes that the book was "Begun by Mrs Eliza Johnson, and now finished by Mrs Penelope Bradshaw and Mr Lambart". This acknowledgment reveals that the book uses recipes taken from other sources. These sources include a local confectioner named Edward Lambert and from other books by Eliza Johnson and Hannah Glasse. Glasse's cook book was published only the year before in 1747 as "The Art of Cookery, Made Plain and Easy" and Johnson makes only minor adjustments to conceal the fact that she borrowed from the book. Bradshaw would take one of Glasse's recipes from her (more successful) book and then she would double all the ingredients or halve them. The first edition contained few original recipes but more were added in later versions.
