= Ann Cook (cookery book writer) =

English writer (fl. c. 1725 – c. 1760)

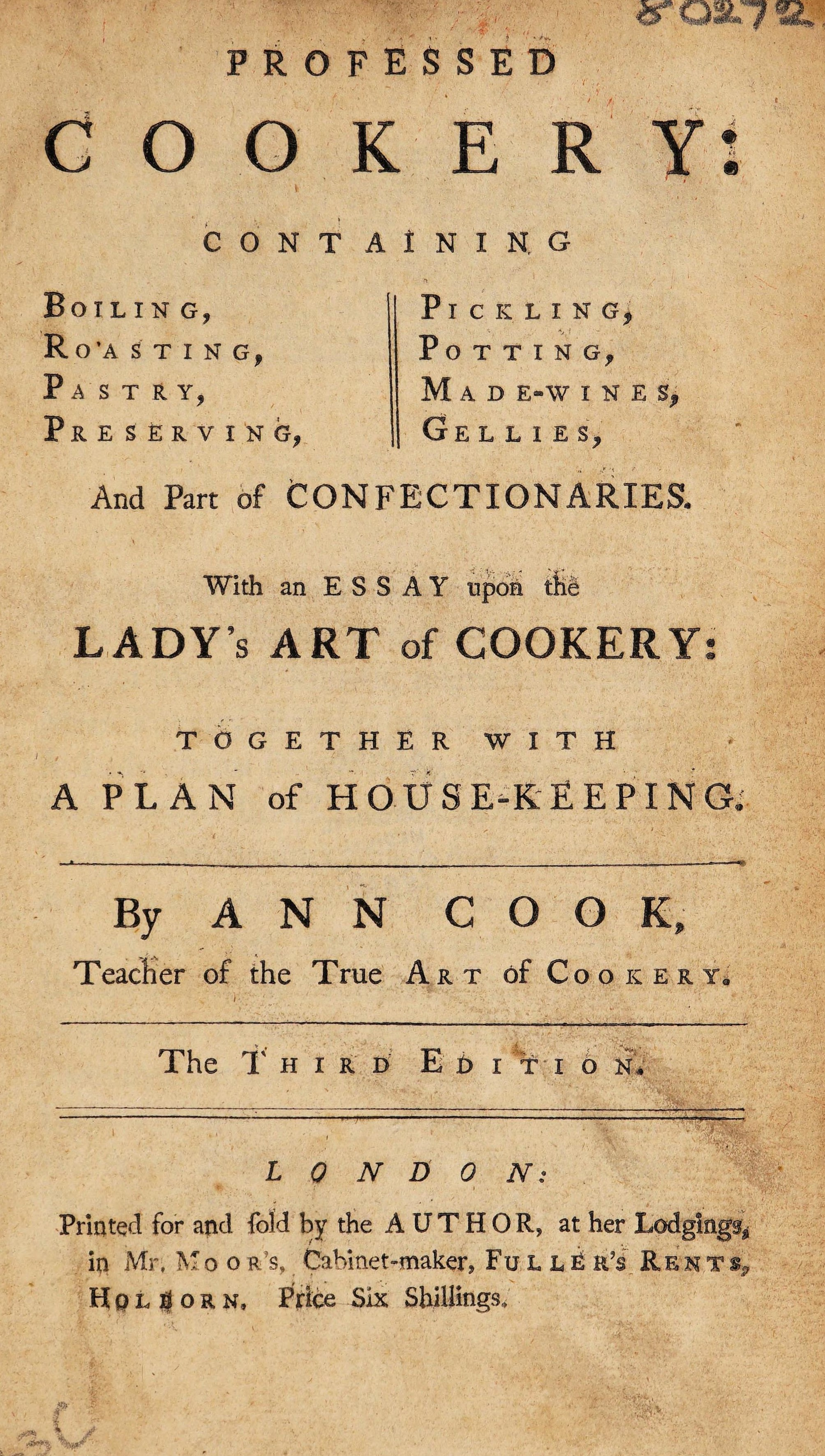
Title page of the third edition of Professed Cookery, 1760

Ann H. Cook (fl. c. 1725 – c. 1760) was an English cookery book writer and innkeeper. In 1754 she published Professed Cookery, which went on to two further editions in her lifetime.

Living in Hexham, Northumberland, in 1739–1740 Cook and her husband John became embroiled in a feud with a well-connected local landowner, Sir Lancelot Allgood, following an argument over an invoice the Cooks had issued. Although they were later exonerated, Allgood continued his attack on them, forcing them to leave their inn and move. Their finances suffered and John was imprisoned for non-payment of debts. To earn money, Cook wrote The New System of Cookery in 1753, which was reissued as Professed Cookery in 1754. In the work, in addition to a range of recipes, she included a poem and an "Essay upon the Lady's Art of Cookery". This was an attack on Allgood's half-sister Hannah Glasse, who had published a best-selling cookery book, The Art of Cookery Made Plain and Easy, in 1747.

Further editions of Professed Cookery were published in 1755 and 1760; a revised edition, containing a selection of the recipes from the first edition, was published in 1936. In the first two editions of the work, Cook was stated as living in Newcastle upon Tyne; for the 1760 third edition, she was living in lodgings in Holborn, London. The second and third editions of Professed Cookery cover several areas, including a critical analysis of Glasse's work, traditional English recipes and an essay on household management that includes a biography of a friend and Cook's autobiography. The introduction, written as a poem, accuses Glasse of plagiarism and mocks her capability of being a teacher, as well as poking fun at her illegitimacy.

== Life ==
Little is known about Ann Cook's early life, although she was probably born in the late 1690s and possibly in County Durham. According to the autobiographical account she included in her cookery book, she worked as a cook and housekeeper; the historian Madeleine Hope Dodds considers it likely that she went into service aged about twelve. Ann married John Cook around 1725–1727; (Note: Historians differ on the point: Madeleine Hope Dodds says it was in 1725, Gilly Lehmann suggests it may have been "probably about 1727".) he was the licensed tenant of the Black Bull inn in Hexham, Northumberland. The Black Bull was one of the principal inns of the town and contained assembly rooms for social events. It is possible that the Cooks were Roman Catholic. The couple had at least two daughters—the elder of whom was born in 1728—and three sons.

In 1739–1740, during the Lent circuit of the assizes, Sir Lancelot Allgood, who held positions of high sheriff and Member of Parliament, sent a message to the Black Bull that the visiting judge and his party wanted six bottles of good French wine, and that John Cook should order them in. The judge was dissatisfied with the wine and sent a message to Allgood's estate to borrow wine from there; Allgood sent him the bottles as a gift. As the original six bottles of wine had been consumed, John charged them to Allgood's account. When Allgood and the judge met, they came to the erroneous conclusion that John had charged the judge for the gifted wine. Allgood publicly accused the landlord of cheating him, and threatened to ruin him, resulting in a feud between the two, partly inflamed by Ann's defence of her husband.

In late 1745 the Cooks moved from the Black Bull to Morpeth, Northumberland, where they ran the Queen's Head inn on behalf of the landlord, Thomas Pye. To secure their position, they entered into a bond of £369 with Pye. (Note: £369 in 1745 equates to approximately £77,000 in 2025, according to calculations based on the Consumer Price Index (CPI) measure of inflation.) The Cooks did not know that Pye was a cousin of Allgood; in 1746 Allgood accused Mr Cook of being, in Dodds's words "a rebel, a rogue and a villain". Calling him "a rebel" was an accusation of his being a Jacobite—the Jacobite rising of 1745 still continued and was causing fear in many parts of northern England. The persecution continued in 1749 when Pye instigated a rumour that because the Cooks were selling their household possessions, they were insolvent and on the verge of abandoning the town. In reality they were giving some of their unneeded possessions to their eldest daughter who had recently married and was running an inn with her new husband in Newcastle upon Tyne. By this stage the Cooks had paid back £320 of the £369 bond; they sold most of their remaining goods and moved to Newcastle with the intention of setting up a pastrycook shop. Their creditors followed them for the balance of the bond, and would not allow any terms for an easy settlement; John was taken to a debtors' prison within a month of their arrival in the new town. Nothing further is known of him.

According to Gilly Lehmann, Cook's biographer in the Oxford Dictionary of National Biography, it appears that Cook wrote The New System of Cookery in order to earn money. The work was on sale by February 1753; the title page stated the book was "sold by the Author, at her House in the Groat-market" in Newcastle. (Note: No copy of this work exists, but was advertised that month in The Newcastle Journal.) The work was republished in 1754 under the title Professed Cookery. (Note: Professed Cookery had the subtitle "containing boiling, roasting, pastry, preserving, pickling, potting, made-wines, gellies and part of confectionaries. With an essay upon the lady's art of cookery; together with a plan of housekeeping".) In addition to recipes, the book contained a poem and an "Essay upon the Lady's Art of Cookery". Both the poem and essay were an attack on Allgood's half-sister, Hannah Glasse, who had published the cookery book The Art of Cookery Made Plain and Easy in 1747; Glasse's work was a best-seller and made her one of the best-known writers of the time.

A second edition of Professed Cookery was published in 1755, which added a "Plan of House-Keeping" to the contents. Cook's address was again given on the title page as a house in the Groat-market. A third edition of Professed Cookery was published around or after 1760; its title page stated that Cook was a lodger at the house of the cabinet maker Mr Moor, in Fuller's Rents, Holborn, London. The book cost six shillings. (Note: Six shillings equates to approximately £33.93 in 2023, according to calculations based on the Consumer Price Index measure of inflation.) It is not known what became of Cook after the third edition was published.

== Professed Cookery ==
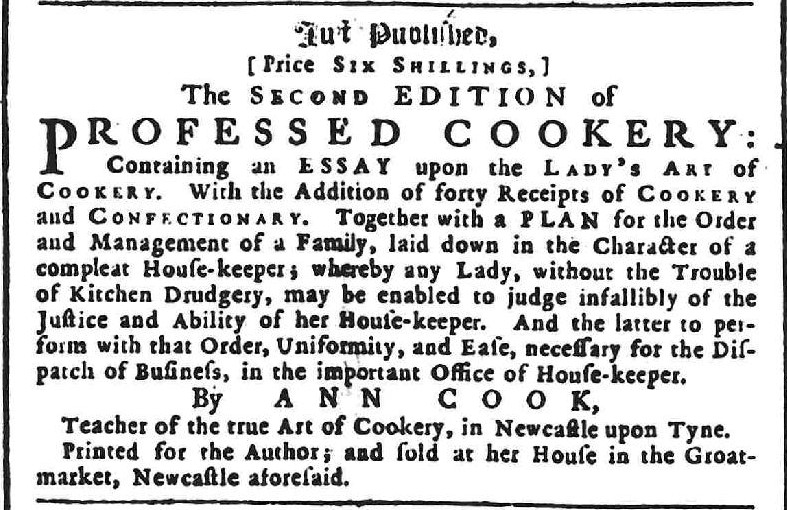
Advert for Professed Cookery, from The Newcastle Courant, 1755

The later editions of Professed Cookery cover several topics: an introduction, "To the reader"; "An Essay on the Lady's Art of Cookery", which is a critical analysis of Glasse's work The Art of Cookery Made Plain and Easy; "Professed Cookery" is the section for the recipes; and "A Plan of House-Keeping" begins as an essay on household management before moving into a biography of a friend and then an autobiography. A later edition, published in 1936 by Oxford University Press, comprises extracts of the 1760 printing and was edited by one Regula Burnet, who arranged "A Plan of House-Keeping" into further chapters and also updated the punctuation.

=== Introduction ===
The introduction ("To the reader") is written in the form of a poem, in what Lehmann describes as "appalling doggerel". Cook warns that Glasse's aim was not to educate, but "To fleece the poor low servants to get wealth / And collect surfeits to destroy all health". One part of the poem, accusing Glasse of plagiarism, reads:

She steals from ev'ry Author to her Book,
Infamously branding the pillag'd Cook,
With Trick, Booby, Juggler, Legerdemain,
Right Pages to bear up vain Glory's Train.

Glasse extensively used other sources in the book: of the 972 recipes in the first edition, at least 342 had been copied or adapted from other works without attribution. This plagiarism was typical of the time as the Statute of Anne—the 1709 Act of Parliament dealing with copyright protection—did not protect recipes from copyright infringement.

Cook does not refer to Glasse by name, but mockingly refers to her as "the lady" or "the lady teacher", and as such she ridicules the idea of a lady—of high social class—being in a position to teach cookery to a professional. Cook knew that Glasse was illegitimate, and refers to this when she rhetorically asks her readers "What Title can be due to broken Glass".

=== Essay ===
The second edition of Professed Cookery includes a chapter of criticism of Glasse's Art of Cookery, "An Essay on the Lady's Art of Cookery", which covers 66 pages. The attacks on Glasse were described by Dodds as a "violent onslaught", although much of Cook's criticism about the recipes and treatment of food is warranted, according to the social historian Jennifer Stead. Stead gives as an example Glasse's recipe for French barley pudding, which calls for one imperial quart (1,100 ml; 38 US fl oz) of cream and one-half pound (230 g) of butter for six handfuls of barley, Cook considers the result would be "a well of oil swimming upon the barley". Similarly, Glasse's recipe "To Make a Pellow" (pilaf) calls for eighteen pounds (8.2 kg) of meat and one pound (0.45 kg) of rice; Cook thinks this would have the texture of glue, as "whoever gets the rice in their mouths, 'twill stick to their teeth like bird-lime".

Although Glasse ridiculed the expense of ingredients in other cookery books, many of her own recipes are unnecessarily extravagant and wasteful according to Lehmann. A supposedly economical recipe for a cabbage (costing 1/2d) is, in Stead's words, "dressed with luxury items worth 2s 1d". (Note: 1/2d equates to approximately £0.23 and 2s 1d equates to approximately £11.76 in 2023, according to calculations based on the Consumer Price Index measure of inflation.) The resultant dish would be something no "man, woman or child, hog, sow or dog" would eat, according to Cook.

Glasse's cooking methods are also derided in Professed Cookery: the recipe which called for oysters to be larded and roasted on a spit, was mocked, as "the oysters will baste to pieces, and [it is] beyond Art to keep them on the spit". (Note: This was one step in Glasse's recipe to roast ox palates.) Similarly, the recipe "To Force a Fowl" has a fowl that has been boned and minced before being placed back in the skin and spit-roasted; according to Cook, Glasse "ought to have ordered the skin to be tanned, to enable it to stand the fire and keep its burden from falling into the dripping-pan before it is half roasted". Glasse's recipe "How to Preserve Cocks-Combs" includes instructions to add vinegar to boiling fat; Cook points out that it "would give a crack like a cannon; so that there would be no need of the chimney sweeping, for the blast would down the soot at once, and destroy the pretty supper-plate". Stead theorises that Glasse "did not fully understand or appreciate deep frying" as a cooking method, given the errors she makes in the recipes.

According to the Anglicist Andrew Monnickendam, "Cook's wit and sarcasm produce amusing moments and valid criticism, yet such heavy doses of vitriol eventually tire some readers". Stead agrees, and says the continued criticism can become tedious, although in places the criticism "has the chill elegance of a rapier thrust through her heart". Burnet thinks it "interesting and, in some places, amusing".

=== Recipes ===
Lehmann writes that Cook's recipes are more traditional than those provided by Glasse, but it is clear she was also familiar with the French sources used in The Art of Cookery, including the recipes of Vincent La Chapelle.

Professed Cookery contains recipes for fricassees, ragùs (which Cook spelled "ragoo"), collops, stews, pilafs, pasties, pies (including oyster and eel), fish dishes, potted fish and meat, soups (which she spelled "soop"), desserts, including puddings, jellies, pancakes, fritters, flummeries, possets, tarts, cakes and biscuits, preserved foods—including pickles, jams, wines and sweets—and sausages. Cook's recipes include most parts of the animal, including the intestines, cockscombs, head, heart, tongue, trotters, feet and ears and cheeks. An eleven-page index was included.

=== Household management ===
The chapter "A Plan of House-Keeping" takes the form of a narrative of Cook meeting a friend with whom she had lost touch for thirty years. Although the text does not clarify the point, Burnet considers it likely that this chapter was not written by Cook alone, but by Cook transcribing a friend's part of the story as the two women talked. Burnet sees two different dispositions behind the descriptions, with the friend being more kind and charitable than Cook, whom Burnet describes as "doubtless a very worthy woman, [who] was by nature litigious and quarrelsome. She was never happier than when she was in the middle of a stand-up fight, nor than when she was proving some one else to be in the wrong." Nevertheless, Burnet considers that "Though ... Mrs Cook is rather involved, she has a good narrative sense".

In the chapter, the text describes the stories of the lives of two friends, while interweaving instructions on their approaches and lessons on housekeeping as a domestic servant. This includes the best ways to manage servants. The instructions include information relating to the management and care of live poultry and how, by doing this properly, one can achieve the optimal flavour from the animal, and ensure the person eating has the best result. According to Monnickendam much of the description is "based on cleanliness and respect for the animal's welfare. Her ideas share many common points with ecological farming of today". Cook writes that she would rise no later than 6:00 am to look after the poultry—and two hours earlier if there was "an elegant dinner to send up". She described her approach to poultry rearing thus:

My great care was to keep the feathered flock clear of diseases, which, without great care and pains they are subject to; and to prevent distempers, I never bought chickens with their feet tied together, and stopped into baskets and creels, for this reason: the birds are confined to lie on their sides, which the stepping or trotting of the horses makes them full of bruises, and puts them into fevers.

== Historiography and legacy ==
In the 1936 edition, edited by Regula Burnet, knowledge of Cook's personal history was limited solely to Professed Cookery, with no further details known about her. When Dodds saw a copy of the 1936 edition, she was working on the history of the Allgood family and was able to identify Cook and her connection to Glasse. Dodds's research into Cook's background was published in Archaeologia Aeliana in 1938.

Professed Cookery is valued by historians of both food and social history. The work has also been used as a source for the Oxford English Dictionary and is quoted six times, for the terms "hard-boil" (in relation to eggs), "left-off" (for parts discarded), "poky" (for poking or projecting), "ribby" (for having ribs), "rock codling" (meaning "A young or small cod") and "roll" (meaning "An item of food that is rolled up").

== Notes and references ==
=== Sources ===
==== Books ====
- Aylett, Mary; Ordish, Olive (1965). First Catch Your Hare. London: Macdonald. OCLC 54053.
- Burnet, Regula (1936). Introduction. Ann Cook and Friend: With an Introduction and Notes by Regula Burnet. By Cook, Ann. London: Oxford University Press. pp. vii–xxxv. OCLC 1745604.
- Cockayne, Emily (2007). Hubbub: Filth, Noise & Stench in England 1600–1770. New Haven, Connecticut: Yale University Press. ISBN 978-0-3001-1214-6.
- Cook, Ann H. (1755). Professed Cookery. Newcastle: Self published. OCLC 1125514976.
- Cook, Ann H. (1760). Professed Cookery. London: Self published. OCLC 82699407.
- David, Elizabeth (2001) [2000]. Is There a Nutmeg in the House?. Jill Norman (ed). London: Penguin. ISBN 978-0-14-029290-9.
- Glasse, Hannah (1748). The Art of Cookery Made Plain and Easy (Third ed.). London: Published by the author. OCLC 938365682.
- Lehmann, Gilly (2003). The British Housewife: Cooking and Society in 18th-century Britain (Kindle ed.). Totnes, Devon: Prospect Books. ISBN 978-1-909248-00-7.
- Mennell, Stephen (1996). All Manners of Food: Eating and Taste in England and France from the Middle Ages to the Present. Champaign, Illinois: University of Illinois Press. ISBN 978-0-6311-3244-8.
- Monnickendam, Andrew (2010). "Food and Patriotism: The Battle of Words Between Hannah Glasse and Ann Cook". In Lamarra, Annamaria; Federici, Eleonora (eds.). Nations, Traditions and Cross-Cultural Identities: Women's Writing in English in a European Context. Bern: P. Lang. pp. 25–36. ISBN 978-3-03911-413-9.
- Snodgrass, Mary Ellen (2004). Encyclopedia of Kitchen History. Abingdon, Oxfordshire: Routledge. ISBN 978-1-135-45572-9.
- Stead, Jennifer (2002). "Quizzing Glasse, or Hannah Scrutinzed". In Davidson, Alan; Saberi, Helen (eds.). The Wilder Shores of Gastronomy: Twenty Years of the Best Food Writing From the Journal Petits Propos Culinaires. Berkeley, California: Ten Speed Press. pp. 333–352. ISBN 978-1-5800-8417-8.
- Stead, Jennifer; Bain, Priscilla (2004). Introduction. "First Catch Your Hare ...": The Art of Cookery Made Plain and Easy. By Glasse, Hannah. Totnes, Devon: Prospect. pp. v–xiv. ISBN 978-1-9030-1837-8.
- Trager, James (1996). The Food Chronology: A Food Lover's Compendium of Events and Anecdotes from Prehistory to the Present. London: Aurum Press. ISBN 978-1-8541-0399-4.
- Willan, Anne (1992). Great Cooks and their Recipes. London: Pavilion Books. ISBN 978-1-85145-596-6.
- Willan, Anne; Cherniavsky, Mark (2012). The Cookbook Library: Four Centuries of the Cooks, Writers, and Recipes That Made the Modern Cookbook. Berkeley, California: University of California Press. ISBN 978-0-520-24400-9.

==== Journals and magazines ====
- Dodds, Madeleine Hope (1938). "The Rival Cooks: Hannah Glasse and Ann Cook". Archaeologia Aeliana. 4 (15): 43–68. doi:10.5284/1059994.
- Monnickendam, Andrew (June 2019). "Ann Cook Versus Hannah Glasse: Gender, Professionalism and Readership in the Eighteenth-Century Cookbook". Journal for Eighteenth-Century Studies. 42 (2): 175–191. doi:10.1111/1754-0208.12606.

==== Websites ====
- "The Art of Cookery – Title page". British Library. Archived from the original on 25 February 2020.
- Clark, Gregory (2024). "The Annual RPI and Average Earnings for Britain, 1209 to Present (New Series)". MeasuringWorth.
- "hard-boil". Oxford English Dictionary. Oxford University Press. Archived from the original on 6 June 2024.
- Hoare, Charlotte (19 May 2014). "The Art of Cookery / by a lady". St John's College Cambridge. Archived from the original on 15 November 2023.
- "left-off". Oxford English Dictionary. Oxford University Press. Archived from the original on 6 June 2024.
- Lehmann, Gilly (2011). "Cook, Ann (fl. c. 1725–c. 1760)". Oxford Dictionary of National Biography (online ed.). Oxford University Press. doi:10.1093/ref:odnb/65131. (Subscription, Wikipedia Library access or UK public library membership required.)
- "poky". Oxford English Dictionary. Oxford University Press. Archived from the original on 6 June 2024.
- "Professed Cookery". Oxford English Dictionary. Oxford University Press. Archived from the original on 31 March 2024.
- "ribby". Oxford English Dictionary. Oxford University Press. Archived from the original on 6 June 2024.
- "rock codling". Oxford English Dictionary. Oxford University Press. Archived from the original on 7 June 2024.
- "roll". Oxford English Dictionary. Oxford University Press. Archived from the original on 6 June 2024.
