= The Art of Cookery Made Plain and Easy =

Cookbook by Hannah Glasse (1708–1770)

The Art of Cookery, Made Plain and Easy Which far exceeds any Thing of the Kind yet published
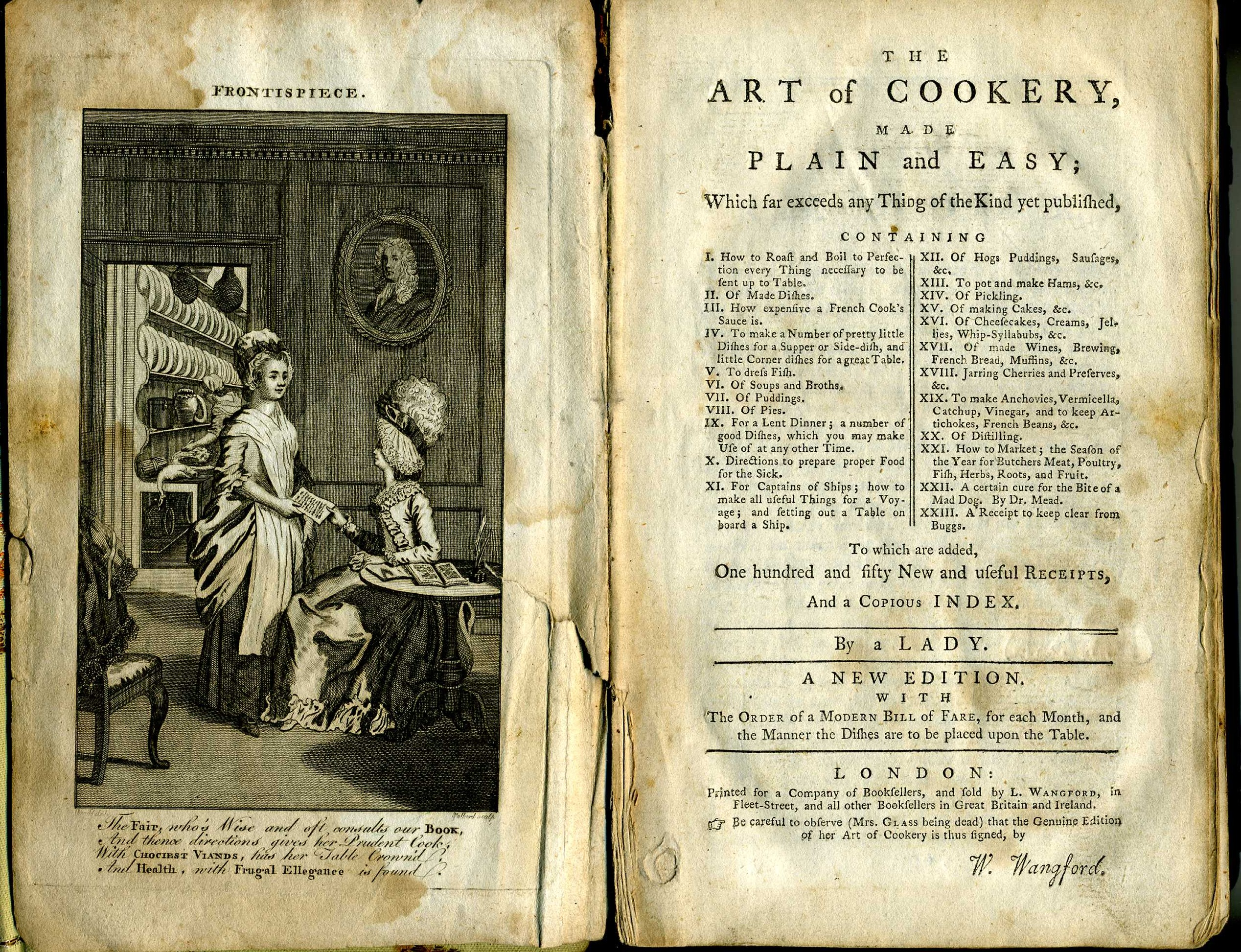
- Frontispiece and title page in an early posthumous edition, published by L. Wangford, c. 1777
- Author: "By a Lady" (Hannah Glasse)
- Language: English
- Subject: English cooking
- Genre: Cookbook
- Publisher: Hannah Glasse
- Publication date: 1747
- Publication place: England
- Pages: 384

The Art of Cookery Made Plain and Easy is a cookbook by Hannah Glasse (1708–1770), first published in 1747. It was a bestseller for a century after its first publication, dominating the English-speaking market and making Glasse one of the most famous cookbook authors of her time. The book ran through at least 40 editions, many of which were copied without explicit author consent. It was published in Dublin from 1748, and in America from 1805.

Glasse said in her note "To the Reader" that she used plain language so that servants would be able to understand it.

The 1751 edition was the first book to mention trifle with jelly as an ingredient; the 1758 edition gave the first mention of "Hamburgh sausages", piccalilli, and one of the first recipes in English for an Indian-style curry. Glasse criticised the French influence on British cuisine, but included dishes with French names and French influence in the book. Other recipes use imported ingredients including cocoa, cinnamon, nutmeg, pistachios and musk.

The book was popular in the Thirteen Colonies of America, and its appeal survived the American War of Independence; Benjamin Franklin, Thomas Jefferson and George Washington all owned copies.

== Book ==
The Art of Cookery was the dominant reference for home cooks in much of the English-speaking world in the second half of the 18th century and the early 19th century, and it is still used as a reference for food research and historical reconstruction. The book was updated significantly both during her life and after her death.

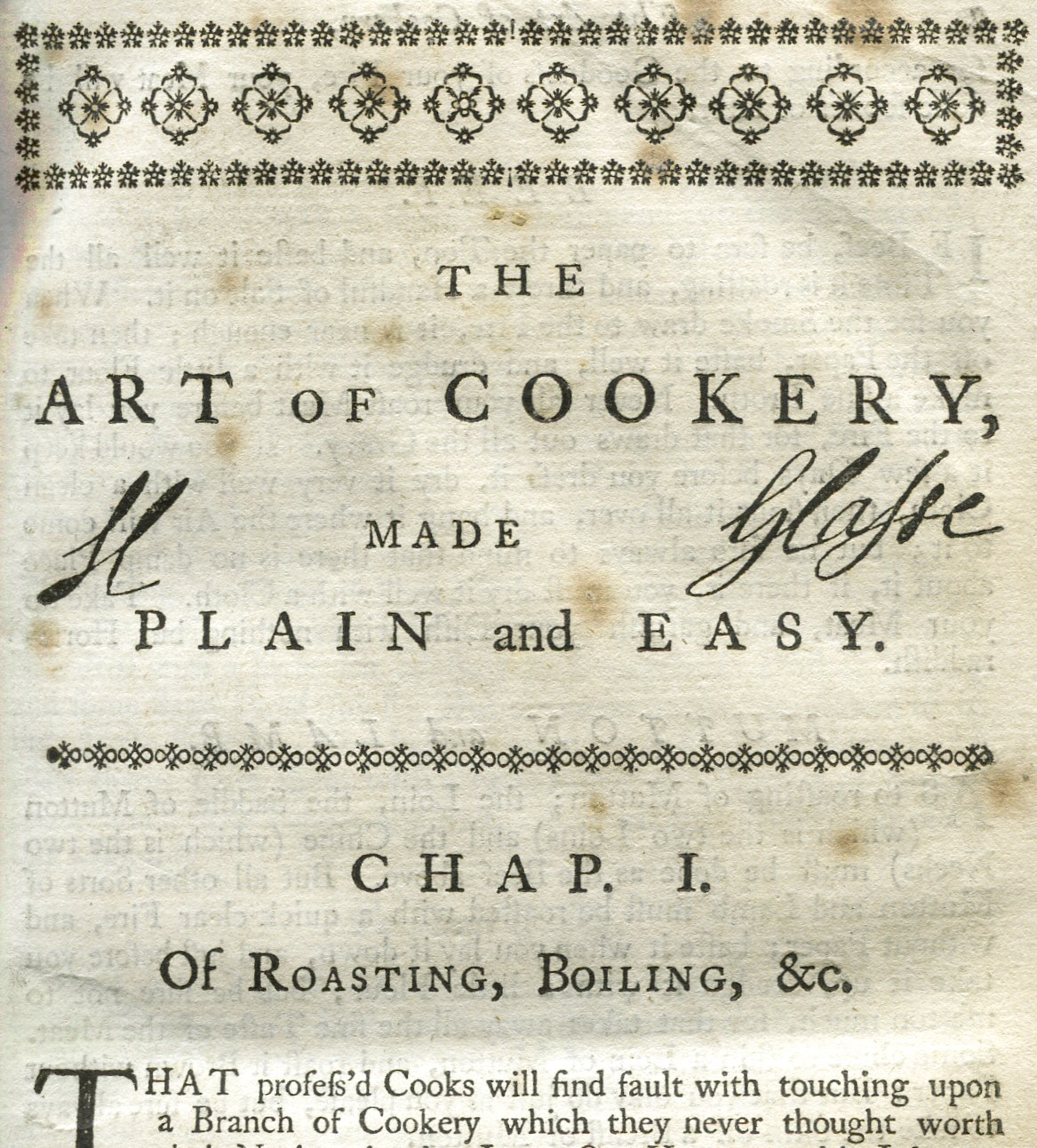
Hannah Glasse's signature at the top of the first chapter of her book, 6th Edition, 1758, an attempt to reduce plagiarism

Early editions were not illustrated. Some posthumous editions include a decorative frontispiece, with the caption:

The FAIR, who's Wise and oft consults our BOOK,
And thence directions gives her Prudent Cook,
With CHOICEST VIANDS, has her Table Crown'd,
And Health, with Frugal Ellegance is found.

Some of the recipes were plagiarised, to the extent of being reproduced verbatim from earlier books by other writers. To guard against plagiarism, the title page of, for example, the sixth edition (1758) carries at its foot the warning "This BOOK is published with his MAJESTY's Royal Licence; and whoever prints it, or any Part of it, will be prosecuted". In addition, the first page of the main text is signed in ink by the author.

The first edition of the book was published by Glasse herself, funded by subscription, and sold (to non-subscribers) at Mrs. Ashburn's China Shop.

=== Contents ===
- Chapter 1: Of Roasting, Boiling, &c.
- Chapter 2: Made Dishes.
- Chapter 3: Read this Chapter, and you will find how expensive a French Cook's Sauce is.
- Chapter 4: To make a Number of pretty little Dishes fit for a Supper, or Side-Dish, and little Corner-Dishes for a Great Table; and the rest you have in the Chapter for Lent.
- Chapter 5: Of Dressing Fish.
- Chapter 6: Of Soops and Broths.
- Chapter 7: Of Puddings.
- Chapter 8: Of Pies.
- Chapter 9: For a Fast-Dinner, a Number of good Dishes, which you may make use of for a Table at any other Time.
- Chapter 10: Directions for the Sick.
- Chapter 11: For Captains of Ships.
- Chapter 12: Of Hogs Puddings, Sausages, &c.
- Chapter 13: To pot and make Hams, &c.
- Chapter 14: Of Pickling.
- Chapter 15: Of making Cakes, &c.
- Chapter 16: Of Cheesecakes, Creams, Jellies, Whipt Syllabubs, &c.
- Chapter 17: Of Made Wines, Brewing, French Bread, Muffins, &c.
- Chapter 18: Jarring Cherries, and Preserves, &c.
- Chapter 19: To make Anchovies, Vermicella, Catchup, Vinegar; and to keep Artichokes, French Beans, &c.
- Chapter 20: Of Distilling.
- Chapter 21: How to market, and the Seasons of the Year for Butchers Meat, Poultry, Fish, Herbs, Roots, &c and Fruit.
- Chapter 22: [Against pests]
- Additions
- Contents of the Appendix.

=== Approach ===
The book has a brief table of contents on the title page, followed by a note "To the Reader", and then a full list of contents, by chapter, naming every recipe. There is a full alphabetical index at the back.

An example recipe from the book, for trifle, is written as:

To make a trifle. (Note: This recipe first appeared in the 1751 edition, making Glasse the first author to record the use of jelly in trifle.)

COVER the bottom of your dish or bowl with Naples biscuits broke in pieces, mackeroons broke in halves, and ratafia cakes. Just wet them all through with sack, then make a good boiled custard not too thick, and when cold pour it over it, then put a syllabub over that. You may garnish it with ratafia cakes, currant jelly, and flowers.

Glasse explains in her note "To the Reader" that she has written simply, "for my Intention is to instruct the lower Sort", giving the example of larding a chicken: she does not call for "large Lardoons, they would not know what I meant: But when I say they must lard with little Pieces of Bacon, they know what I mean." And she comments that "the great Cooks have such a high way of expressing themselves, that the poor Girls are at a Loss to know what they mean."

As well as simplicity, to suit her readers in the kitchen, Glasse stresses her aim of economy: "some Things [are] so extravagant, that it would be almost a Shame to make Use of them, when a Dish can be made full as good, or better, without them."

Chapters sometimes begin with a short introduction giving general advice on the topic at hand, such as cooking meat; the recipes occupy the rest of the text. The recipes give no indication of cooking time or oven temperature. There are no separate lists of ingredients: where necessary, the recipes specify quantities directly in the instructions. Many recipes do not mention quantities at all, simply instructing the cook what to do, thus:

Sauce for Larks.

LARKS, roast them, and for Sauce have Crmbs of Bread; done thus: Take a Sauce-pan or Stew-pan and some Butter; when melted, have a good Piece of Crumb of Bread, and rub it in a clean Cloth to Crumbs, then throw it into your Pan; keep stirring them about till they are Brown, then throw them into a Sieve to drain, and lay them round your Larks.

== Foreign ingredients and recipes ==
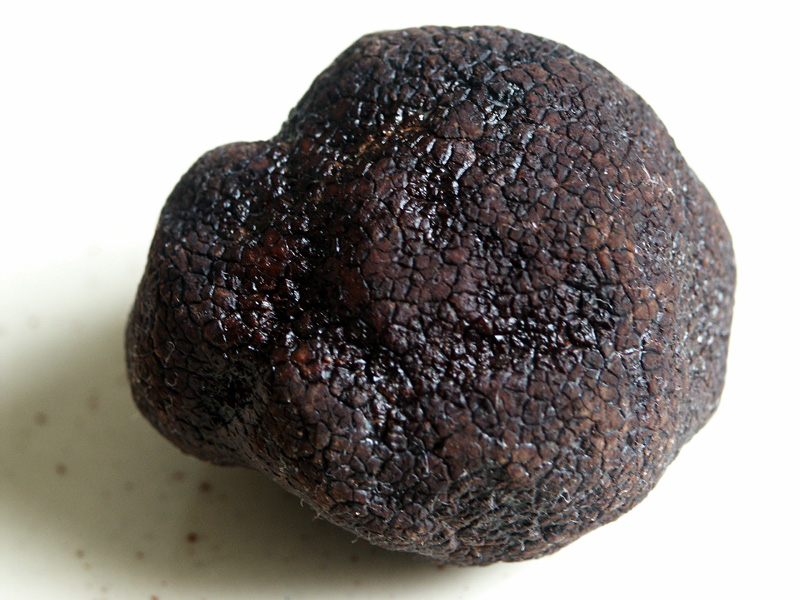
Glasse used costly truffles in some recipes.

Glasse set out her somewhat critical views of French cuisine in the book's introduction: "I have indeed given some of my Dishes French Names to distinguish them, because they are known by those names; And where there is great Variety of Dishes, and a large Table to cover, so there must be Variety of Names for them; and it matters not whether they be called by a French, Dutch, or English Name, so they are good, and done with as little Expence as the Dish will allow of." An example of such a recipe is "To à la Daube Pigeons"; a daube is a rich French meat stew from Provence, traditionally made with beef. Her "A Goose à la Mode" is served in a sauce flavoured with red wine, home-made "Catchup" (ketchup), veal sweetbread, truffles, morels, and (more ordinary) mushrooms. She occasionally uses French ingredients; "To make a rich Cake" includes "half a Pint of right French (Note: Her emphasis.) Brandy", as well as the same amount of "Sack" (Spanish sherry).

Successive editions increased the number of non-English recipes, adding German, Dutch, Indian, Italian, West Indian and American cuisines. The recipe for "Elder-Shoots, in Imitation of Bamboo" makes use of a homely ingredient to substitute for a foreign one that English travellers had encountered in the Far East. The same recipe also calls for a variety of imported spices to flavour the pickle: "an Ounce of white or red Pepper, an Ounce of Ginger sliced, a little Mace, and a few Corns of Jamaica Pepper."

There are two recipes for making chocolate, calling for costly imported ingredients like musk (an aromatic obtained from musk deer) and ambergris (a waxy substance from sperm whales), vanilla and cardamon:

Take six pounds of Cocoa-nuts, One Pound of Anniseeds, four Ounces of long Pepper, one of Cinnamon, a Quarter of a Pound of Almonds, one Pound of Pistachios, as much Achiote (Note: Achiote is the plant that yields the natural pigment annatto, still used to colour food.) as will make it the colour of Brick; three grains of Musk, and as much Ambergrease, six Pounds of Loaf-sugar, one Ounce of Nutmegs, dry and beat them, and fearce them through a fine Sieve...

== Reception ==
=== Contemporary ===
==== England ====
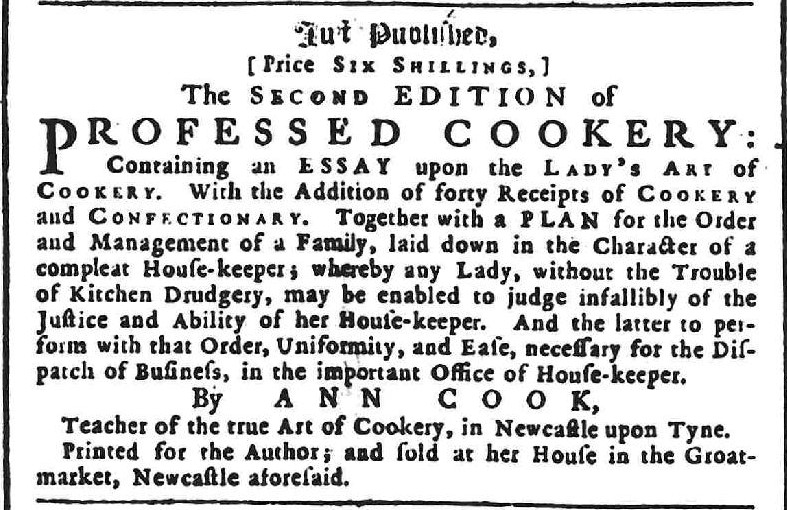
Ann Cook used the platform of her 1754 book Professed Cookery to launch an aggressive attack on The Art of Cookery.

The Art of Cookery was a bestseller for a century after its first publication, making Glasse one of the most famous cookbook authors of her time. The book was "by far the most popular cookbook in eighteenth-century Britain".

Other writers stole her work without attribution. Penelope Bradshaw's book was published in the following year claiming to be the 10th edition. This included recipes taken from Glasse's book with amounts doubled or halved to conceal the duplication.

It was rumoured for decades that despite the byline it was the work of a man, Samuel Johnson being quoted by James Boswell as observing at the publisher Charles Dilly's house that "Women can spin very well; but they cannot make a good book of cookery."

In her 1754 book Professed Cookery, Glasse's contemporary Ann Cook launched an aggressive attack on The Art of Cookery using both a doggerel poem, with couplets such as "Look at the Lady in her Title Page, How fast it sells the Book, and gulls the Age", and an essay; the poem correctly accused Glasse of plagiarism.

The Foreign Quarterly Review of 1844 commented that "there are many good receipts in the work, and it is written in a plain style." The review applauds Glasse's goal of plain language, but observes "This book has one great fault; it is disfigured by a strong anti-Galician [anti-French] prejudice."

==== Thirteen Colonies ====
The book sold extremely well in the Colonies of North America. This popularity survived the American War of Independence. A New York memoir of the 1840s declared that "We had emancipated ourselves from the sceptre of King George, but that of Hannah Glasse was extended without challenge over our fire-sides and dinner-tables, with a sway far more imperative and absolute". The first American edition of The Art of Cookery (1805) included two recipes for "Indian pudding" as well as "Several New Receipts adapted to the American Mode of Cooking", such as "Pumpkin Pie", "Cranberry Tarts" and "Maple Sugar". Benjamin Franklin is said to have had some of the recipes translated into French for his cook while he was the American ambassador in Paris. Both George Washington and Thomas Jefferson owned copies of the book.

Food critic John Hess and food historian Karen Hess have commented that the "quality and richness" of the dishes "should surprise those who believe that Americans of those days ate only Spartan frontier food", giving as examples the glass of Malaga wine, seven eggs and half a pound of butter in the pumpkin pie. They argue that while the elaborate bills of fare given for each month of the year in American editions were conspicuously wasteful, they were less so than the "interminable" menus "stuffed down" in the Victorian era, as guests were not expected to eat everything, but to choose which dishes they wanted, and "the cooking was demonstrably better in the eighteenth century."

The book contains a recipe "To make Hamburgh Sausages"; it calls for beef, suet, pepper, cloves, nutmeg, "a great Quantity of Garlick cut small", white wine vinegar, salt, a glass of red wine and a glass of rum; once mixed, this is to be stuffed "very tight" into "the largest Gut you can find", smoked for up to ten days, and then air-dried; it would keep for a year, and was "very good boiled in Peas Porridge, and roasted with toasted bread under it, or in an Amlet". The cookery writer Linda Stradley in an article on hamburgers suggests that the recipe was brought to England by German immigrants; its appearance in the first American edition may be the first time "Hamburgh" is associated with chopped meat in America.

=== Modern ===
Rose Prince, writing in The Independent, describes Glasse as "the first domestic goddess, the queen of the dinner party and the most important cookery writer to know about." She writes that Clarissa Dickson Wright "makes a good case" for giving Glasse this much credit, that Glasse had found a gap in the market, and had the distinctions of simplicity, an "appetising repertoire", and a lightness of touch. Prince quotes the food writer Bee Wilson: "She's authoritative but she is also intimate, treating you as an equal", and concludes "A perfect book, then; one that deserved the acclaim it received."

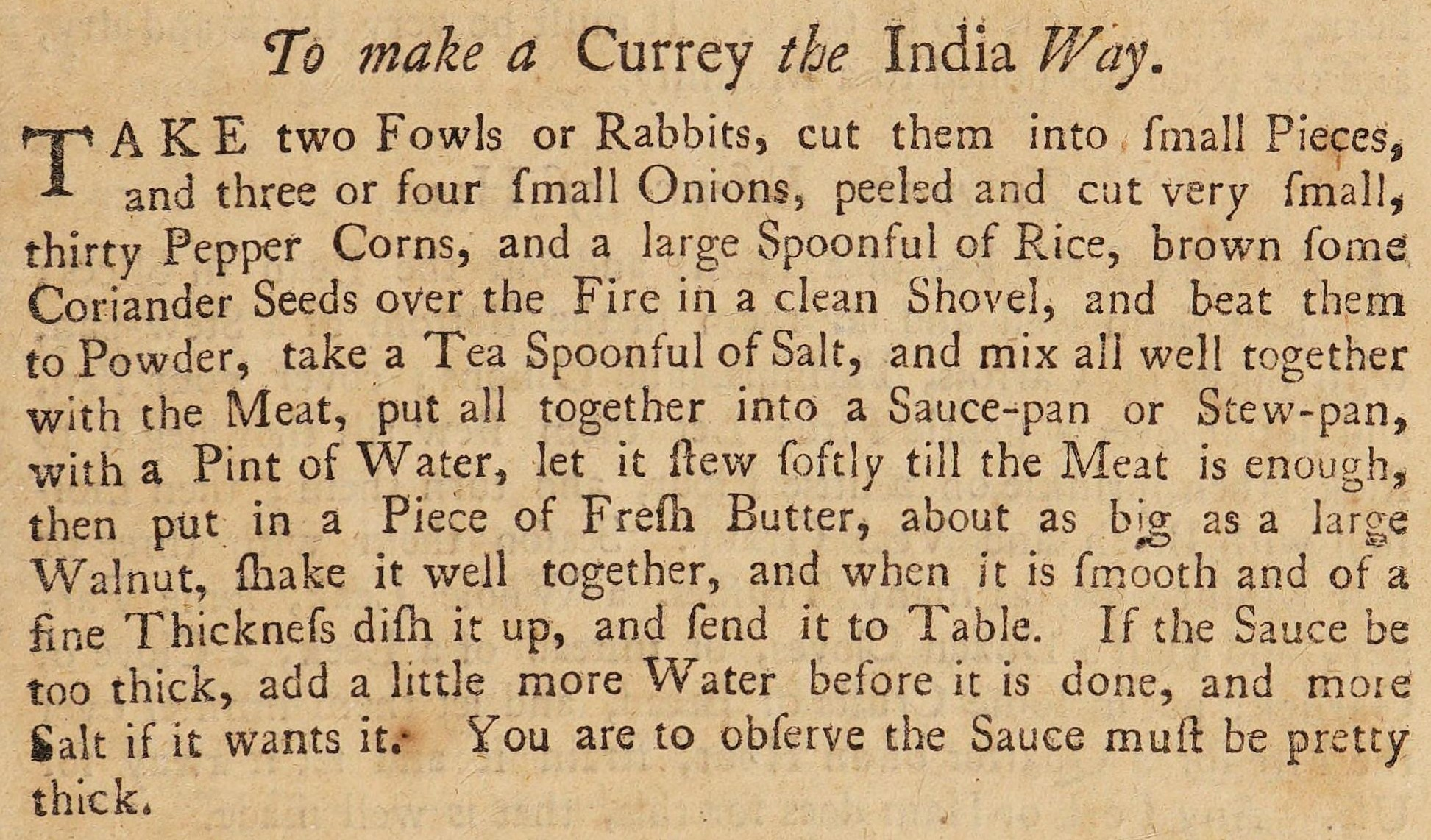
Receipt To make a Currey the India Way, 1748 3rd edition. It included black peppercorns and coriander seeds, with ginger and turmeric introduced in the 1751 4th edition. (The recipe uses the long s, "ſ").

The cookery writer Laura Kelley notes that it was one of the first books in English to include a recipe for curry: "To make a currey the India way." The recipe calls for two small chickens to be fried in butter; for ground turmeric, ginger and pepper to be added and the dish to be stewed; and for cream and lemon juice to be added just before serving. Kelley comments that "The dish is very good, but not quite a modern curry. As you can see from the title of my interpreted recipe, the modern dish most like it is an eastern (Kolkata) butter chicken. However, the Hannah Glasse curry recipe lacks a full complement of spices and the varying amounts of tomato sauce now so often used in the dish." The cookery writer Clarissa Dickson Wright calls Glass's curry a "famous recipe" and comments that she was "a bit sceptical" of this recipe, as it had few of the expected spices, but was "pleasantly surprised by the end result" which had "a very good and interesting flavour".

The historian of food Peter Brears said that the book was the first to include a recipe for Yorkshire pudding. The cookery writer Sophia Waugh said that Glasse's food was what Jane Austen and her contemporaries would have eaten.

== Legacy ==
Ian Mayes, writing in The Guardian, quotes Brewer's Dictionary of Phrase and Fable as stating "First catch your hare. This direction is generally attributed to Hannah Glasse, habit-maker to the Prince of Wales, and author of The Art of Cookery made Plain and Easy". Her actual directions are, 'Take your Hare when it is cas'd, and make a pudding...' To 'case' means to take off the skin" [not "to catch"]; Mayes notes further that both the Oxford English Dictionary and The Dictionary of National Biography discuss the attribution.

In 2015, Scott Herritt's "South End" restaurant in South Kensington, London, served some recipes from the book. The "Nourished Kitchen" website describes the effort required to translate Glasse's 18th-century recipes into modern cooking techniques.

== Editions ==
The book ran through many editions, including:

- First edition, London: Printed for the author, 1747.
- London: Printed for the author, 1748.
- Dublin: E. & J. Exshaw, 1748.
- London: Printed for the author, 1751.
- London: Printed for the author, 1755.
- Sixth edition, London: Printed for the author, sold by A. Millar, & T. Trye, 1758.
- London: A. Millar, J. and R. Tonson, W. Strahan, P. Davey and B. Law, 1760.
- Dublin: E. & J. Exshaw, 1762.
- London: A. Millar, J. and R. Tonson, W. Strahan, T. Caslon, B. Law, and A. Hamilton, 1763.
- Dublin: E. & J. Exshaw, 1764.
- London: A. Millar, J. and R. Tonson, W. Strahan, T. Caslon, T. Durham, and W. Nicoll, 1765.
- London: A. Millar and other, 1767.
- London: W. Strahan and 30 others, 1770.
- London: J. Cooke, 1772.
- Dublin: J. Exshaw, 1773.
- Edinburgh: Alexander Donaldson, 1774.
- London: W. Strahan and others, 1774.
- London: L. Wangford, c. 1775.
- London: W. Strahan and others, 1778.
- London: W. Strahan and 25 others, 1784.
- London: J. Rivington and others, 1788.
- Dublin: W. Gilbert, 1791.
- London: T. Longman and others, 1796.
- Dublin: W. Gilbert, 1796.
- Dublin: W. Gilbert, 1799.
- London: J. Johnson and 23 others, 1803.
- Alexandria, Virginia: Cottom and Stewart, 1805.
- Alexandria, Virginia: Cottom and Stewart, 1812.
- London: H. Quelch, 1828.
- London: Orlando Hodgson, 1836.
- London: J.S. Pratt, 1843.
- Aberdeen: G. Clark & Son, 1846.
- The art of cookery, made plain and easy to the understanding of every housekeeper, cook, and servant. With John Farley. Philadelphia: Franklin Court, 1978.
- "First catch your hare--" : the art of cookery made plain and easy. With Jennifer Stead, Priscilla Bain. London: Prospect, 1983.

--- Totnes: Prospect, 2004.

- Alexandria, Virginia: Applewood Books, 1997.
- Farmington Hills, Michigan: Thomson Gale, 2005.
- Mineola, New York: Dover Publications, 2015.

== See also ==
- Cajsa Warg
- François Pierre La Varenne
- Early modern European cuisine
