= Trussing needle =

Needle used for trussing poultry for cooking

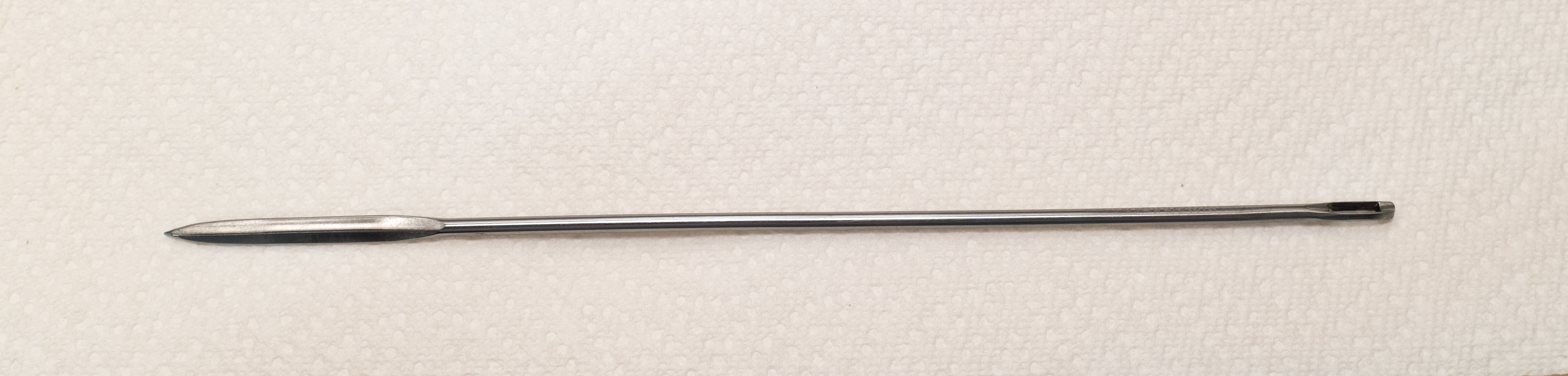
A trussing needle

A trussing needle is a needle about 20 cm long and about 3mm diameter, used for trussing (tying) poultry (such as chicken, duck, or turkey) for cooking. This is so that the bird is easier to manipulate, keep its shape, and roast evenly. A trussing needle can be used to truss more traditional poultry such as chicken or turkey, but it can also be used effectively for trussing game birds like partridge. It is also possible to truss a bird without a needle as well. There are several benefits to trussing chicken, duck, or turkey. In an untrussed bird, heat circulates in the open cavity and cooks the breasts from the inside, so they're done well before the thighs and legs. There are several different types of trussing methods which can be selected based on the type of bird and the recipe being used. One traditional trussing method employs a very long trussing needle threaded with kitchen string. This technique is used to sew up the tail vent, as well as run string through the bird from side-to-side to complete the binding. Another technique uses only a single length of kitchen string, a few simple, fluid movements, and only three knots tied along the way.

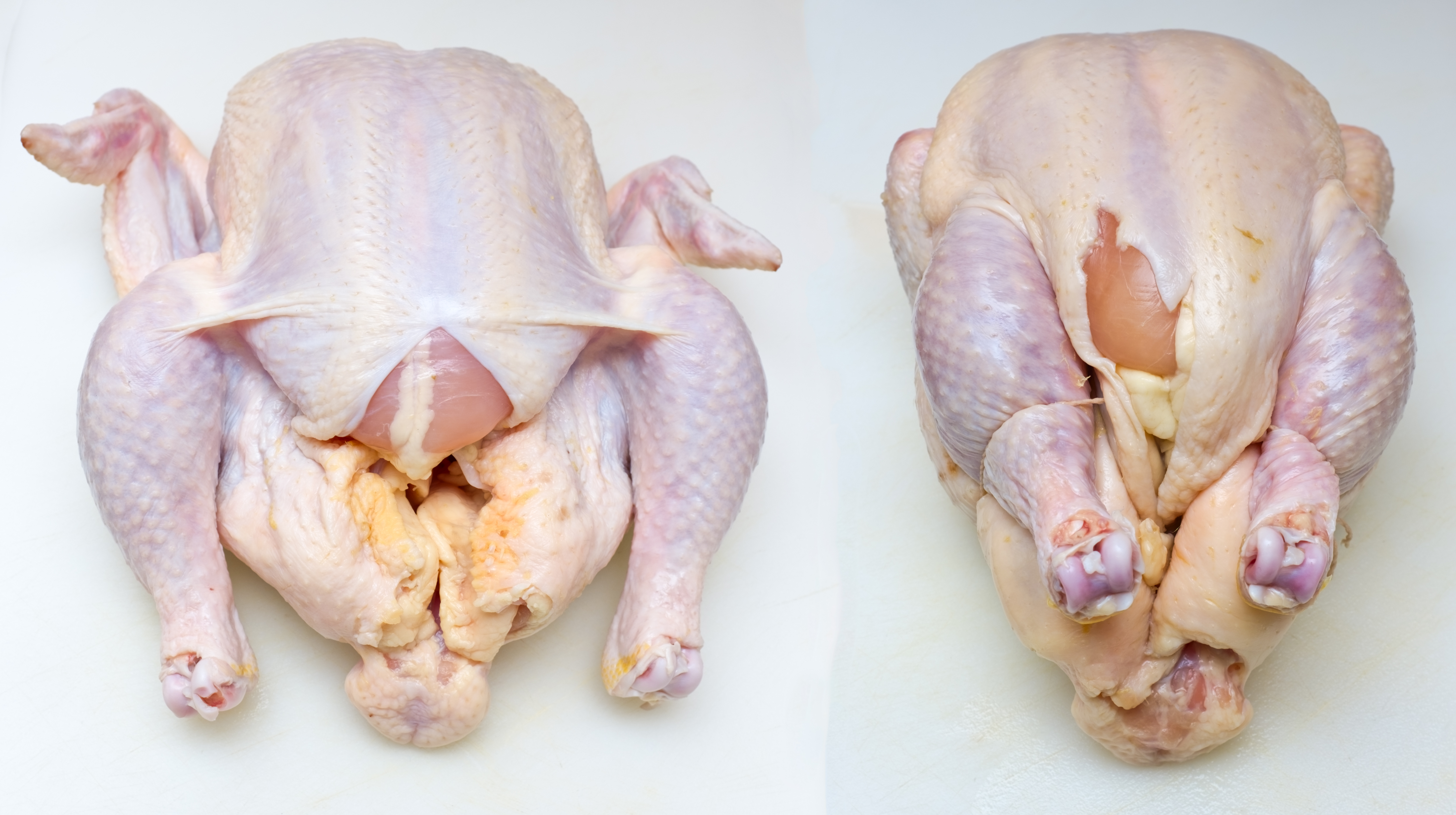
Untrussed chicken (left) and trussed chicken (right) for roasting
