= Nunwick Hall =

- Location in Northumberland

General information
- Location: Northumberland, England, UK
- Coordinates: 55.062°N 2.191°W
- OS grid: NY879741

Nunwick Hall is a privately owned 18th-century country house near Simonburn, Northumberland in North East England. The estate has been the home of the Allgood family since the 17th century. The house is a Grade II* listed building but is not open to the public.

In 1738 Lancelot Allgood married his cousin Jane Allgood, who was heiress to the Nunwick estate, and they built the present three-storey five-bayed house to a Georgian style design by architect Daniel Garrett.

Improvements made in 1829 by architect Ignatius Bonomi included a new entrance porch and east wing.

The grounds were laid out in 1760 and are protected as a Registered Historic Park and as a Grade II listed building.

The ruinous Simonburn Castle to the west was partly rebuilt as a Gothic eye-catcher or folly in 1766, to be seen from Nunwick Hall, but has since collapsed.

== High Sheriffs of Northumberland ==
Members of the Allgood family have served as High Sheriff of Northumberland:

- 1746: Lancelot Allgood of Nunwick Hall.
- 1786: James Allgood of Nunwick Hall.
- 1818: Robert Lancelot Allgood of Nunwick Hall.
- 1858: Lancelot John Hunter Allgood, of Nunwick Hall.
- 1954: Guy Hunter Allgood of Nunwick Hall, Simonsburn.
- 1984: Lancelot Guy Allgood, of Nunwick, Simonburn, Hexham.
