= Matthew Carr (artist) =

British artist

Matthew Xavier Maillard Carr (5 February 1953 – 23 February 2011) was an artist from Britain.

== Biography ==
Carr was born in Oxford. He studied at Camberwell School of Art from 1970 to 1971, followed by Cheltenham School of Art from 1972 to 1974. His father was Sir Raymond Carr, an eminent historian and Warden of St Antony's College, Oxford, and initially Carr seemed destined for an academic life by being sent to Eton College, but he left at the age of 16 to study art at Camberwell. After completing his studies at Cheltenham School of Art, Carr returned to Oxford, and began teaching art and art history, until 1977 when he persuaded his parents to allow Andy Warhol to use their house in Oxford to hold a party. In Carr's own words: 'So I met Andy Warhol, he saw the drawings I was doing, and next thing I knew he put me up at the Ritz for two days, then took me to America. And he introduced me to Robert Fraser, who became my first agent.' Carr readily admitted this was both his big break in the art world, but also the start of a problem with drug addiction as he entered the celebrity world of London and New York in the late 1970s. It was to take him twenty years to overcome his drugs addiction.

In 1988 Carr married Lady Anne Somerset, a well regarded historian and daughter of the 11th Duke of Beaufort.

Despite being well connected in the art world, Carr was an infrequent exhibitor of his work. In 1977 he exhibited alongside Hugh Dunford Wood and Sara Lutyens in Church Street, Kensington, London, and he staged his first solo show at the Robert Fraser Gallery in London in 1983. Subsequent solo shows were at the Wildenstein Gallery in London in 1993, and two shows at Marlborough Fine Art, London, in 2003 and 2008. He also showed at Marlborough Gallery in New York in 2006.

In 2006 he also took part in the exhibition Drawing Inspiration, held at the Abbot Hall Art Gallery, Kendal, an exhibition that included the artists Tony Bevan, Christopher Bramham, Patrick Caulfield, Tracey Emin, Hughie O'Donoghue and others.

Carr died of leukaemia on 23 February 2011.

== Style and influences ==
Carr worked predominantly in drawing, in a style that has affinities with highly wrought classical drawing now seen in the 'atelier art schools' in Europe and America. However Carr's work has a far greater intensity than most atelier drawing which was described by David Jenkins in the Daily Telegraph newspaper as the: 'ferocious concentration and psychological precision Carr brings to his work'.

Carr's working method could be both intense and painful. According to the art critic Richard Dorment, sitting for Carr was a difficult experience involving 'tedious hours sitting in frozen-faced silence, when, aware of eyes boring into me with frightening intensity, I listened to the scratching of pencil on paper and the ticking of my wristwatch.' Yet this led, Dorment suggested, to Carr capturing an essential humanity of the sitting in his work.

This almost forensic analysis can be seen in the way Carr would often organise images on his paper, most notably when drawing a series of twelve penises on a page, 'in alarming close-up', but also evident in his portrait heads which frequently float disembodied in the centre of the paper. In addition to Carr's study of penises, his is best known for a similar drawing showing the heads of nine rhesus monkeys, and a series of drawings of the semi-mumified human corpses in the Capuchin catacombs of Palermo.

Carr claimed to hate the picture he made of the musician Diana Ross, a rare commissioned piece, due to compromising on the singer's request to include a sunset in the background. Instead he tended to be select his models himself, often from the world of literature, Tom Stoppard, Miriam Gross, Sebastian Faulks, James Fenton, Alan Jenkins and Francis Wyndham.
