= Venusberg =

Venusberg may refer to:

- Venusberg (mythology), in German folklore, a subterranean temple of Venus
- Venusberg, Saxony, a municipality in Saxony, Germany
- Venusberg (novel), a 1932 novel by Anthony Powell
- Venusberg, a locality in the city of Bonn.
- Venusberg (film), a 1963 West German film
