= Mount of Venus =

Mount of Venus may refer to:

- Mons pubis, also called the mons veneris (mount of Venus)
- Venusberg (mythology), the mountain of Venus in European folklore
- Venus mount, a region of the hand in palmistry
- List of montes on Venus
