= Anne Somerset =

Anne Somerset may refer to:

- Anne Somerset (historian) (born 1955), English historian and writer
- Anne Somerset, Countess of Northumberland (1538–1596), English noblewoman and one of the instigators of the Northern Rebellion against Elizabeth I
- Anne Seymour, Duchess of Somerset (c. 1497 – 1587), wife of Lord Protector Somerset
