= Bramham =

Bramham may refer to:

== People ==
- Christopher Bramham (born 1952), British painter
- Sam Bramham (born 1988), Australian Paralympic swimmer
- William G. Bramham (1874–1947), American baseball executive

== Places ==
- Bramham cum Oglethorpe, a civil parish in West Yorkshire, England
  - Bramham, West Yorkshire, a village in the parish
  - Bramham Park, a historic house near the village
- Bramham Gari Matham, a pilgrimage site in Mydukur, India
- Bramham Island, British Columbia, Canada

== Other uses ==
- Battle of Bramham Moor, a battle on Bramham Moor near Wetherby
- HMS Bramham (L51), a Hunt-class destroyer of the Royal Navy
- Bramham Horse Trials, held at Bramham Park
