= Tristram Powell =

English director (1940–2024)

- Born: Tristram Roger Dymoke Powell; 25 April 1940; Oxford, Oxfordshire, England
- Died: 1 March 2024 (aged 83)
- Occupations: Director, writer, producer
- Years active: 1964–2024
- Spouse: Virginia Lucas
- Children: Georgia Somerset, Duchess of Beaufort
- Parent(s): Anthony Powell; Lady Violet Pakenham

Tristram Roger Dymoke Powell (25 April 1940 – 1 March 2024) was an English television and film director, producer and screenwriter. His credits included American Friends, episodes of series five and six of Foyle's War, and adaptations of the novels The Ghost Writer and Falling.

== Life and career ==
Tristram Powell was born in Oxford, the elder son of the novelist Anthony Powell and Lady Violet Powell (née Pakenham). His godfather was Robert Wyndham Ketton-Cremer, the last squire of Felbrigg Hall and a noted biographer. He was educated at Eton College and Trinity College, Oxford.

Powell's father died in 2000, and he has recounted the story of his conversing with the doctor in attendance, who was also surnamed Powell, about his ancestry. His mother, Lady Violet, died in 2002.

Powell objected to the National Trust's 2017 short film about his godfather, Robert Wyndham Ketton-Cremer of Felbrigg Hall in Norfolk, in which the latter's private life as a homosexual was revealed. Powell said that the Trust had made the revelation for "commercial reasons" in a way he considered "exaggerated and mean-spirited".

Powell's daughter Georgia married Henry Somerset, 12th Duke of Beaufort, in 2018.

Tristram Powell died of leukaemia on 1 March 2024, at the age of 83.

== Filmography ==
=== Director ===
Year	Film	Notes
1968	Contrasts	Episode: "A Writer and his Sword – A film about Japan's best-selling novelist, Yukio Mishima"
1978	The Lively Arts	Episode: "A Haunted Man"
1981	No Country for Old Men	(BBC Film) A Portrait of Jonathan Swift
1984	The Ghost Writer	(TV)
1985	Arena	Episode: "From an Immigrant's Notebook"
1987–1993	Screen Two	5 episodes
1988	Number 27	BBC Film Written by Michael Palin
1988	Talking Heads	Episode: "Soldiering On"
1991	American Friends	
1992	The Old Devils	Episodes: "Love, Lust and Litre Bottles", "Rhiannon's Boys", "Clapped-Out Casanovas"
1993	Selected Exits	(TV)
1995	Tears Before Bedtime	4 episodes
1997	Drovers' Gold	TV mini-series
1997–1999	Kavanagh QC	Episodes: "Ancient History", "Previous Convictions", "End Game"
1998	Talking Heads 2	Episode: "Nights in the Gardens of Spain"
2000	Telling Tales	
2000	Without Motive	3 episodes
2001	Anybody's Nightmare	(TV)
2003	Sparkling Cyanide	(TV)
2005	Falling	(TV)
2005–2006	Judge John Deed	Episodes: "In Defence of Others", "My Daughter, Right or Wrong"
2005–2008	Trial & Retribution	Episodes: "The Lovers: Part 1", "Curriculum Vitae: Part 1", "Tracks: Part 1"
2006	The Commander	Episode: "Blacklight"
2007–2008	Foyle's War	Episodes: "Casualties of War", "Plan of Attack", "All Clear"
2009	Law & Order: UK	Episode: "Paradise"
