= Venusberg (novel) =

1932 novel by Anthony Powell

- First edition cover
- Author: Anthony Powell
- Cover artist: Misha Black
- Language: English
- Genre: Comedy; Satire
- Published: 1932 (Duckworth) (Hardcover); 1961 (Penguin Books) (Paperback)
- Publication place: United Kingdom
- Pages: 253 (Hardcover edition)
- Preceded by: Afternoon Men (1931)
- Followed by: From a View to a Death (1933)

Venusberg is the second novel by the English writer Anthony Powell. Published in 1932, the story centers around English journalist Lushington's experiences as a foreign correspondent in an unidentified Baltic country's capital. He encounters characters of various backgrounds who spend most of their time at parties.

The novel continues Powell's use of social comedy, this time with a primarily cosmopolitan setting, compared to the English one of his first novel, Afternoon Men. Romantic entanglements and the dissatisfactions of love remain a major concern and the novel maintains Powell's characteristic mingling of comedy and embarrassment. Of Powell's novels, Venusberg makes the greatest use of short chapters and quick changes of scene in the plot.

The title is derived from the mythological location of Venusberg that features in the legend of Tannhäuser. Powell uses a quotation from a Baedeker travel guide as an epigraph:

"Here, according to popular tradition, is situated the grotto of Venus, into which she enticed the knight Tannhäuser; fine view from the top."

In 1956, the BBC aired an adaptation for radio, created and produced by Christopher Sykes.

== Plot summary ==
Dissatisfied with life in London, and struggling with the unrequited love he feels for a woman named Lucy, Lushington, a journalist, secures a posting in the Baltic. The job is in an unnamed city, in which a friend of his, Da Costa, the man with whom Lucy is in love, is already living and working as an honorary attaché. Onboard the ship he meets and becomes entangled with several of the characters who feature prominently throughout the novel, including Frau Ortrud Mavrin, with whom he begins an affair, and the Russian Counts Scherbatcheff and Bobel.

Lushington is soon introduced to the high society of the city, and continues to meet Ortrud. He meets various diplomats, representatives of the State Police, the intrusive valet, Pope (whose name ironically recalls the role played by the Pope in the Tannhäuser legend), the American diplomat Curtis Cortney, and Ortrud's husband and son.

Count Scherbatcheff takes Lushington to his home in the outskirts of the city, where Bolshevik refugees live in ramshackle houses. Scherbatcheff introduces Lushington to his family, who are depressed. Scherbatcheff's grandmother initially refuses to be hospitable to Lushington, believing that he wishes to sleep on the couch. Once Scherbatcheff clarifies Lushington's identity, she welcomes him. Scherbatcheff discloses his love for Ortrud to Lushington, and requests that Lushington mention his name to her.

Da Costa decides to take Lushington and Cortney on an inland skiing trip. At the hotel, they meet Count Scherbatcheff, who is there on the recommendation of his doctor as a remedy for his poor health. Cortney suggests that at a party a few nights earlier, Ortrud displayed interest in another man; Lushington vehemently disagrees.

Lushington waits in his hotel room for the Bellamys, the English chargé d'affaires. Whilst he is waiting, Ortrud comes to his hotel room, and suggests that he cancel his plans with them to spend the night with her, but he declines. She leaves, and shortly after, Da Costa enters, and Lushington invites him to stay and have a drink with the Bellamys. Da Costa declines and leaves. After he leaves, Count Bobel arrives with two girls, and invites Lushington to take a trip with them into the country. Lushington, embarrassed by the thought of the Bellamys seeing him in the company of the bothersome Bobel, persuades the Count to leave by suggesting that he has interrupted him in the act of making love.

Count Scherbatcheff dies of his illness and Lushington attends the funeral. After the funeral, Lushington goes for a walk with Professor Mavrin, Ortrud's husband. The Professor discloses that he believes that Ortrud's recent irrational behaviour is on account of her being in love with Da Costa. Lushington is surprised, knowing himself to be the one she is in love with; nevertheless, he assures the Professor of Da Costa's relative disinterest in women. They then visit the museum, where they run into Da Costa, who discusses his morose thoughts of his own mortality brought about by Scherbatcheff's death.

Lushington attends a large ball, where most of the diplomats, politicians, and military officials of the city are in attendance. Ortrud and Lushington discuss their love for one another and their disappointment at Lushington's imminent return to England. Da Costa offers to take Ortrud home, and Lushington returns to his hotel. Shortly after, he is woken by a phone call from Pope, requesting his presence at Da Costa's room. There, he is informed that Da Costa and Ortrud were both killed as they were caught in the crossfire of an attempted political assassination.

Lushington returns to England by boat, where Count Bobel is the only other passenger. Once back in London, he meets Lucy, who, after learning of Da Costa's death, suggests that now they only have each other.

== Major Themes ==
Venusberg examines romance through Lushington's relationships with his two love interests, Lucy and Ortura, and the uninterested but attractive Da Costa. It is not a saccharine love story, however, as James Tucker writes, because even though Lushington "gets the girl" (Lucy), the contrast of the deaths of Da Costa and Ortrud and the reticent closing dialogue means the novel does not provide any sentimental fulfilment. Writing for The New Yorker, Anthony West considered Powell's use of humor the key to the central "painful love affair" not being overly sentimental. West describes the novel as comically dismissing trivial aspects of life such as politics in favour of an intimate "anatomy of weakness" and portrayal of the workings of love and friendships.

Powell also uses irony to suggest a philosophy of fatalism. Tucker opines this is particularly observable in the character of Count Scherbatcheff, who, upon drawing a death card, erroneously believes that it portends the death of his grandmother; and that of Professor Mavrin, who despite being a psychologist, incorrectly attributes Ortrud's rash behaviour to her being in love with Da Costa. Professor Mavrin's disclosure of his suspicion places Lushington as a "spectator of his own affair", emphasizing the impotence of characters in the face of their own circumstances. Tucker suggests that Powell could be criticized for over-relying on irony throughout the novel, and at times risks falling into glib wryness and a foreseeable deus ex machina. Despite this, he argues that Venusberg is a controlled combination of sensitivity and farce that set up the approaches that Powell would further refine in his major work, the novel series A Dance to the Music of Time.
