= What's Become of Waring =

1939 novel by Anthony Powell

First edition (publ. Cassell)

What's Become of Waring is the fifth novel by the English writer Anthony Powell. It is his final novel of the 1930s, and the only one not published by Powell's first employer and publisher, Duckworth. Published in 1939, Powell's book was overshadowed by international events, limiting sales. Nonetheless, it marks a significant step in Powell's development, anticipating his masterpiece, A Dance to the Music of Time, via the introduction of the self-effacing first-person narrator. The title of the book is also the first line of the poem Waring by Robert Browning.

== Plot introduction ==
What’s Become of Waring is set in large part in the publishing firm of Judkins and Judkins, and informed by Powell's experiences with both Duckworth and Warner Brothers. Dinner parties and seances abound, featuring unusual and uncomfortable mixtures of guests. Coincidence, often noted as a significant feature of Dance, here plays a larger role than in any of Powell's other early fiction. The novel shows clearly the relative thinness of the curtain of civility with which society wraps itself and how easily that fabric frays.

== Plot summary ==
The novel is narrated by an anonymous publishing firm employee, who is himself working on a book about Stendhal and violence. At a seance, an apparent warning is received that something is wrong with bestselling travel writer, T.T. Waring. Waring, anticipating Thomas Pynchon in his insistence on privacy and anonymity, is soon confirmed dead. Through various efforts to bring out an official life of Waring, many secrets are slowly revealed, especially concerning Waring's identity and the sources of his travel literature.

The inner workings and tensions of the publishing business (in which Powell was himself employed for about a decade) and the assortment of individuals brought together through a shared interest in spiritualism provide many opportunities for developing conflicting personal desires amongst the various characters. The novel ends with a series of comic reversals, not untinged with melancholy, and the narrator's realization that most of life involves the pursuit of power.

What's Become of Waring is dedicated to Edith Sitwell.
