= Elizabeth David bibliography =

Elizabeth David, the British cookery writer, published eight books in the 34 years between 1950 and 1984; the last was issued eight years before her death. After David's death, her literary executor, Jill Norman, supervised the publication of eight more books, drawing on David's unpublished manuscripts and research and on her published writings for books and magazines.

David's first five books, particularly the earlier works, contained recipes interspersed with literary quotation and descriptions of people and places that inspired her. By the time of her third book, Italian Food, David had begun to add sections about the history of the cuisine and the particular dishes that she wrote about. Her interest in the history of cooking led her in her later years to research the history of spices, baking, and ice.

Many of the recipes in David's early books were revised versions of her articles previously published in magazines and newspapers, and in An Omelette and a Glass of Wine (1984) she collected her favourites among her articles and presented them unedited with her afterthoughts appended. A second volume of reprinted articles was published after her death. David's biographer, Artemis Cooper, wrote, "She was hailed not only as Britain's foremost writer on food and cookery, but as the woman who had transformed the eating habits of middle-class England."

== Background ==
David's interest in cooking was sparked by a 21st birthday gift from her mother of The Gentle Art of Cookery by Hilda Leyel, her first cookery book. She later wrote, "I wonder if I would have ever learned to cook at all if I had been given a routine Mrs Beeton to learn from, instead of the romantic Mrs Leyel with her rather wild, imagination-catching recipes."

In 1938, David and a boyfriend travelled through France to Antibes, where she met and became greatly influenced by the ageing writer Norman Douglas, about whom she later wrote extensively. He inspired her love of the Mediterranean, encouraged her interest in good food, and taught her to "search out the best, insist on it, and reject all that was bogus and second-rate." She continued her exploration of Mediterranean food and the use of fresh, local ingredients in Greece in 1940. When the Germans invaded Greece in April 1941, she fled to Egypt. There, she and her employer engaged a Greek cook who, she wrote, produced magnificent food: "The flavour of that octopus stew, the rich wine dark sauce and the aroma of mountain herbs was something not easily forgotten." In 1942, she moved to Cairo, where she was asked to set up and run the Ministry of Information's reference library. The library was open to everyone and was much in demand by journalists and other writers. She employed a Sudanese suffragi (a cook-housekeeper) of whom she recalled:

Suleiman performed minor miracles with two Primus stoves and an oven which was little more than a tin box perched on top of them. His soufflés were never less than successful. … For three or four years I lived mainly on rather rough but highly flavoured colourful shining vegetable dishes, lentil or fresh tomato soups, delicious spiced pilaffs, lamb kebabs grilled over charcoal, salads with cool mint-flavoured yoghurt dressings, the Egyptian fellahin dish of black beans with olive oil and lemon and hard-boiled eggs – these things were not only attractive but also cheap."

Returning to England after the Second World War and her years of access to superior cooking and a profusion of fresh ingredients, David encountered terrible food: "There was flour and water soup seasoned solely with pepper; bread and gristle rissoles; dehydrated onions and carrots; corned beef toad in the hole. I need not go on." Partly to earn some money, and partly from an "agonized craving for the sun", David began writing articles on Mediterranean cookery. Her first efforts were published in 1949 in the British magazine Harper's Bazaar. From the outset, David refused to sell the copyright of her articles, and so she was able to collect and edit them for publication in book form. Even before all the articles had been published, she had assembled them into a typescript volume called A Book of Mediterranean Food.

The success of David's books put her in great demand by magazine editors. Among the publications for whom she regularly wrote for some period were Vogue magazine, The Sunday Times and The Spectator.

== A Book of Mediterranean Food (1950) ==

David's first book, A Book of Mediterranean Food, frequently referred to by the abbreviated title of Mediterranean Food, was published by John Lehmann in 1950, only a year after David's first articles had started appearing in British periodicals. The original typescript of the book consisted almost entirely of reused versions of her recent articles. It was submitted to and turned down by a series of publishers, one of whom told her that it needed something more than just the bare recipes. David took note, and wrote some linking text, interspersing her own brief prose with relevant excerpts from a wide range of authors known for their writings about the Mediterranean. They included Norman Douglas, Lawrence Durrell, Gertrude Stein, D. H. Lawrence, Osbert Sitwell, Compton Mackenzie, Arnold Bennett, Henry James and Théophile Gautier.

Lehmann accepted the work for publication, and gave David an advance of £100. He commissioned a dust-jacket painting and black and white illustrations from the artist John Minton. Writers including Cyril Ray and John Arlott commented that Minton's drawings added to the attractions of the book. David thought good illustration important. Although she did not like Minton's black and white drawings, she described his jacket design as "stunning". She was especially taken with "his beautiful Mediterranean bay, his tables spread with white cloths and bright fruit" and the way that "pitchers and jugs and bottles of wine could be seen far down the street."

The book appeared when food rationing imposed during the Second World War remained fully in force in Britain. As David later put it, "almost every essential ingredient of good cooking was either rationed or unobtainable." She therefore adapted some of the recipes she had learned in the years when she lived in Mediterranean countries, "to make up for lack of flavour which should have been supplied by meat or stock or butter." The Times Literary Supplement observed, "while one might hesitate to attempt 'Lobster à la Enfant Prodigue' (with champagne, garlic, basil, lemon, chervil, mushrooms and truffles), the resourceful cook with time to explore London's more individual shops, and money, should not often be nonplussed." The Observer commented that the book deserved "to become the familiar companion of all who seek uninhibited excitement in the kitchen."

The chapters of Mediterranean Food dealt with: soups; eggs and luncheon dishes; fish; meat; substantial dishes; poultry and game; vegetables; cold food and salads; sweets; jams, chutneys and preserves; and sauces. The book was reprinted in 1951; an American edition was published by Horizon Press in 1952; and a paperback edition was published by Penguin Books in 1955. In 1956, David revised the work, which was published by Penguin. Translations have been published in Danish and Chinese. In 2009, the Folio Society published an edition with an introduction by Julian Barnes and colour illustrations by Sophie MacCarthy together with Minton's original black and white illustrations.

== French Country Cooking (1951) ==
In this book, David acknowledged her debt to books published in French, by Edmond Richardin, Austin De Croze, Marthe Daudet (1878–1960) known as Pampille, and J. B. Reboul. French Country Cooking drew less on David's magazine articles than its predecessor, although one of her best known and most influential chapters, "Wine in the kitchen", was reprinted from an article written for a wine merchant.

The main text of the book begins with "Batterie de cuisine", a serious and thorough examination of the equipment that David thought necessary in a good kitchen. Many of the items she mentioned were not widely available in England in the 1950s, such as moulinettes for puréeing, mandolines for slicing vegetables, hâchoires (or mezzalunas) for chopping. The second section of the book is "Wine in the kitchen", which opens:

Nobody has ever been able to find out why the English regard a glass of wine added to a soup or stew as a reckless and foreign extravagance and at the same time spend pounds on bottled sauces, gravy powders, soup cubes, ketchups and artificial flavourings. If every kitchen contained a bottle each of red wine, white wine and inexpensive port for cooking, hundreds of store cupboards could be swept clean for ever of the cluttering debris of commercial sauce bottles and all synthetic aids to flavouring.

The remaining chapters of the book follow the pattern of Mediterranean Food: soups; fish; eggs; luncheon, supper and family dishes; meat; poultry; game; vegetables; salads; sweets; sauces; and preserves.

The Manchester Guardian classified the book as more ornamental than useful, a book to make "good reading" rather than "good cooks". Its reviewer, Lucie Marion, took issue with many of David's recipes: "I cannot think that Mrs. David has actually tried to make many of the dishes for which she gives recipes." The Observer, by contrast, considered French Country Cooking "of outstanding merit. The book is eminently practical … its directions are so lucid that the reader might be receiving a concrete demonstration."

As with Mediterranean Food, a second edition was soon called for. By 1956, the book had been reprinted six times in the UK and published in the US. In 1958, David responded to the improved availability in Britain of good ingredients by revising the work, eliminating sections on specialist suppliers, to whom by 1958 it was no longer necessary to resort. In the second edition David also applied second thoughts, eliminating "a few of the longer and more elaborate recipes".

== Italian Food (1954) ==
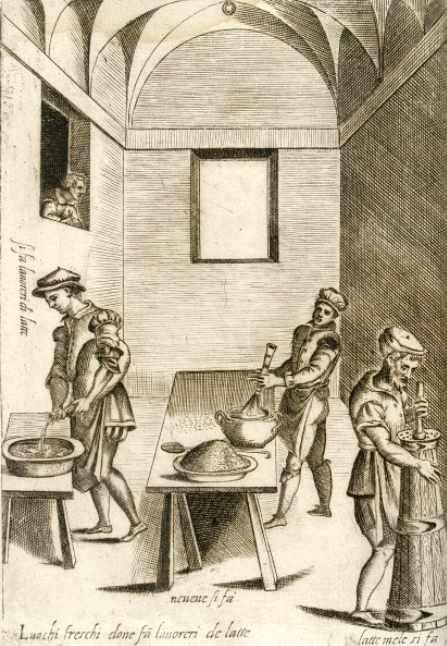
In addition to Renato Guttuso's drawings, Italian Food reproduced illustrations of medieval cookery by Bartolomeo Scappi (1570)

David's third book differed from its predecessors in that it drew little from anything she had already written. She spent many months in Italy researching it before starting work on the typescript. While she was away, the firm of her publisher, John Lehman, was closed down by its principal shareholder, and she found herself under contract to the far less congenial company, Macdonald.

While in Venice during her culinary tour of Italy, David met the artist Renato Guttuso. They struck up a friendship, and he agreed to illustrate her book, which he did, despite the very small fee offered by David's publisher. With two successful books already published, David felt less in need of extracts from earlier writers to bolster her own prose. The Times Literary Supplement said, "More than a collection of recipes, this is book is in effect a readable and discerning dissertation on Italian food and regional dishes, and their preparation in the English kitchen. The text is divided into kinds of food, with chapters on rice, pasta and Italian wines." In The Observer, Freya Stark wrote, "Mrs. David … may be counted among the benefactors of humanity." In The Sunday Times, Evelyn Waugh named Italian Food as one of the two books that had given him the most pleasure in that year. In 2009, Sir Terence Conran called it "the very best book about Italian food that has ever been published here".

Italian Food begins with a chapter on "The Italian store cupboard", giving British cooks, who at that time were generally unacquainted with most of Italy's cuisine and methods, an insight into Italian herbs, spices, tinned, bottled or dried staples including anchovies, tuna, funghi, prosciutto, and chickpeas, and Italian essentials such as garlic and olive oil, both seldom seen in Britain in the early 1950s. The rest of the book follows the basic pattern of the earlier works, with chapters on soups, fish, meat, vegetables and sweets, with the addition of extra subjects relevant to Italian food, pasta asciuta, ravioli and gnocchi, rice, and Italian wine. In a description of the 2009 edition, the publisher wrote:

Even in the 1963 edition Elizabeth David felt the need to explain that a courgette was "a tiny marrow" and lamented the difficulty of finding basil and pine nuts. Yet she refused to participate in what she called the "censorship" of assuming English cooks were too timid or stupid to try anything different; she included recipes for wood pigeon and squid-ink pasta alongside aromatic marinades, wholesome soups and delicious breads. … [British] supermarket aisles were not always filled with packets of fresh herbs, dried porcini and regional olive oils. Elizabeth David was among those responsible for the change, because she inspired a generation with her own curiosity and appreciation for the mouth-watering variety of authentic Italian food.

The first American edition was published by Alfred A. Knopf in 1958, after much argument between the head of the company, Alfred Knopf, and the author. Knopf wanted to drop the Guttuso illustrations and rewrite the text for an American audience; David refused, and Knopf eventually gave way. David revised the book for its first Penguin edition in 1963, made further minor revisions for reprints in 1969 and 1977 and revised it again, more extensively, for the 1987 edition, published in hardback by Barrie and Jenkins and, in 1989, by Penguin in paperback. In 2009, the Folio Society published an edition with new illustrations by Sophie MacCarthy and an introduction by Sir Terence Conran.

== Summer Cooking (1955) ==
This, David's fourth book, reverted to some extent to the pattern of the first two, drawing extensively on her articles previously published in magazines. She had severed her ties with the publishers Macdonalds, who had acquired the publishing rights to her first three books when her original publisher was forced out of business. Her new publisher was the Museum Press of London. The illustrations were by Adrian Daintrey.

In her introduction, David wrote:

By summer cookery I do not necessarily mean cold food; although cold dishes are always agreeable in summer at most meals, however hot the weather, one hot dish is welcome, but it should be a light one, such as a very simply cooked sole, an omelette, a soup of the young vegetables which are in season – something fresh which provides at the same time a change, a new outlook.

Summer Cooking reflected David's strong belief in eating food in season; she loved "the pleasure of rediscovering each season's vegetables" and thought it "rather dull to eat the same food all year round." Unconstrained by the geographical agendas of her first three books, David wrote about dishes from Britain, India, Mauritius, Russia, Spain and Turkey, as well as France, Italy and Greece. Reviewing the first edition, The Observer said:

Men who pretend to know about it can be more pretentiously precious over cooking than almost anything else. Thank heavens that the women are at last beginning to put them right. The latest blow at food in fancy dress and out of season (a male weakness from Apicius to Escoffier) is Elizabeth David's forthright Summer Cooking. … For her food has more to do with the seasons, the sea and the countryside than with tin and deep freeze, and cooking concerns saucepan, fire and flavour rather than pretty picture colour patterns. The book is a tonic whether you dabble nervously in the kitchen or have "views" on cooking.

In addition to those subjects like soups, fish and meat common to all her books to date, David included chapters about hors d'oeuvre and salads, preserves, buffet food, and "Improvised cooking for holidays". Among her recipes are asparagus with Parmesan cheese, cold roast duck on a bed of fresh mint, paupiettes of sole in lettuce leaves, broad beans with bacon, and aubergines à la Provençale.

David revised the book for a second edition, published in the UK and the U.S. by Penguin Books. Translations were published in Italian in 1975 and Danish in 1980. David further revised and enlarged the book for a third edition, published by Penguin in 1987. In 2009 the Folio Society published an edition with new illustrations by Sophie MacCarthy and an introduction by Rose Prince.

== French Provincial Cooking (1960) ==
The fifth, and last, of David's volumes consisting primarily of recipes is by far the longest of them. The 1970 paperback edition published by Penguin Books runs to 584 pages. David's biographer Artemis Cooper describes it as "a book that only needed assembling", because it was based on previously published articles and her own collection of notes and recipes from the previous two decades. David researched her recipes thoroughly, and whenever several supposedly classic and mutually contradictory recipes existed she "knew how to reduce a recipe to its bare essentials, and then reconstruct it". By the 1960s, she was described in the British press as "the most revered goddess of cooking", and The Observer said, "It is difficult to think of any home that can do without Elizabeth David's French Provincial Cooking.

The layout of the book follows that of the earlier volumes, with the recipes grouped by subject. Each chapter has its own introductory essay, up to four pages in length, and within each chapter sub-sections also have their own preliminary essays; for instance, the chapter on meat has a two-page opening essay, with individual essays on beef, lamb, pork and veal before the recipes for each.

The Folio Society, which published a new edition of the book in 2008, wrote, "French Provincial Cooking is considered to be the crowning achievement of Elizabeth David's career, incorporating exquisite recipes from great chefs alongside those gathered from local cooks and one of the finest bibliographies of good cookery books ever compiled." The bibliography runs to 16 pages, and ranges from 18th-century French cookery books beginning with Le Ménage des champs et le jardinier français (1711) and ending with modern works by Simone Beck, Louisette Bertholle and Julia Child, and Jane Grigson.

A typical example of David's approach in this book is her section on pot-au-feu, which covers six pages, with sub-sections on the choice of meat, the vegetables, the saucepan, quantities, preparation, cooking, serving, using leftovers, and regional variations of the dish.

The Times Literary Supplement commented, "French Provincial Cooking needs to be read rather than referred to quickly. It discourses at some length the type and origin of the dishes popular in various French regions, as well as the culinary terms, herbs and kitchen equipment used in France. But those who can give the extra time to this book will be well repaid by dishes such as La Bourride de Charles Bérot and Cassoulet Colombié," (respectively, a Provençal dish of fillets of white fish in an aïoli and cream sauce, and a Languedoc casserole of beans with pork, mutton, sausage and goose.) Reviewing the 1977 edition, The Times called it "arguably the most influential cookery book of our age, one which brought food writing into the realms of literature."

The first edition, illustrated by Juliet Renny, was published by Michael Joseph, with a simultaneous paperback issue by Penguin Books. The first American edition was published by Harper and Row in 1962. A revised edition was published by Michael Joseph in 1965 and by Penguin in 1967. Further reprints with minor revisions followed in 1969, 1970, 1977, 1981, 1984, 1986 and 1997. A new edition was published by Penguin in 1998 (London) and 1999 (New York). A Portuguese translation Cozinha francesa regional was published in 2000. The Folio Society issued a new edition in 2008, with illustrations by Sophie MacCarthy in addition to the originals by Renny.

== Spices, Salt and Aromatics in the English Kitchen (1970) ==
The book is in two parts. David wrote the first four chapters, "Spices and Condiments," "Aromatic Herbs, Dried or Fresh," "More Flavourings" and "Measurements and Temperatures" specifically for the book, drawing on an earlier pamphlet, Dried Herbs, Aromatics and Condiments, written in 1967 for sale in her kitchen shop. In these chapters, David writes about the background of the herbs and spices and condiments that came into use in British kitchens over the previous centuries, and sketches the history of their adoption from Asia and continental Europe. The Times Literary Supplement called this part of the book "as difficult to put down as a good thriller." In 2018 the chef Jeremy Lee called it, "The most incredibly sophisticated compendium of all that is good in British cooking".

In the longer second part of the book, David gives recipes for such dishes as spiced beef, smoked fish, cured pork and sweet fruit pickles. Not all use unfamiliar spices: her "Sussex stewed steak", adds to the beef only port, stout, vinegar or ketchup, and black pepper. The book contains "practical notes on how to make an authentic paella, cook vegetables crisp like the Chinese, and, with assistance from notes by long-dead Indian colonels, how to prepare a genuinely Indian curry."

As David remarked in this section, her approach to measuring out ingredients had changed since her early days: "By temperament a non-measurer, I have myself, first through the wish to communicate recipes and now by force of habit, become the reverse. I find that the discipline of weighing and measuring does one's cooking nothing but good, provided that one does not waste time messing about with quarter-saltspoons and five-eighths of pints, nor, above all, expect that precision will eliminate the necessity to keep one's head or train one's eye and palate." The author does not conceal her dislike for some much-used herbs: sage "deadens the food with its musty dried blood scent" and rosemary "acrid taste … the spiky little leaves get stuck between your teeth."

The book was published as the first of a planned series for Penguin Books, "English Cooking, Ancient and Modern." Penguin reprinted the book with revisions in 1973, 1981 and 1987. In 2000 Grub Street publishers issued a new edition.

== English Bread and Yeast Cookery (1977) ==
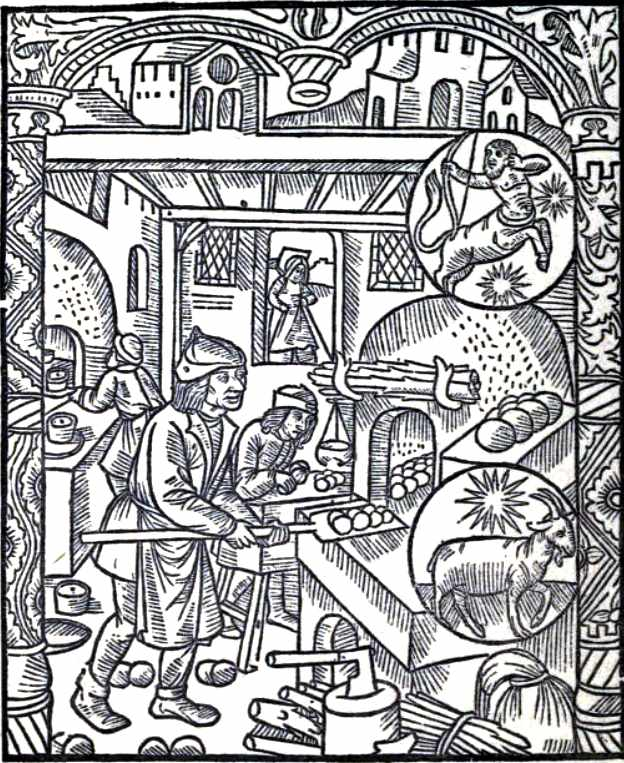
15th-century woodcut showing a baker and a pastrycook at work, reproduced in English Bread and Yeast Cookery

David follows the pattern of Spices, Salt and Aromatics in the English Kitchen, devoting the first part of the book to history and the second to recipes. Reviewing the new book, Jane Grigson wrote: "Mrs. David gives the history of wheat and milling … She goes into weights and cost from the establishment in 1266 of the Assize of Bread up to present-day regulations, with a separate chapter on costing your own bread vis-à-vis bought loaves."

In the second part, David devotes chapters to recipes for various forms of baking. Bread comes first, followed by recipes for, among many other things, buns, yeast cakes, soda-bread, brioches, croissants, pain au chocolat, and pizza. As in her earlier books, the recipes are interspersed with excerpts from earlier authors, including Fernand Braudel, Auguste Escoffier, and the painter John Constable.

In The Observer, Hilary Spurling called the book "a scathing indictment of the British bread industry" and also "a history of virtually every development since Stone Age crops and querns". Spurling rejoiced in the range of David's recipes: "It contains directions for baking anything from the common cob and Coburg to Peggy-tub or Flowerpot bread, Sussex Plum Heavies, Scotch bun and Selkirk bannock, not forgetting splits, baps, muffins, crumpets, wiggs and chudleighs." The Times said, "This is probably Mrs. David's most academic work yet. However, not one ounce of the familiar charm, good sense, asperity (reserved for modern commercial white bread), clarity or warmth is missing."

The book was published by Alan Lane in hardback and Penguin Books in paperback, with reprints in 1978 and 1979. The first American edition was published by Viking Press in 1980, and a rewritten American edition was published by Penguin in 1982. In 1995, Biscuit Books of Newton, Mass. published a new American edition. A new edition was published in London by Grub Street books in 2010.

== Elizabeth David Classics (1980) ==
In 1980 Jill Norman published a hardback volume containing the complete illustrated text of three existing David books: A Book of Mediterranean Food, French Country Cooking and Summer Cooking. David's revised texts of, and introductions to, the second editions of the first two books are included. Jane Grigson wrote a preface to the triple volume, summarising David's achievements. The book was reissued by Grub Street publishers in 1999, and (at 2018) has remained in print continuously.

== An Omelette and a Glass of Wine (1984) ==
Although David had drawn on her many magazine articles for material in her earlier books, An Omelette and Glass of Wine was the first straightforward anthology of her work. Compiled with the assistance of Jill Norman, it consists of David's selections from her essays and articles published since 1949 in publications "from the Sunday Times to Nova, from Vogue to the Spectator, from the long defunct travel magazine Go to Cyril Ray's Compleat Imbiber, Peter Dominic's Wine Mine and a quite a few others." Jane Grigson wrote of it, "An Omelette and a Glass of Wine is different from any other book by Elizabeth David. Yet in a sense it includes them, holds them together. We feel closer to Mrs David herself in this book, and I suppose it is the closest we are likely to get to an autobiography".

Colonel Nathaniel Newnham-Davis, one of David's subjects in An Omelette and a Glass of Wine

The article from which the volume takes its title is an essay on "the almost primitive and elemental meal evoked by the words: 'Let's just have an omelette and a glass of wine.'" Among the other subjects are profiles of people including Norman Douglas, Marcel Boulestin, Mrs Beeton, and "A gourmet in Edwardian London", Colonel Nathaniel Newnham-Davis. Several sections are devoted to descriptions of the markets at Cavaillon, Yvetot, Montpellier, Martigues and Valence, and unpretentious restaurants and hotels in France. There are articles on lemons, potted meat, mayonnaise, pizza, syllabubs, truffles, and on the cuisines of Spain and Morocco. For most of the articles David provided either an introduction or an afternote, or both.

The Times described the book as "this serenely unhurried gathering of essays, book reviews, pamphlets, travellers' tales and cookery articles. The food writer Alan Davidson spoke of David's "intellectual vitality, her amazing memory for detail, her passionate interest in getting everything right, her feeling for style in the larger sense", qualities that the chef Rowley Leigh found demonstrated in An Omelette and a Glass of Wine.

The book was published by Robert Hale. In 1985 Dorling Kindersley published an edition, and the first US edition was published by Viking, New York, in the same year. The first paperback edition was published by Penguin Books in 1986. Translations have been published in Danish, Swedish and Dutch. The book was reprinted in 1986, 1996, and 1997. In 2009 a new edition was published by Grub Street, London; in 2010 a new US edition was issued by Lyons Press, Guilford, Connecticut.

== Booklets ==
David wrote eight short booklets between 9 and 38 pages in length. The first, second and seventh were commissioned by commercial companies; the other five were for sale in the Elizabeth David shop.

- The Use of Wine in Fine Cooking. London: Saccone and Speed. 1950. OCLC 315839710.
- The Use of Wine in Italian Cooking. London: Saccone and Speed. 1952. OCLC 25461747.
- Dried Herbs, Aromatics and Condiments. London: Elizabeth David Ltd. 1967. OCLC 769267360.
- English Potted Meats and Fish Pastes. London: Elizabeth David Ltd. 1968. ISBN 978-0-901794-01-7.
- Syllabubs and Fruit Fools. London: Elizabeth David Ltd. 1969. OCLC 928158148.
- The Baking of an English Loaf. London: Elizabeth David Ltd. 1969. ISBN 978-0-901794-00-0.
- Cooking with Le Creuset. London: E D Clarbat. 1969. OCLC 86055309.
- Green Pepper Berries: A New Taste. London: Elizabeth David Ltd. 1972. OCLC 985520523.

== Contributions to others' books ==
David had a high regard for many other cooks, past and present, and contributed introductions and other material to several works by other writers. Those listed in the WorldCat and the British Library catalogues are:

- The Gentle Art of Cookery by Mrs C. F. Leyel and Olga Hartley (1925). 1974 edition published by Chatto & Windus, with an introduction by Elizabeth David.
- Cooking with Pomiane edited and translated from the French of Édouard de Pomiane by Peggie Benton. New edition, Cassirer, 1976, with foreword by Elizabeth David.
- Cooks and Confectioners Dictionary (originally 1726) by John Nott. David contributed the introduction and glossary to a 1980 edition of the book published by Lawrence Rivington.
- The Best of Eliza Acton. Recipes from her book Modern Cookery for Private Families (1845). Penguin edition, 1986, selected and edited by Elizabeth Ray, with an introduction by Elizabeth David.

David was a contributor to two books about wine:

- Here's How, 1965. A centenary publication (80 pages) by Victoria Wine, for which David wrote an 18-page article, "Here's How to Use Wine in the Kitchen".
- On Wine, by Gerald Asher, 1983, published by Norman & Hobhouse. Introduction by Elizabeth David.

== Posthumous publications ==
David had worked with the editor Jill Norman since the 1960s, and Norman became intimately familiar with David's writings. The success of David's last book, in collaboration with Norman, and David's express wishes that Norman complete some of her work in progress, led Norman to edit and publish books of David's work after the author's death in 1992.

=== Harvest of the Cold Months (1994) ===
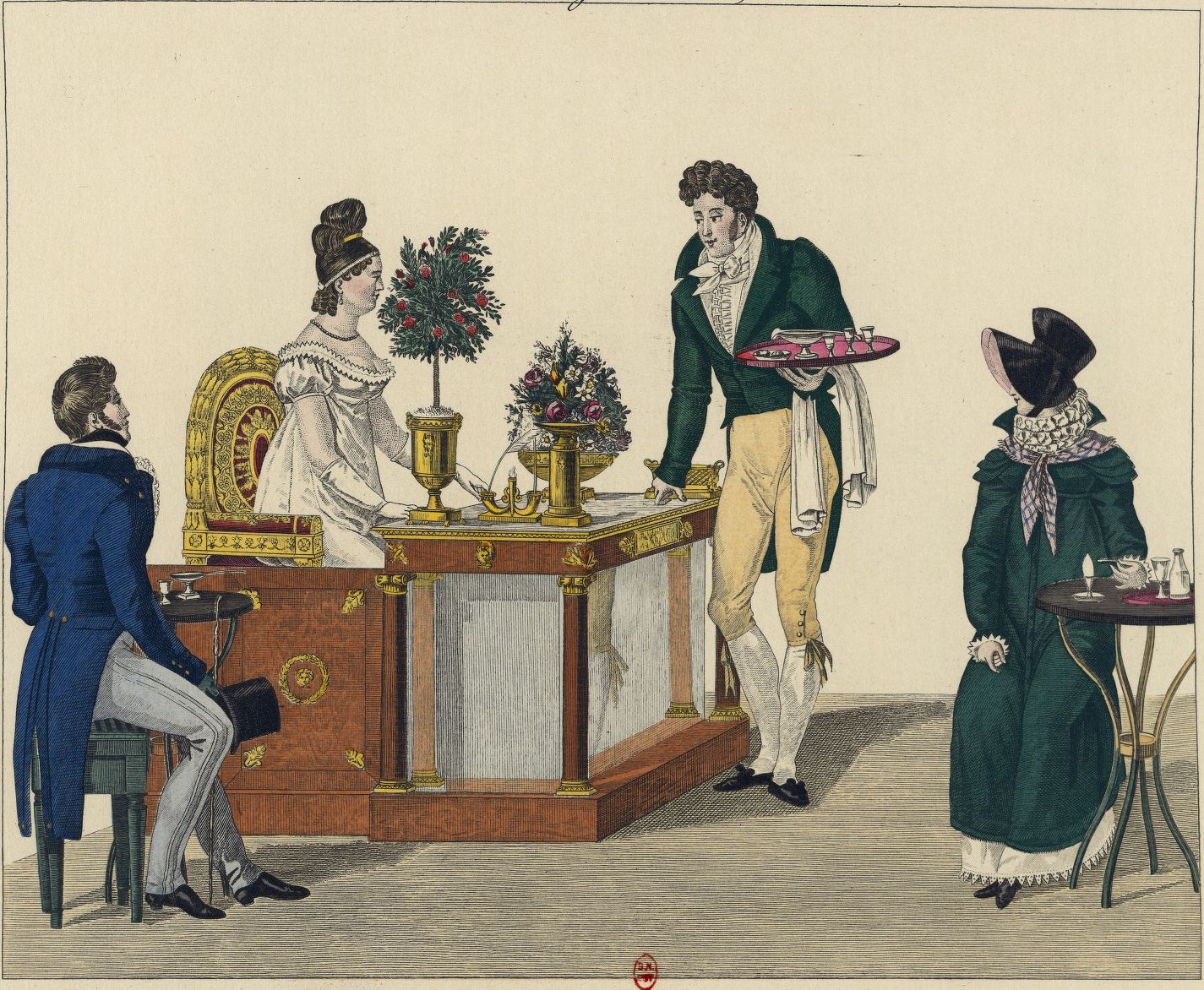
La Belle Limonadière, 1827, reproduced in Harvest of the Cold Months

David had been working on this book intermittently for several years before her last illnesses. When she realised that she would not live to complete it, she asked Jill Norman to do so. It was a demanding task; Norman found that "the book had grown without a structure … it was a collection of essays, really." The book traces the history of ice in the cuisines of Europe from mediaeval times, when it had to be brought from the mountains and kept in ice houses ("anything from a hole in the ground lined with straw to elaborate domes"). It was noticeably more academic in tone than any of its predecessors, a book for the scholar rather than the cook. Reviewing the work, Candice Rodd wrote:

Harvest of the Cold Months is not a cookery book but an awe-inspiring feat of detective scholarship, the literally marvellous story of how human beings came to ingest lumps of flavoured frozen matter for pleasure. It bulges with recipes variously crude, exquisite and fantastical, but most are for wonderment rather than use. You sense the writer's quiet triumph as she turns the musty, fragile pages of yet another ancient memoir or book of receipts and sees one more piece of the fascinating global jigsaw slip satisfyingly into place. You remember that before she was a cook she was a history student.

In The Times, Nigella Lawson wrote that although the book deserved a place on the shelves of anyone who cared about food, it revealed a waning of the author's energies, and "lacks her customary, high-spirited, if fierce, readability".

1622 "frigidarium" for chilling liquids, shown in Harvest of the Cold Months

The book was published in London by Michael Joseph and in New York by Viking. It was reprinted in 1995 and 1996.

=== I'll be with You in the Squeezing of a Lemon (1995) ===
An 89-page, small-format book (approximately A6), issued as one of a series of 60 such books marking the publisher, Penguin's 60th anniversary. Other books in the series were by authors from Martin Amis to Virginia Woolf. The essay from which the book takes its title is from An Omelette and a Glass of Wine; the other eleven chapters are extracts from all the main David books published during her liftetime.

=== Peperonata and Other Italian Dishes (1996) ===
A successor to the above, in a subsequent "Penguin 60" series, consisting of 64 small-format pages, with text drawn from Italian Food and others of David's books. Terence Conran commented shortly after its release that the little book had immediately gone into the British top ten list of best-selling cookery books, alongside Delia Smith's Summer Collection.

=== South Wind Through the Kitchen (1997) ===
Among the projects of David's later years with which she worked with her editor, Jill Norman, was a single-volume collection of the best of her extensive writings. When David's health deteriorated, the project was shelved. In 1996, Norman revived it, and invited chefs, writers and David's friends to choose their favourite articles and recipes. Cooks and restaurateurs who contributed included Terence Conran, Simon Hopkinson, Prue Leith and Alice Waters; among the writers were Derek Cooper, Paul Levy, Richard Olney and Katharine Whitehorn. Many of them contributed an introduction or afterword to the pieces they chose. The extracts and recipes are taken from all David's books published by 1996. There are more than 200 recipes, organised in the customary way with sections on courses and ingredients – eggs and cheese, fish and shellfish, meat, poultry and game, vegetables, pasta, pulses and grains, sauces, sweet dishes and cakes, preserves, and bread – interspersed, as in David's earlier works, with articles and essays.

The title of the book comes from an essay published in 1964 and reprinted in An Omelette and a Glass of Wine, and is a reference to South Wind, a novel by David's greatly loved friend Norman Douglas.

The book was published by Michael Joseph. An American edition was published by North Point Press, New York, in 1998. A Chinese translation was published in 2000.

=== Is There a Nutmeg in the House? (2000) ===
Frontispiece of L'Art de bien faire les glaces d'office (1768) reproduced in "Hunt the Ice Cream" in Is There a Nutmeg in the House?

This book is a successor to An Omelette and a Glass of Wine, consisting, like its predecessor, of magazine articles, essays and other earlier writings. When selecting the material for the earlier book, David and Jill Norman, who assisted her, found too many articles to fit into a single volume, and many were filed away for a sequel. After David's death, Norman supplemented them with articles written by David in the 1980s. The first section of the book is a short autobiographical piece, a rarity from David, who guarded her privacy carefully. David's interest in the historical aspects of cuisine is given scope in essays on the history of Oxo and Bovril, Alexis Soyer and the potato. Articles aimed at the domestic cook include "Do not Despair over Rice", "Making Ice Cream", and one propounding a view for which she was famous: "Garlic Presses are Utterly Useless".

The book was published in hardback by Michael Joseph, and in paperback by Penguin, in 2001. An American edition was published by Viking in 2001.

=== Elizabeth David's Christmas (2003) ===
David and her editor Jill Norman had discussed such a book as early as the 1970s, but work on other projects precluded it. After David's death, Norman found when sorting out her papers that David had written and compiled far more material on a Christmas theme than anyone else had realised. Among the papers was an introduction that David had written for the projected volume, in which she said that one of her motives for writing a book about Christmas cooking was to head off the annual last-minute requests for recipes from her friends and relations. Those she had found most frequently asked for formed the core of the book. Together with some Christmas recipes from Mediterranean Food, French Provincial Cooking, and Spices, Salt and Aromatics in the English Kitchen, and revised articles published in previous years in magazines, they were turned into a 214-page book. The chapters dealt with the social and historical side of Christmas, first courses and cold meats, soups, poultry and game, meat, vegetables and salads, sauces, pickles and chutneys, and desserts, cakes and drinks.

The book reprints one of David's most quoted sentences, first printed in Vogue in 1959, and included in Is there a Nutmeg in the House in 2000: "If I had my way – and I shan't – my Christmas Day eating and drinking would consist of an omelette and cold ham and a nice bottle of wine at lunchtime, and a smoked salmon sandwich with a glass of champagne on a tray in bed in the evening." The pattern of the book follows that of earlier ones, with recipes interspersed with more discursive essays on subjects such as avocado pears, persimmons, historical menus, and Christmas hampers, and extracts from prose by writers whom David admired, including Sybille Bedford and George Eliot.

The book was published by Michael Joseph. An American edition was published by David R. Godine, Boston, in 2008.

=== Of Pageants and Picnics (2005) ===
Part of a set of seventy "Pocket Penguins", this small-format 64-page book contains articles and recipes reprinted from previously published books by the author. The sections are headed: Picnics, Eating Out in Provincial France, The Markets of France, Italian Fish Markets. Summer Holidays, À la mariniere, and Improvised Cooking for Holidays and Week-ends.

=== At Elizabeth David's Table (2010) ===
The book was published to mark the 60th anniversary of David's first book. With prefatory contributions from several prominent British chefs including Jamie Oliver, Rose Gray, Simon Hopkinson and Hugh Fearnley-Whittingstall, it assembles recipes and essays from David's previously published works. The recipes are divided into twelve sections: Starters and light dishes; Soups; Eggs; Pasta; Vegetables; Rice; Fish, shellfish and crustacea; Meat; Poultry and game birds; Sauces; Sweet dishes and cakes; Bread and yeast baking. These chapters are interspersed with reprinted essays and articles from earlier books: "Fast and Fresh"; "Fresh Herbs"; "Confort Anglais, French Fare"; "Pasta Asciutta"; "The Markets of France: Cavaillon"; "My Dream Kitchen"; "Italian Fish Markets"; "Dishes for Collectors"; "Wine in the Kitchen"; "Para Navidad"; "Banketting Stuffe"; "The Baking of an English Loaf"; and "The Italian Pizza and the French Pissaladière". The book contained illustrations by Jon Gray and photographs by David Loftus.It was published in London by Michael Joseph and in New York by Ecco in 2010.

=== A Taste of the Sun (2011) ===
Like Of Pageants and Picnics, though in larger format and with more pages (118), this book is a rejigging of previously published chapters and articles, drawing from French Country Cooking, Of Pageants and Picnics, Italian Food, Is There a Nutmeg in the House?, French Provincial Cooking, English Bread and Yeast Cookery and An Omelette and a Glass of Wine.

=== Elizabeth David on Vegetables (2013) ===
A further réchauffé, drawn principally from Mediterranean Food, Italian Food, French Provincial Cooking and An Omelette and a Glass of Wine. Sections are headed, Soups, Small dishes, Salads, Pasta, gnocchi & polenta, Rice, beans & lentils, Main dishes, Breads, and Desserts. Recipes range from aillade toulousaine (garlic and walnut sauce) and Angevin salad (lettuce and endive with Gruyère or Emmenthal cheese) to watercress and potato soup and zuppa pavese (bread and egg soup). The book was illustrated with photographs by Kristin Perers, and published by Quadrille in London and Viking Studio in New York.

== Sources ==
- Cooper, Artemis (2000). Writing at the Kitchen Table – The Authorized Biography of Elizabeth David. London: Michael Joseph. ISBN 0-7181-4224-1.
- David, Elizabeth (1999) [1950, 1951, 1955]. Elizabeth David Classics – Mediterranean Food; French Country Cooking; Summer Food (second ed.). London: Grub Street. ISBN 1-902304-27-6.
- David, Elizabeth (1989) [1954]. Italian Food (sixth ed.). London: Penguin. ISBN 0-14-046841-2.
- David, Elizabeth (1979) [1960]. French Provincial Cooking (fourth ed.). Harmondsworth: Penguin. ISBN 0-14-046099-3.
- David, Elizabeth (1970). Spices, Salt and Aromatics in the English Kitchen. Harmondsworth: Penguin. ISBN 0-14-046163-9.
- David, Elizabeth (1977). English Bread and Yeast Cookery. Harmondsworth: Penguin. ISBN 0-14-046299-6.
- David, Elizabeth (1986) [1984]. An Omelette and a Glass of Wine (second ed.). Harmondsworth: Penguin. ISBN 0-14-046721-1.
- David, Elizabeth (1994). Norman, Jill (ed.). Harvest of the Cold Months: the social history of ice and ices. London: Michael Joseph. ISBN 0-7181-3703-5.
- David, Elizabeth (1997). Norman, Jill (ed.). South Wind Through the Kitchen: the best of Elizabeth David. London: Michael Joseph. ISBN 0-7181-4168-7.
- David, Elizabeth (1999) [1980]. Elizabeth David Classics. London: Grub Street. ISBN 978-1-902304-27-4.
- David, Elizabeth (2001) [2000]. Norman, Jill (ed.). Is There a Nutmeg in the House? (second ed.). London: Penguin. ISBN 0-14-029290-X.
- David, Elizabeth (2003). Norman, Jill (ed.). Elizabeth David's Christmas. London: Michael Joseph. ISBN 0-7181-4670-0.
- David, Elizabeth (2010). Norman, Jill (ed.). At Elizabeth David's Table: her very best everyday recipes. London: Michael Joseph. ISBN 978-0-7181-5475-2.
- David, Elizabeth (2013). Norman, Jill (ed.). Elizabeth David on Vegetables. New York: Viking Studio. ISBN 978-0-670-01668-6.
