= Georgia Powell =

English journalist

Her Grace The Duchess of Beaufort
- Born: Georgia Powell; February 18, 1969 (age 57)
- Occupation: Journalist
- Spouse: Henry Somerset, 12th Duke of Beaufort (m. 2018)

Georgia Somerset, Duchess of Beaufort (née Powell; born 18 February 1969) is an English journalist who is married to Henry Somerset, 12th Duke of Beaufort.

Powell is the daughter of the director and producer Tristram Powell and his wife, the former Virginia Lucas, and is thus a granddaughter of the novelist Anthony Powell. She studied Classics at the University of Oxford, and is best known as a columnist and obituarist for the Daily Telegraph.

Her first marriage, in 1996, was to Tobias Coke; they had a son and a daughter. On 30 April 2018, she married the Duke of Beaufort at St Michael and All Angels Church, Badminton. The Duke had previously divorced his first wife, actress Tracy Ward, after making a public announcement to guests at the Duke of Beaufort's annual hunt ball.

== Publications ==
- By Georgia Powell Chin Up, Girls!: A Book of Women's Obituaries from the Daily Telegraph (with Katharine Ramsay). John Murray, 2005. ISBN 9780719563010
