= David Somerset, 11th Duke of Beaufort =

English peer and major landowner

His Grace The Duke of Beaufort GCC
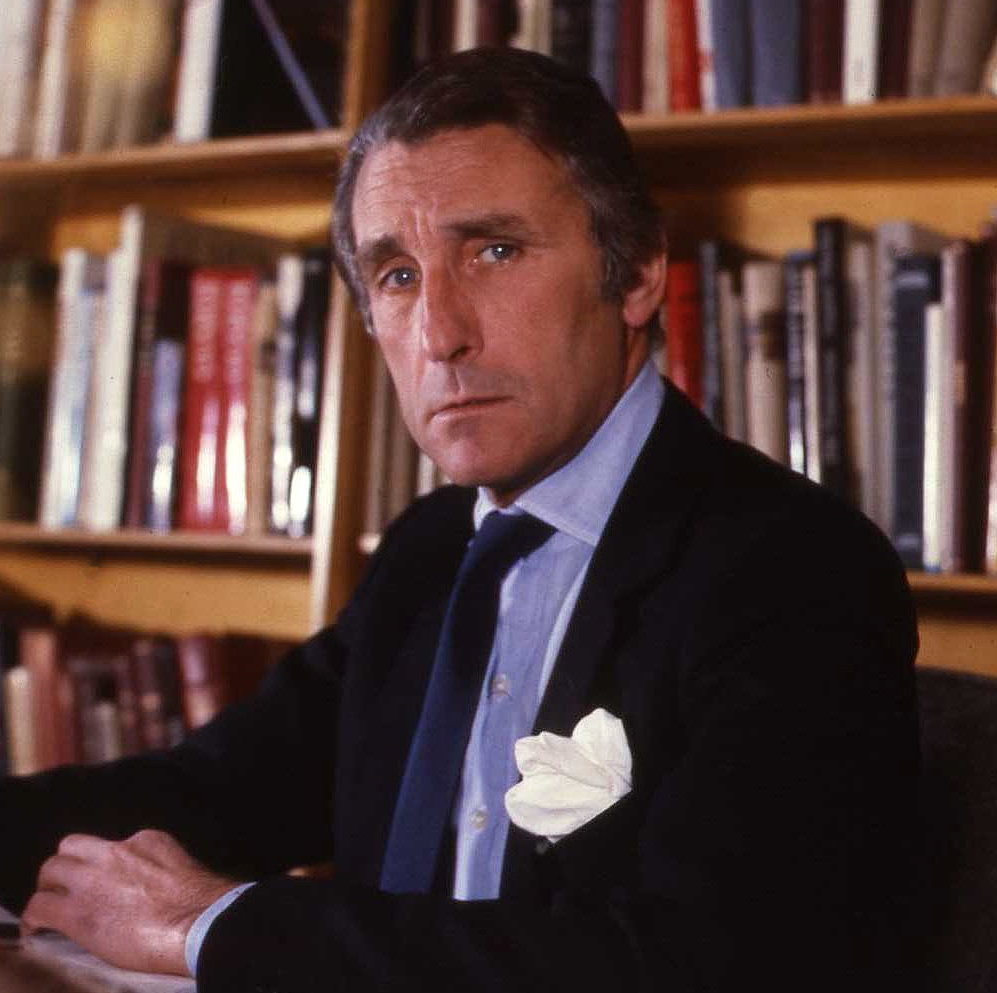

Member of the House of Lords Lord Temporal
- In office 5 February 1984 – 11 November 1999 as a hereditary peer
- Preceded by: Henry Somerset, 10th Duke of Beaufort
- Succeeded by: Henry Somerset, 12th Duke of Beaufort

Personal details
- Born: David Robert Somerset; 23 February 1928
- Died: 16 August 2017 (aged 89) Badminton, Gloucestershire, England
- Spouses: Lady Caroline Jane Thynne (m. 1950; died 1995) Miranda Elisabeth Morley (m. 2000)
- Children: Henry Somerset, 12th Duke of Beaufort; Lady Anne Somerset; Lord Edward Somerset; Lord John Somerset
- Military career
- Allegiance: United Kingdom
- Branch: British Army
- Service years: 1946–?
- Service number: 370772

David Robert Somerset, 11th Duke of Beaufort GCC (23 February 1928 – 16 August 2017), known as David Somerset until 1984, was an English peer and major landowner.

An important figure in the world of fox hunting, he was also chairman of Marlborough Fine Art and was well known for frequent conflicts with hunt saboteurs. He also held the office of Hereditary Keeper of Raglan Castle and was President of the British Horse Society.

== Early life ==
David Somerset was the second son of Captain Henry Robert Somers FitzRoy de Vere Somerset, by his marriage in 1922 to Bettine Violet Malcolm, a daughter of Major C. E. Malcolm. He was educated at Eton College. His father was the grandson of Lord Henry Somerset, second son of the 8th Duke of Beaufort and the temperance activist Lady Isabella Somers-Cocks.

He and his family were descended in the male line from Edward III of England; the first Somerset was a legitimised son of Henry Beaufort, Duke of Somerset, whose grandfather was a legitimized son of John of Gaunt. By the time he succeeded as Duke he was therefore considered the senior representative of the House of Plantagenet, through a legitimised line. Somerset's father was the heir presumptive to the Dukedom of Beaufort and the large estates attached to it.

By the time he was about twelve, it was becoming clear that his father's first cousin once removed Henry Somerset, 10th Duke of Beaufort, was unlikely to have a son, unless his childless wife Mary Somerset, Duchess of Beaufort, died and he remarried, and that Somerset's father and elder brother, John Alexander Somerset, were the likely next dukes. The outlook changed in April 1945, when his elder brother was killed in action in the Allied invasion of Germany. As a result, at the age of seventeen Somerset himself became the likely heir.

David Somerset, as he then was, was commissioned into the Coldstream Guards on 6 September 1946 as a second lieutenant. He was promoted to lieutenant on 1 January 1949.

== Later life ==
After his years in the British Army, Somerset took up residence in Gloucestershire, hunted with the Beaufort Hunt, and following his father's death in 1965 it was increasingly certain that he or one of his sons would be the next Duke of Beaufort. He finally succeeded to the family titles and estates in 1984.

As Duke of Beaufort, he was a major landowner and figure in the world of fox hunting, and he became well known for a raffish reputation and also for frequent conflicts with hunt saboteurs. He held the office of Hereditary Keeper of Raglan Castle, was President of the British Horse Society between 1988 and 1990, and was chairman of Marlborough Fine Art. He ranked 581st in the Sunday Times Rich List 2008, with an estimated wealth of £135m in land and 52,000 acres. The Duke was nominated to the International Best Dressed List Hall of Fame in 1988.

He had a seat in the House of Lords, where he sat as a Conservative from 1984 to 1999. He was one of those who lost their seats as a result of New Labour's reforms in the House of Lords Act 1999.

The Duke was criticised in January 2009 when a Swansea councillor, Ioan Richard, discovered by a Freedom of Information Act request that he had been paid £281,431 for a 70 ft bridge to be built over the River Tawe near Swansea. The Dukes of Beaufort had owned the river bed for some 400 years, so when the local council had wanted to build a bridge linking a shopping centre to the Liberty Stadium, home of Swansea City football club and the Ospreys rugby team, it had to pay the Duke for the right to cross his river bed. Ioan Richard stated that he was "furious that public money had to be used to pay one of Britain's richest estates. For centuries Swansea folk have paid rents to the Duke of Beaufort and we don't owe this powerful and wealthy family anything." A spokesman for the duke's estate at Badminton House responded: "We do not want to comment about a private transaction."

Beaufort died aged 88, on 16 August 2017 at Badminton House, Gloucestershire.

== Family ==
He married, firstly, Lady Caroline Jane Thynne, daughter of the 6th Marquess of Bath, on 5 July 1950. The marriage took place at St Peter's Church, Eaton Square, in the presence of the King and Queen and members of the royal family.

The Duchess of Beaufort presided over the restoration of Badminton House and its grounds. She received an honorary degree (LLD) from Bristol University for her charitable work.

They had four children:

- Henry John FitzRoy Somerset, 12th Duke of Beaufort (born 22 May 1952); married Tracy Louise Ward (a granddaughter of the 3rd Earl of Dudley, former actress and environmental activist) and has issue, two sons and one daughter. They divorced in 2018.
- Lady Anne Mary Somerset (born 21 January 1955); historian, married Matthew Carr (1953–2011) in 1988 and has one daughter.
- Lord Edward Alexander Somerset (1 May 1958 – 4 December 2024); He married in 1982 the Hon. (Georgiana) Caroline Davidson (2nd daughter of John Davidson, 2nd Viscount Davidson) and is reported as divorcing her after he was jailed for assaulting her. They have two children.
- Lord John Robert Somerset (born 5 November 1964) also known as Lord Johnson Somerset, married to (now divorced from) Lady Cosima Vane-Tempest-Stewart (daughter of Alexander Charles Robert Vane-Tempest-Stewart, 9th Marquess of Londonderry), and has a son and daughter.

The Duke married, secondly, Miranda Elisabeth Morley, on 2 June 2000. She is a daughter of Brigadier General Michael Frederick Morley.

== Honours ==
- Grand Cross of the Order of Christ (Portugal) — 10 October 1955

=== Arms ===
Coat of arms of David Somerset, 11th Duke of Beaufort
Notes The coat of arms of the Duke of Beaufort Coronet The coronet of a Duke Crest A Portcullis Or nailed Azure and chained of the first Escutcheon Quarterly, 1st and 4th, Azure three Fleurs-de-lys Or (France), 2nd and 3rd, Gules three Lions passant guardant in pale Or (England), all within a Bordure compony Argent and Azure Supporters Dexter: a Panther Argent flames issuing from his mouth and ears proper plain collared and chained Or and semée of Torteaux, Hurts and Pommes alternately Sinister: a Wyvern with wings endorsed Vert holding in its mouth a Sinister Hand couped at the wrist Gules Motto Mutare vel timere sperno (Latin for "I scorn to change or to fear")

Peerage of England
Preceded by Henry Somerset	Duke of Beaufort; 1984–2017	Succeeded by Henry Somerset
Preceded by Henry Somerset	Marquess of Worcester; 1984–2017	Succeeded by Henry Somerset
Preceded by Henry Somerset	Earl of Worcester; 1984–2017	Succeeded by Henry Somerset
