= Agents and Patients =

Novel by Anthony Powell (published 1936)

- First edition (publ. Duckworth); Cover by Misha Black)
- Author: Anthony Powell
- Publication date: January 1, 1936
- ISBN: 978-0-434-59902-8

Agents and Patients is the fourth novel by the English writer Anthony Powell. It combines two of the aspects of 1930s life, film and psychoanalysis. In what Powell himself has acknowledged is a roman a clef of sorts, a comically critical eye is cast across entre deux guerres society and its often self-indulgent, usually unsatisfied quest for contentment.

Published in 1936, the novel reflects some of Powell's recent experience scriptwriting for Warners in London. The epigraph from John Wesley which gives the novel its title distinguishes between actors and those acted upon, equating freedom with the condition of ‘agency.’ Powell's fourth novel illustrates the painstaking, sometimes painful, process by which one young man recognizes the truth of Wesley's assertion in his own life, thereby, perhaps, reaching a change in his status as the novel ends.

As is usual in Powell's fiction, the settings are often restaurants, parties, and private apartments (though a Berlin film studio also figures significantly), with social behaviour in such surroundings the sustained focus of comically critical and detailed attention. Of Powell's pre-war novels, Agents and Patients is most insistently focused on the questions of what one wants from life and how one might recognize moments when such desires have been achieved, even when the results are unexpected. The novel continues Powell's evolution of the style and technique he would employ in A Dance to the Music of Time.

It is dedicated to Violet Georgiana, Lady Violet Powell, née Pakenham, wife of Anthony Powell.

== Plot summary ==
Blore-Smith, a young Londoner with more money than sense, feels himself to be living a dull life. A chance meeting with Peter Maltravers (an aspiring filmmaker) and Oliver Chipchase (an amateur psychologist) sends Blore-Smith on a voyage, ostensibly of self-discovery, during which he is analyzed by Chipchase and becomes a patron of the arts by funding a Maltravers film. The “two knaves” bring Blore-Smith to art galleries, to restaurants, to Paris—at each stage extracting both money and entertainment from their ‘patient’.

Blore-Smith falls in love with Maltravers’ wife, Sarah (a motoring enthusiast), becomes entangled with Mrs Mendoza (Mendie), whose flower shop, la cattleya, evokes Proust, and eventually travels with Maltravers and Chipchase to Berlin, where he observes first-hand the workings of the cinema. A film is being prepared with several different endings, each catering to the self-perception of the nation in which it will be shown. The novel returns to a country estate for its conclusion.

The end of Blore-Smith's saga is ambiguous: perhaps he has gained something valuable from his experiences; perhaps he has not yet reached the point of intellectual development at which he can recognize his gains. The novel remains Burtonesque, clearly showing that the persistent belief that life does have something else to offer, no matter what one may currently have, is the essence of melancholy.

Agents and Patients has been praised for its masterful irony.
