= Adrian Daintrey =

British painter (1902–1988)

Adrian Maurice Daintrey, RWA (1902–1988) was a British portrait and landscape painter.

== Life ==
Adrian Daintrey was born in Balham, London on 23 June 1902, the youngest of three children of Ernest Daintrey, a solicitor and his wife Lucy Mary (née Blagdon). He was educated at Charterhouse School, where he developed his artistic skills, at the Slade School of Fine Art from 1920 to 1924, and at the École du Louvre and L'Académie de la Grande Chaumière, Paris. He gathered a wide circle of friends including the artists Augustus John, Nina Hamnett and Rex Whistler. The novel, The Acceptance World by Anthony Powell novel, is dedicated to him.

He shared his first exhibition with Paul Nash at Dorothy Warren's Gallery in 1928. During the Second World War, he served widely abroad. After the war he held shows at his studio to promote his work. He worked for Punch from 1953 to 1961 as the art critic. He illustrated Elizabeth David's Summer Cooking and several of her other titles, sometimes working with John Minton. From the late 1960s he taught part-time at the City and Guilds of London Art School. His illustrated memoir I Must Say offers a vivid portrayal of London life among artistic and bohemian circles in the 1920s and 30s.

He died at the Charterhouse almshouse where he had lived as a Brother from 1984 until his death.

== Exhibitions ==
- South London Art Gallery
- Michael Parkin Fine Art
- Sally Hunter Fine Art

== Collections ==
- 15 artworks by or after Adrian Daintrey at the Art UK site
- British Museum (1 drawing)
- Imperial War Museum (9 works)
- National Portrait Gallery (1 portrait)

== Legacy ==
Hilary Spurling records that the central character in Anthony Powell's 1933 novel From a View to a Death is "a pushy young painter, an irrepressible opportunist of colossal nerve and cheek called Arthur Zouch, easily recognizable to friends as Adrian Daintrey." The character is invited to the Passengers' country house to paint family portraits, and in return he seduces the young women of the house until the father, furious, sends him out to hunt on a dangerous horse, and Zouch falls, breaking his neck.
