= Afternoon Men =

1931 novel by Anthony Powell

- First edition (publ. Duckworth); Cover art by Misha Black
- Author: Anthony Powell
- Publication date: 1931

Afternoon Men is the first published novel by the English writer Anthony Powell. In its characters and themes it anticipates some of the ground Powell would cover in A Dance to the Music of Time, a twelve-volume cycle that spans much of the 20th century and is widely considered Powell's masterpiece.

Published in 1931, it focuses on the romantic adventures and discontents of one William Atwater, together with a circle of his friends and acquaintances, in London around the end of the 1920s. Atwater, a museum clerk, pursues a never-fulfilled relationship with Susan Nunnery throughout the novel, while other characters – painter Raymond Pringle, Harriet Twining, Lola, Verelst, the American publisher Scheigan, and Susan’s father George amongst them – carry on similar dissatisfying quests for emotional fulfilment. The novel is predominantly comic, with persistent melancholy and occasional vitriol also present.

Like much of Powell’s fiction, the novel portrays British society and its subtly stratified interconnections by focusing in detail on individual behaviour both in social situations–at parties, country weekends, at work–and in solitude. Marius Hentea has looked at this era of "the Bright Young People" comparing Afternoon Men to Vile Bodies by Evelyn Waugh and Party Going by Henry Green.

The novel belongs clearly to its era, showing the influence of cinema as both entertainment and as a means of constructing a narrative. As a first novel, Afternoon Men is, perhaps, a little harsher in its humour than a reader might expect, given the subtlety of wit for which Powell later became renowned. The title is drawn from Robert Burton’s The Anatomy of Melancholy, and the novel accords with Burton’s insistence on the need to laugh at human foibles.

== Plot summary ==
Afternoon Men is divided into three sections: "Montage," "Perihelion," and "Palindrome." In the first, we are introduced to Atwater and his circle of acquaintances. We are also given a comically restrained view of the trials and tribulations of a museum clerk’s working day.

In the middle section, Atwater seems to make headway with his courtship of Susan Nunnery. Highlights in this section include the mechanical seduction of Lola, and the attendance of a boxing match by Atwater and Susan.

The final section centers on a retreat to the country by a number of the principals during which several unexpected physical consummations occur and much humour is drawn from the apparent absurdity of many conventions of polite manners and proper behaviour. The novel ends in a kind of ricorso leaving Atwater in more or less the same emotional state in which he began, as suggested by the subtitle, “Palindrome.”
