= Venusberg (mythology) =

Mythological Mountain of Venus

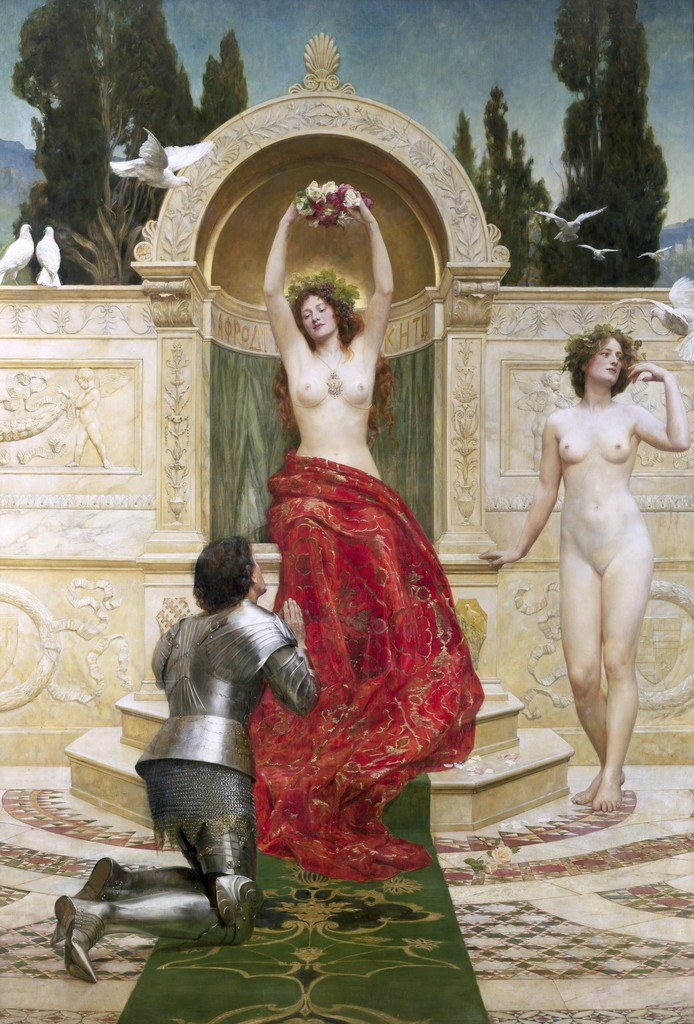
Tannhäuser in the Venusberg by John Collier, 1901: the gilded setting evokes Italian quattrocento paintings

Venusberg (German pronunciation: [ˈveːnʊsbɛʁk], lit. 'Mountain of Venus') is a motif of European folklore rendered in various legends and epics since the Late Middle Ages. It is a variant of the folktale topos of "a mortal man seduced by the fairy queen visits the otherworld" (as in Thomas the Rhymer). In German folklore of the 16th century, the narrative becomes associated with the minnesinger Tannhäuser who becomes obsessed with worshipping the goddess Venus.

== Origin ==
Venusberg as a name of the otherworld or fairyland is first mentioned in German in Formicarius by Johannes Nider (1437/38) in the context of the rising interest in witchcraft at the time.

The earliest version of the narrative of the legend, a knight seeking forgiveness for having adored a pagan goddess in an enchanted mountain, but being rejected by the pope and returning to the mountain, even though a miracle prompts the pope to send emissaries after him to call him back, is first recorded in the form of a ballad by the Provencal writer Antoine de la Sale, part of the compilation known as La Salade (c. 1440). In this version, likely based on an Italian original, the "queen of the fairies" is named Sibylla rather than Venus and there is no association with Tannhäuser.

== Tannhäuser folk ballad ==
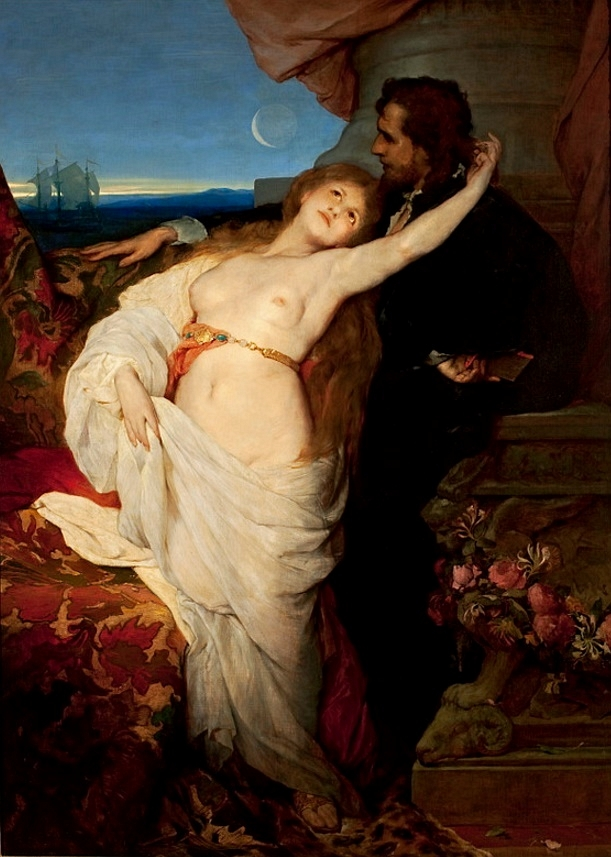
Tannhäuser, painting by Gabriel von Max (c. 1878)

The narrative of La Sale's ballad becomes conflated with the name of Tannhäuser in German folklore of the early 16th century. A German Tannhauser folk ballad is recorded in numerous versions beginning around 1510, both in High German and Low German variants. Folkloristic versions were still collected from oral tradition in the early-to-mid 20th century, especially in the Alpine region (a Styrian variant with the name Waldhäuser was collected in 1924). Early written transmission around the 1520s was by the means of printed single sheets popular at the time, with examples known from Augsburg, Leipzig, Straubing, Vienna, and Wolfenbüttel. The earliest extant version is from Jörg Dürnhofers Liederbuch, printed by Gutknecht of Nuremberg about 1515. This Lied von dem Danheüser [sic] explores the life of the legendary knight Tannhäuser, who spent a year at the mountain worshiping Venus and returned there after believing that he had been denied forgiveness for his sins by Pope Urban IV. The Nuremberg version also identifies Venusberg with the Hörselberg hill chain near Eisenach in Thuringia, although other versions identify other geographical locations, as for instance in Swabia, near Waldsee.

The popularity of the ballad continues unabated well into the 17th century. Versions are recorded by Heinrich Kornmann (1614) and Johannes Praetorius (1668).

== Interpretation ==
The Venusberg legend has been interpreted as a Christianised version of the well-known folk-tale type of a mortal visiting the otherworld: a human being seduced by an elf or fairy experiences the delights of the enchanted realm, but then the longing for his earthly home becomes overwhelming. His desire is granted, but he is not happy (often noting that many years have passed in the world during his absence) and in the end returns to fairy-land.

== Modern reception ==
The ballad was then received in German Romanticism. Ludwig Tieck published the tale in his Romantische Dichtungen collection of 1799. The Praetorius version of 1668 was included in Des Knaben Wunderhorn, a compilation of German folk poems published by Achim von Arnim and Clemens Brentano in 1806. A summary was included in the Deutsche Sagen collection by the Brothers Grimm in 1816. Later adaptions include Joseph Freiherr von Eichendorff's novella Das Marmorbild (The Marble Statue, 1818), as well as works by Ludwig Bechstein (1835) and Ludwig Uhland (Volkslieder, 1844). In Heinrich Heine's laconic poem Tannhäuser: A Legend (1837), the hero spent seven years there before departing for Rome, while Carl Borromäus von Miltitz' short story "Die zwölf Nächte" ('The Twelve Nights') tells a different story set at a castle near the Venusberg, which the hero and Venus return to haunt once a year.

Aubrey Beardsley started to write an erotic treatment of the legend which was never to be finished due to his conversion to Catholicism, repudiation of his past works, and subsequent illness and death; the first parts of it were published in The Savoy and later issued in book form by Leonard Smithers with the title Under the Hill. In 1907, the original manuscript was published and entitled The Story of Venus and Tannhäuser.

William Morris retells the story in "The Hill of Venus", the final story of his epic 1868–1870 poem The Earthly Paradise. Guy Willoughby in his book Art and Christhood: The Aesthetics of Oscar Wilde asserts that the blossoming staff of the eponymous Young King in Oscar Wilde's fairy tale evokes that of Tannhäuser. H. G. Wells' Sleeper watches an adaption in The Sleeper Awakes (1910). He also references it in his short story "The Man Who Could Work Miracles" (1898).

John Heath-Stubbs wrote a poem on the legend called "Tannhauser's End" (Collected Poems page 294). Aleister Crowley wrote a play called Tannhauser which follows the characters Tannhauser and Venus. English poet Algernon Charles Swinburne's "Laus Veneris" ("In Praise of Venus") is a telling of the Tannhauser legend in the first person. Swinburne also composed the medieval French epigraph that purports to be its source. Anthony Powell called an early novel of his Venusberg. Another visitor was Thomas the Rhymer (Thomas Ercildoune, c. 1220–1297). The Tannhauser Gate motif of film (Blade Runner, 1982) and cyberpunk fiction originated as an allusion to the pathway that the knight used to discover and travel to this supposed place of ultimate erotic adventure.

The "Castle Anthrax" episode in Monty Python and the Holy Grail (1975) was based on the Venusberg myth. Author Philip José Farmer references Tannhäuser and Venusberg in the 1967 science fiction novella Riders of the Purple Wage. The plot of Neil Gaiman's story "Neverwhere" broadly mirrors the Tannhauser legend, as does the BBC TV series Life on Mars.

== Sources ==
- A. C. Swinburne. "Laus Veneris". Victorian Web.
