= Anne Somerset (historian) =

English historian and writer

Lady Anne Mary Carr (née Somerset) is an English historian and writer. She is a recipient of the Elizabeth Longford Prize, for Queen Anne: The Politics of Passion.

== Biography ==
Lady Anne Somerset was born in England, and was educated in London, Gloucestershire, and Kent. She read history at King's College London, graduated in 1976, and began her professional career as a research assistant to several historians.

She published her own first book in 1980; it was a popular biography of King William IV, which was reprinted in 1993. She has gone on to write four further works, all focused on English history, mainly in the Tudor and Stuart periods. She has also written about the Affair of the Poisons in Louis XIV's France, and a well-received biography of Queen Anne.

Lady Anne is the widow of the artist Matthew Carr and daughter of David Somerset, 11th Duke of Beaufort. Her mother Caroline was the daughter of Henry Thynne, 6th Marquess of Bath, and the author Daphne Fielding.

== Major works ==
- The Life and Times of King William IV, London: Weidenfeld & Nicolson, 1980
- Ladies in Waiting: From the Tudors to the Present Day, London: Weidenfeld & Nicolson, 1984
- Elizabeth I, London: Weidenfeld & Nicolson, 1991
- Unnatural Murder: Poison at the Court of James I, London: Weidenfeld & Nicolson, 1997
- The Affair of the Poisons: Murder, Infanticide & Satanism at the Court of Louis XIV, London: Weidenfeld & Nicolson, 2003
- Queen Anne: The Politics of Passion, London: HarperPress, 2012
- Queen Victoria and Her Prime Ministers. A Personal History, London: William Collins, 2024
