= From a View to a Death =

Book by Anthony Powell

- Author: Anthony Powell
- Language: English
- Genre: Comedy of manners, Social satire
- Publisher: Gerald Duckworth and Company
- Publication date: 1933
- Publication place: United Kingdom

From a View to a Death is the third novel by the English writer Anthony Powell. It combines comedy of manners with Powell’s usual interest in the subtleties of British 20th-century society in a bitterly funny narrative. Here, Powell begins to write in the mode that he would perfect in A Dance to the Music of Time.

Published in 1933, the novel is set largely in and around Passenger Court, the country seat of the Passenger family. In its depiction of village pageants, churchgoing, village idiots and eccentrics, and, above all, the hunt, From a View to a Death is Powell’s most rural novel. Change in setting notwithstanding, Powell’s habitually Burtonesque laughter at human foibles remains consistent.

The novel focuses on the inevitable conflict occurring when two men, each considering himself a Nietzschean Übermensch, collide. Other conflicts involve shooting rights, parent-child tensions, and, as always in Powell’s work, the dissatisfactions of romance and sex, this time including cross-dressing. Though some interpret the novel as a reaffirmation of traditional English values, no character – whether for reason of class, place of residence, intelligence, or gender – escapes Powell’s increasingly subtle critical examination of human life.

== Plot summary ==
Arthur Zouch, portrait painter and self-declared "superman," comes to stay at Passenger Court, ostensibly to paint the portrait of the younger Passenger daughter, Mary, but in no small part on the lookout for any opportunity he can find to improve either his social, financial, or sexual satisfaction. At Passenger court, he finds opportunity for all three, but he also finds unanticipated conflict in the person of Vernon Passenger, also a self-proclaimed "superman." (Note: Hilary Spurling records that the central character, Zouch, is "a pushy young painter, an irrepressible opportunist of colossal nerve and cheek ... easily recognizable to friends as Adrian Daintrey", a painter.)

Meanwhile, the neighboring Fosdick family – the Major, his sons Torquil and Jasper – carry on a seemingly perpetual feud with the Passengers that is as often characterized by displays of better manners and more proper etiquette as it is by bad temper and argument. Joanna Brandon, a local young woman, further complicates the lives of several of the principals; she may be Powell’s most sensitively rendered female character.

The novel moves through ten chapters toward an inescapable denouement, though never tipping its hand as to precisely how the foreshadowing of the title shall be brought to fruition. The parallel plots (at times almost Lear-like in the development of the neighbouring families) reach a double climax from which only one ‘superman’ can emerge.
