= Anthony Powell =

English novelist (1905–2000)

Anthony Powell CH CBE
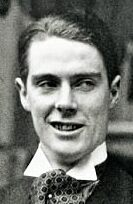
- Powell in 1934
- Born: Anthony Dymoke Powell; 21 December 1905; London, England
- Died: 28 March 2000 (aged 94); Whatley, Somerset, England
- Occupation: Novelist
- Spouse: Lady Violet Pakenham (m. 1934)
- Children: 2, including Tristram
- Writing career
- Notable work: A Dance to the Music of Time

Anthony Dymoke Powell CH CBE (/ˈpoʊəl/ POH-əl; 21 December 1905 – 28 March 2000) was an English novelist best known for his 12-volume work A Dance to the Music of Time, published between 1951 and 1975. It is on the list of longest novels in English.

Powell's major work has remained in print continuously and has been the subject of television and radio dramatisations. In 2008, The Times newspaper named Powell among their list of "the 50 greatest British writers since 1945".

== Life ==
Powell was born in Westminster, the son of Lieutenant-Colonel Philip Lionel William Powell (1882–1959), of the Welch Regiment, and Maud Mary (died 1954), daughter of Edmund Lionel Wells-Dymoke, of The Grange, East Molesey, Surrey. Wells-Dymoke was a descendant of a land-owning family in Lincolnshire, hereditary Champions to monarchs since the reign of Richard II of England. They had married into the family of the Barons Marmion, who first held the position. The Powell family descended from ancient Welsh kings and chieftains. Anthony Powell had a strong interest in genealogy; he conducted extensive research into the Powell family over many years, establishing a paternal descent from Gwriad ap Elidyr — himself a descendant of Coel Hen according to the Genealogies from Jesus College MS 20 and other sources — via Rhys ap Gruffydd to the satisfaction of the heralds of the College of Arms, who in 1964 granted him use of the ancient Powell arms. This pedigree was included in Burke's Landed Gentry.

Because of his father's career and the First World War, the family moved several times, and mother and son sometimes lived apart from Powell's father. Powell attended Gibbs's pre-preparatory day-school for a brief time. He was then sent to New Beacon School near Sevenoaks, which was popular with military families. Early in 1919, Powell passed the Common Entrance Examination for Eton, where he started that autumn. There, he befriended fellow pupil Henry Yorke, later to become known as novelist Henry Green. At Eton, Powell spent much of his spare time at the Studio, where a sympathetic art master encouraged him to develop his talent as a draughtsman and his interest in the visual arts. In 1922, he became a founding member of the Eton Society of Arts. The society's members produced an occasional magazine called The Eton Candle.

In the autumn of 1923, Powell went up to Balliol College, Oxford. Soon after his arrival, he was introduced to the Hypocrites' Club. Outside that club, he came to know Maurice Bowra, then a young don at Wadham College. During his third year, Powell lived out of college, sharing rooms with Henry Yorke. Powell travelled on the Continent during his holidays. He was awarded a third-class degree at the end of his academic years.

Upon his arrival in London after Oxford, part of Powell's social life centred around attendance at formal debutante dances at houses in Mayfair and Belgravia. He renewed acquaintance with Evelyn Waugh, whom he had known at Oxford, and was a frequent guest for Sunday supper at Waugh's parents' house. Waugh introduced him to the Gargoyle Club, which gave him experience in London's Bohemia. He got to know painters Nina Hamnett and Adrian Daintrey, who were neighbours in Fitzrovia, and composer Constant Lambert, who remained a good friend until Lambert's death in 1951.

In 1934, he married Lady Violet Pakenham. In 1952, they moved to The Chantry, a country home in Whatley, west of Frome, Somerset.

Powell was appointed a Commander of the Order of the British Empire (CBE) in the 1956 Birthday Honours, and in 1973, he declined an offer of knighthood. He was appointed Member of the Order of the Companions of Honour (CH) in the 1988 New Year Honours. He served as a trustee of the National Portrait Gallery from 1962 to 1976. With Lady Violet, he travelled to the United States, India, Guatemala, Italy, and Greece.

The individuals to whom Powell dedicated his books and memoirs provide the context of his range of friends and literary connections, including John Bayley (writer), Robert Conquest, Henry d'Avigdor-Goldsmid, Antonia Fraser, Roy Jenkins, Hugh Massingberd, Arthur Mizener, and Edith Sitwell.

Powell's health declined in his later years after multiple strokes. On 28 March 2000, he died at The Chantry at the age of 94.

== Work ==
Powell came to work in London during the autumn of 1926 and lived at various London addresses for the next 25 years. He worked in a form of apprenticeship at the publishers Gerald Duckworth and Company in Covent Garden, where he brought out A Tower of Skulls: a Journey through Persia and Turkish Armenia by Gerald Reitlinger. Powell left Duckworth employ in 1936 after protracted negotiations about title, salary, and working hours. He next took a job as a screenwriter at the Warner Bros. studio in Teddington, where he remained for six months. He made an abortive attempt to find employment in Hollywood as a screenwriter in 1937. He next found work reviewing novels for The Daily Telegraph and memoirs and autobiographies for The Spectator.

Upon the outbreak of the Second World War, Powell, at age 34, joined the British Army as a second lieutenant, making him more than 10 years older than most of his fellow subalterns, not at all well prepared for military life, and lacking in experience. Powell joined the Welch Regiment and was stationed in Northern Ireland at the time of air raids in Belfast. His superiors found uses for his talents, resulting in a series of transfers that brought him to special training courses designed to produce a nucleus of officers to deal with the problems of military government after the Allies had defeated the Axis powers. He eventually secured an assignment with the Intelligence Corps and additional training. His military career continued with a posting to the War Office in Whitehall, where he was attached to the section known as Military Intelligence (Liaison), overseeing relations with, and the basic material needs of, foreign troops in exile, specifically the Czechs, later the Belgians and Luxembourgers, and later still the French. Later for a short time he was posted to the Cabinet Office, to serve on the Secretariat of the Joint Intelligence Committee, securing promotions along the way.

For his service in the Army, he received two General Service medals as well as the 1944 France and Germany Star for escorting a group of Allied military attaches from Normandy to Montgomery's 21st Army Group Tactical HQ in November 1944 three miles from Roermond, Holland then held by the Germans. For representing the interests of foreign armies in exile as a liaison officer he received the following decorations: the Order of the White Lion (Czechoslovakia), Oaken Crown (Luxembourg), Order of Leopold II (Belgium), and Luxembourg War Cross (Croix de Guerre -Luxembourg).

After his demobilisation at the end of the war, writing became his sole career. Despite a holiday trip to the Soviet Union in 1936, he remained unsympathetic to the popular-front, leftist politics of many of his literary and critical contemporaries. A Tory, Powell nonetheless maintained a certain scepticism towards the right as well, often associating with George Orwell and Malcolm Muggeridge. He was wary of right-wing groups and suspicious of inflated rhetoric. He organised Orwell's funeral together with Muggeridge.

== Family ==
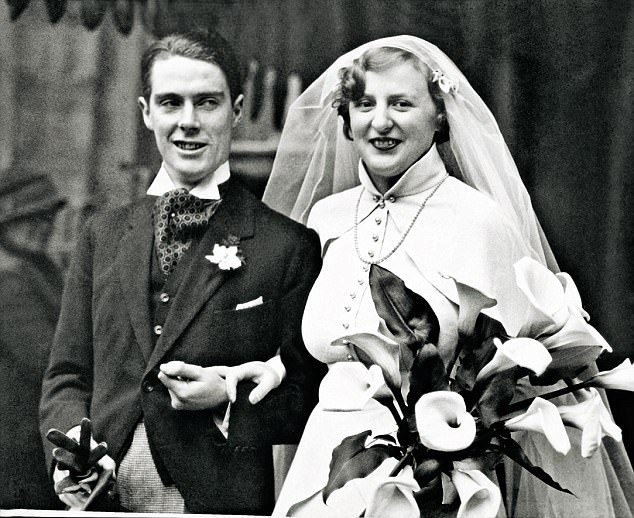
Anthony Powell with Violet on their wedding day in 1934

Powell married Lady Violet Pakenham (1912–2002), sister of Lord Longford, on 1 December 1934 at All Saints, Ennismore Gardens, Knightsbridge. Powell and his wife moved to 1 Chester Gate in Regent's Park, London, where they remained for 17 years. Their first son, Tristram, was born in April 1940, but Powell and his wife spent most of the war years apart while he served in the Welch Regiment and later in the Intelligence Corps. A second son, John, was born in January 1946.

On 30 April 2018, Powell's granddaughter Georgia Powell married Henry Somerset, 12th Duke of Beaufort.

== Writing ==
Powell's first novel, Afternoon Men, was published by Duckworth in 1931, with Powell supervising its production himself. The same firm published his next three novels, Venusberg (1932), From a View to a Death (1933) and Agents and Patients (1936) two of them after Powell had left the firm. The cover design of these three were by Misha Black.

During his time in California, Powell contributed several articles to the magazine Night and Day, edited by Graham Greene. Powell wrote a few more occasional pieces for the magazine until it ceased publication in March 1938. Powell completed his fifth novel, What's Become of Waring, in late 1938 or early 1939. After being turned down by Duckworth, it was published by Cassell in March of that year. The book sold fewer than a thousand copies.

Anticipating the difficulties of creative writing during wartime, Powell began to assemble material for a biography of 17th-century writer John Aubrey. His army career, though, forced him to postpone even that biographical work. When the war ended, Powell resumed work on Aubrey, completing the manuscript of John Aubrey and His Friends in May 1946, though it only appeared in 1948 after difficult negotiations and arguments with publishers. He then edited a selection of Aubrey's writings that appeared the following year.

Powell returned to novel writing, and began to ponder a long novel sequence. Over the next 30 years, he produced his major work: A Dance to the Music of Time. The title of the multivolume series is taken from the painting of the same name by Poussin, which hangs in the Wallace Collection. The cycle of novels, narrated by a protagonist with experiences and perspectives similar to Powell's own, follows the trajectory of the author's own life, offering a vivid portrayal of the intersection of bohemian life with high society between 1921 and 1971. Its characters, many modelled loosely on real people, surface, vanish, and reappear throughout the sequence but Powell claimed that it was not a roman à clef. The characters are drawn from the upper classes, their marriages and affairs, and their bohemian acquaintances. Powell was awarded the 1957 James Tait Black Memorial Prize for the fourth volume, At Lady Molly's. The eleventh volume, Temporary Kings, received the W. H. Smith Prize in 1974.

In parallel with his creative writing, Powell served as the primary fiction reviewer for the Times Literary Supplement. He served as literary editor of Punch from 1953 to 1959. From 1958 to 1990, he was a regular reviewer for The Daily Telegraph, resigning after a vitriolic personal attack on him by Auberon Waugh appeared in that newspaper. He also reviewed occasionally for The Spectator. Many of Powell's book reviews were republished in two volumes of critical essays, Miscellaneous Verdicts (1990) and Under Review (1992).

Between 1976 and 1982, Powell published four volumes of memoirs with the overall title of To Keep the Ball Rolling, followed by two more novels: O, How the Wheel Becomes It! (1983) and The Fisher King (1986).

Several volumes of Powell's Journals, covering 1982 to 1992, appeared between 1995 and 1997. His Writer's Notebook was published posthumously in 2001, and a third volume of critical essays, Some Poets, Artists, and a Reference for Mellors, appeared in 2005.

Alan Furst, an author of spy novels, has noted of him, "Powell does everything a novelist can do, from flights of aesthetic passion to romance to comedy high and low. His dialogue is extraordinary; often terse, pedestrian and perfect, each character using three or four words. Anthony Powell taught me to write; he has such brilliant control of the mechanics of the novel."

== Collage ==
Powell created collages during his writing life. His greatest achievement, the collage in the Chantry, has been characterized as "a monstrous collage of a size and surrealistic disturbance."

The collage took decades to create. It has been digitised and partially reproduced in Anthony Powell: Dancing to the Music of Time as endpapers. A 360-degree panorama is viewable at the website: Powell's "Boiler Room" Collage at The Chantry.

In 2019, the Collage was photographed by Tim Beddow and featured on the cover of The World of Interiors, a Condé Nast magazine. In 2021 Christopher Matthew described it as "One of the most elaborate collages I have ever encountered covering not only the walls and the ceiling, but even the water pipes."

In 2025, writing in Telegraph Luxury with many photos, Harry Mount observed, "the collage is a Sistine Chapel of literary Britain." Powell's great-granddaughter, Hope Coke, wrote an illustrated essay about the boiler room collage in The Oldie.

== Recognition ==
Dance was adapted by Hugh Whitemore for a television miniseries during the autumn of 1997, and broadcast in the UK on Channel 4. The novel sequence was earlier adapted by Graham Gauld and Frederick Bradnum for a BBC Radio 4 26-part series broadcast between 1978 and 1981. In the radio version, the part of Jenkins as narrator was played by Noel Johnson. A second radio dramatisation by Michael Butt was broadcast during April and May 2008.

In 1984, Powell was awarded The Hudson Review's Bennett Award, to honour 'a writer of significant achievement whose work has not received the full recognition to which it is entitled' and the Ingersoll Foundation's T. S. Eliot Award for Creative Writing.

In 1995, Powell was awarded an honorary degree (Doctor of Letters) from the University of Bath.

In 2000 scholars founded The Anthony Powell Society to advance for the public benefit, education and interest in his life and works. The Society publishes quarterly The Anthony Powell Newsletter and the journal, Secret Harmonies.

A centenary exhibition in commemoration of Powell's life and work was held at the Wallace Collection, London, from November 2005 to February 2006.

Smaller exhibitions were held in 2005 and 2006 at Eton College, Cambridge University, the Grolier Club in New York City, and Georgetown University in Washington, DC.

Hilary Spurling, a newspaper colleague, had written at Powell's request in 1977 Invitation to the Dance: A Guide to Anthony Powell's Dance to the Music of Time, and in 2017 published his biography, Anthony Powell: Dancing to the Music of Time.

A Blue plaque was mounted on 16 September 2023 at 1 Chester Gate London NW1 where Powell began writing A Dance to the Music of Time. The Anthony Powell Society organised the ceremony.

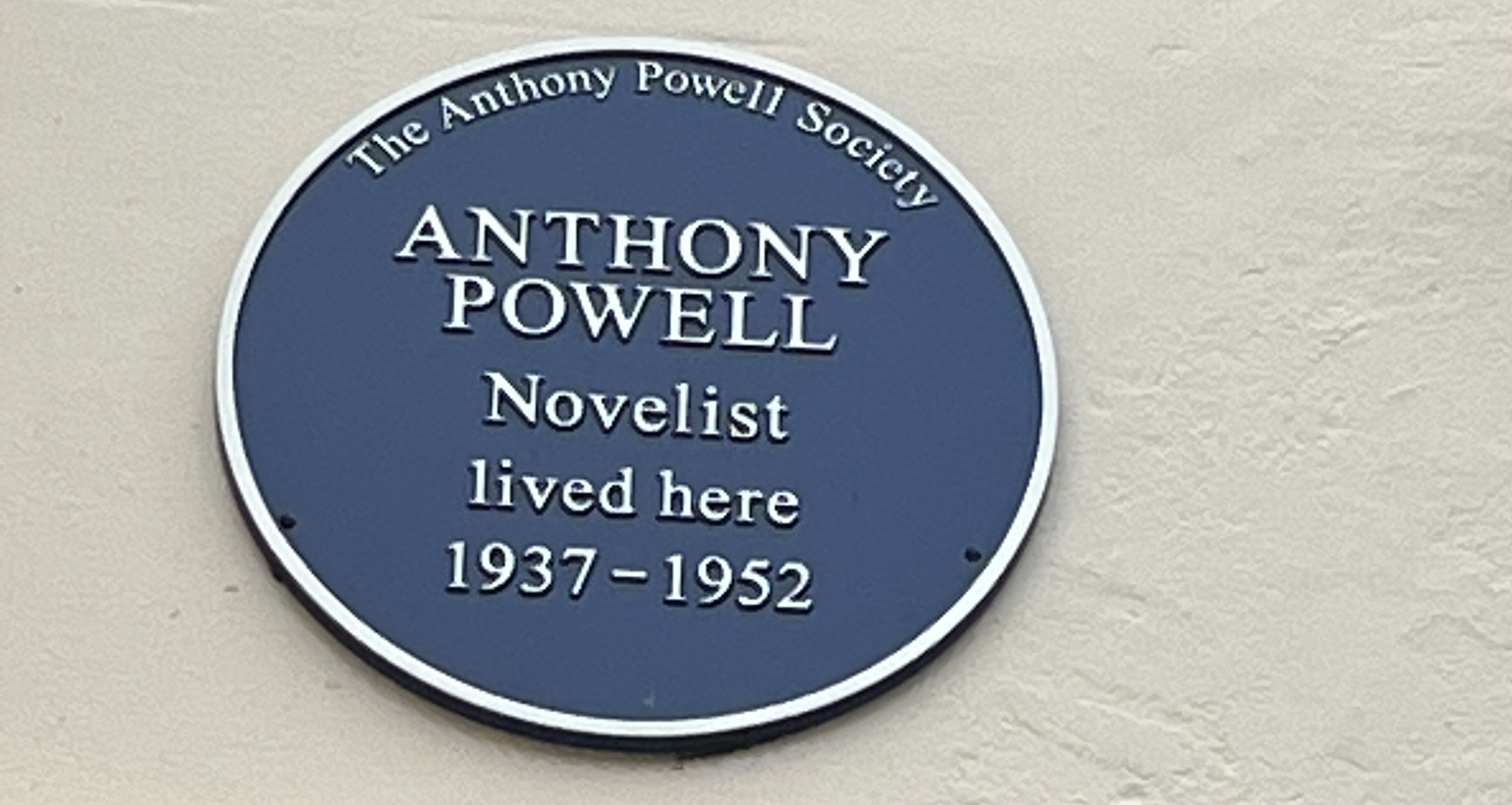

== Bibliography ==
=== A Dance to the Music of Time ===
1. A Question of Upbringing (1951)
2. A Buyer's Market (1952)
3. The Acceptance World (1955)
4. At Lady Molly's (1957)
5. Casanova's Chinese Restaurant (1960)
6. The Kindly Ones (1962)
7. The Valley of Bones (1964)
8. The Soldier's Art (1966)
9. The Military Philosophers (1968)
10. Books Do Furnish a Room (1971)
11. Temporary Kings (1973)
12. Hearing Secret Harmonies (1975)

=== Standalone novels ===
- Afternoon Men (1931)
- Venusberg (1932)
- From a View to a Death (1933)
- Agents and Patients (1936)
- What's Become of Waring (1939)
- O, How the Wheel Becomes It! (1983)
- The Fisher King (1986)

=== Partial bibliography of other plays, and works ===
- The Barnard Letters (1928)
- "The Watr'y Glade", in The Old School: Essays by Divers Hands, ed. Graham Greene (1934)
- Novels of High Society from the Victorian Age. Ed. and introduced by Anthony Powell. Pilot Press, 1947
- John Aubrey and His Friends (1948)
- Brief Lives and Other Selected Writings of John Aubrey. Ed. Anthony Powell. Cresset Press, 1949
- Two Plays: The Garden God, The Rest I'll Whistle (1971)
- A Writer's Notebook, 2001
- Miscellaneous Verdicts. Writings on Writers 1946-1989, 1990
- Under Review. Further Writings on Writers 1946-1989, 1991
- Some Poets, Artists & 'A Reference for Mellors', 2005
- The Acceptance of Absurdity: Anthony Powell & Robert Vanderbilt Letters 1952 - 1963. Eds. John Saumarez Smith & Jonathan Kooperstein. Maggs Bros, 2011
- Anthony Powell on Wine. Edited by Robin Bynoe. Anthony Powell Society, 2017
- King Arthur and Other Personages. Edited by Robin Bynoe. Anthony Powell Society, 2019
- The Lost Heinemann Files And Christmas with Kafka. Edited by Robin Bynoe. Anthony Powell Society, 2026

Memoirs

- To Keep the Ball Rolling: Memoirs of Anthony Powell
  - vol. 1, Infants of the Spring (1976)
  - vol. 2, Messengers of Day (1978)
  - vol. 3, Faces in My Time (1980)
  - vol. 4, The Strangers All are Gone (1982)

A one-volume abridgment, called simply To Keep the Ball Rolling, was published in 1983.

Diaries

- Journals 1982–1986 (1995)
- Journals 1987–1989 (1996)
- Journals 1990–1992 (1997)
