= Christopher Bramham =

British painter

Christopher Bramham (born 1952) is a painter from Britain.

== Biography ==
Bramham was born in Bradford, Yorkshire. He studied at Bradford School of Art from 1970 to 1971, followed by Kingston upon Thames Art School from 1971 to 1973. From 1975 to 1986 he worked as a part-time teacher in various art colleges in London before holding his first solo exhibition, at the Fine Art Society in London in 1988.

Bramham was a close friend of the artist Lucian Freud, whom he first met in 1982. Freud painted Bramham alone in 1989, and again with Bramham's children, Polly and Barney, in 1990. They also exhibited together at the Browse and Darby Gallery in London in 2007, in a three-person show along with the painter Duncan Wood. Prior to this Bramham exhibited at Marlborough Fine Art in London in the 1990s, and again in 2002.

Bramham has work in the collection of the British Council, and the Elaine and Melvin Merians Collection, and he was included in the exhibition of this latter collection at the Yale Center for British Art in New Haven, in 2000.

Bramham lives and works in Cornwall and is represented by Marlborough Fine Art in London.

== Style and influences ==
Bramham is predominantly a landscape painter, although he has also painted interiors and still lives, and his landscape views are frequently of objects in the natural landscape seen close to rather than traditional landscape vistas. In this he has been described as Ruskinian for the way he probes "into nooks and crannies of the natural world". As this reviewer also notes, however, more contemporary comparisons can be made, and Bramham has been associated with the School of London artists, particularly Lucian Freud, and artists such as Peter Doig and Tony Bevan.

His images are built up slowly, with layers of paint applied, according to the art critic Andrew Lambirth, almost in emulation of the speed at which a plant being depicted might grow. Yet, according to Jonathan Clark, this is not a result of the romanticisation of nature, rather it is that Bramham paints the things that are near by as subject matter is incidental to him.

In this it is possible to see some connection with other painters associated with the School of London, as there is a comparison to be made between the coupling of the formalist interest in painting as a medium alongside a direct engagement with aspects of the real world in Bramham and artists such as Lucian Freud and Frank Auerbach. In this respect Bramham is essentially a realist painter.

Bramham is also well regarded for his drawing skills, and exhibited alongside Paula Rego, Auerbach, Dennis Creffield and sixty other artists in the exhibition Drawing Inspiration: Contemporary British Drawing, held at the Abbot Hall Art Gallery, Kendal, in 2006.
