= Tony Bevan =

British painter

Tony Bevan RA (born 1951) is a British painter, known for his psychologically charged images of people at the edge of respectable society.

== Biography ==
Bevan was born in Bradford, Yorkshire. He studied at Bradford School of Art from 1968 to 1971, followed by Goldsmiths' College, London from 1971 to 1974, and the Slade School of Fine Art from 1974 to 1976. He was elected to the Royal Academy of Arts in London as an Academician in 2007.

Bevan came to prominence as an artist in the 1980s, taking part in the ICA show Before it hits the floor in 1982, Problems of Picturing, curated by Sarah Kent and held at the Serpentine Gallery in London in 1982-83, and The British Art Show, a touring exhibition of contemporary art, in 1984. This was followed by exhibitions mainly in the USA and Germany, including the LA Louver Gallery, California, in 1989, 1992 and 1995, and Kunsthalle, Kiel, in 1988, Staatsgalerie Moderner Kunst Haus der Kunst, Munich, in 1989, and Galerie Wittenbrink, in Munich, during the 1990s. Bevan also exhibits in Australia, at Niagara Galleries, Melbourne and Liverpool Street Gallery, Sydney, with recent solo shows in 2013.

In 2006 Bevan was invited to explore the printmaking technique of monoprints, a technique he had not previously tried, at the Scuola de Grafica in Venice. This resulted in over 80 images which were subsequently shown at Marlborough Fine Art in London, and marked the beginning of an interest in printmaking Bevan retains to this day.

Bevan has work in many major art collections around the world, including Arts Council England, the Israel Museum, Jerusalem, the British Museum, the Louisiana Museum in Denmark, Museum of Contemporary Art, Los Angeles, the Museum of Modern Art, New York and the Tate. He is represented by Marlborough Fine Art, L.A. Louver and Ben Brown Fine Arts, London.

== Style and influences ==
Bevan's subject matter focuses predominantly on the human figure. In doing so he uses a distressed linear style, which has been described as graphic and even deliberately crude. In the estimation of the art critic Sarah Kent, writing in 1985, this quality is a reflection of the social times in which Bevan finds himself, with the highly charged political climate of the mid-1980s in Britain, under the government of Margaret Thatcher, provoking artists like Bevan to 'roll over and play dead, to escape into fantasy, or to stand and fight'. The implication of Kent's analysis was that Bevan chose to stand and fight.

What this meant in practical terms was that Bevan produced psychologically charged images of people at the edge of respectable society, in a style that drew influence from sources ranging from early twentieth century New Objectivity artists, to Francis Bacon and the painters of the School of London, and the ephemera of street graffiti and popular culture. Indeed, commenting on Bevan's entry in the Whitechapel Open exhibition in 1992 art critic David Cohen described, as a compliment, one of Bevan's self-portraits as looking like 'a cross between Lucian Freud and Dennis the Menace... arousing associations of delinquency and social unrest.'

In addition to his 'rough, jagged lines', Bevan's work is characterised by a limitation placed on his colour palette, and his addition of grit or sand to the acrylic paint he uses. Although this handling has led some critics to associate Bevan with the School of London, this connection has been disputed, most notably by Grace Glueck in The New York Times. So it is possibly more accurate to link Bevan to artists like Steven Campbell, Ken Currie and Peter Howson, who also came to prominence in the 1980s, and like Bevan worked under a noticeable influence from 'expressionistic' forms of German art. Bevan himself wrote his thesis at art school on the highly expressive German eighteenth-century sculptor, Franz Xaver Messerschmidt, and acknowledged Messerschmidt's influence on his own work. In an interview in 2011 Bevan stated: 'I've used elements [of Messerschmidt] in the past, but recently I decided to work specifically through these sculptures. So I used formal elements from the sculptures to make self-portraits because it's believed that a lot of these sculptures were self-portraits. So I used the formal elements of his to work through my own self-portraits.'

As with the Scottish artists Campbell, Currie and Howson, there is a clear interest in attempting to represent an internal or psychological reality in Bevan's paintings by finding visual equivalents to a subject's state of mind. It is also notable that Bevan's most frequent subject in his paintings is himself, which again adds weight to the argument he is seeking to create 'psychological portraits'. Indeed, this is a quality Bevan himself notes, admitting that he was heavily influenced as a student by a book called Psychoanalytic Approaches to Art (unidentified).

Paradoxically, despite being described as having a 'graphic style', it was not until relatively recently that Bevan began making prints. This followed a two-week professional workshop at the Scuola de Grafica in Venice with the printmakers Simon Marsh and Mike Taylor in 2006. Writing in the catalogue for the exhibition of these prints in London in 2007 Marco Livingstone noted they possessed many of the same physical and psychological qualities of Bevan's paintings, writing that they "reveal as much in their materiality as in the imaginative and emotional dimension of their imagery".
