= Piccalilli =

British relish of chopped pickled vegetables and spices

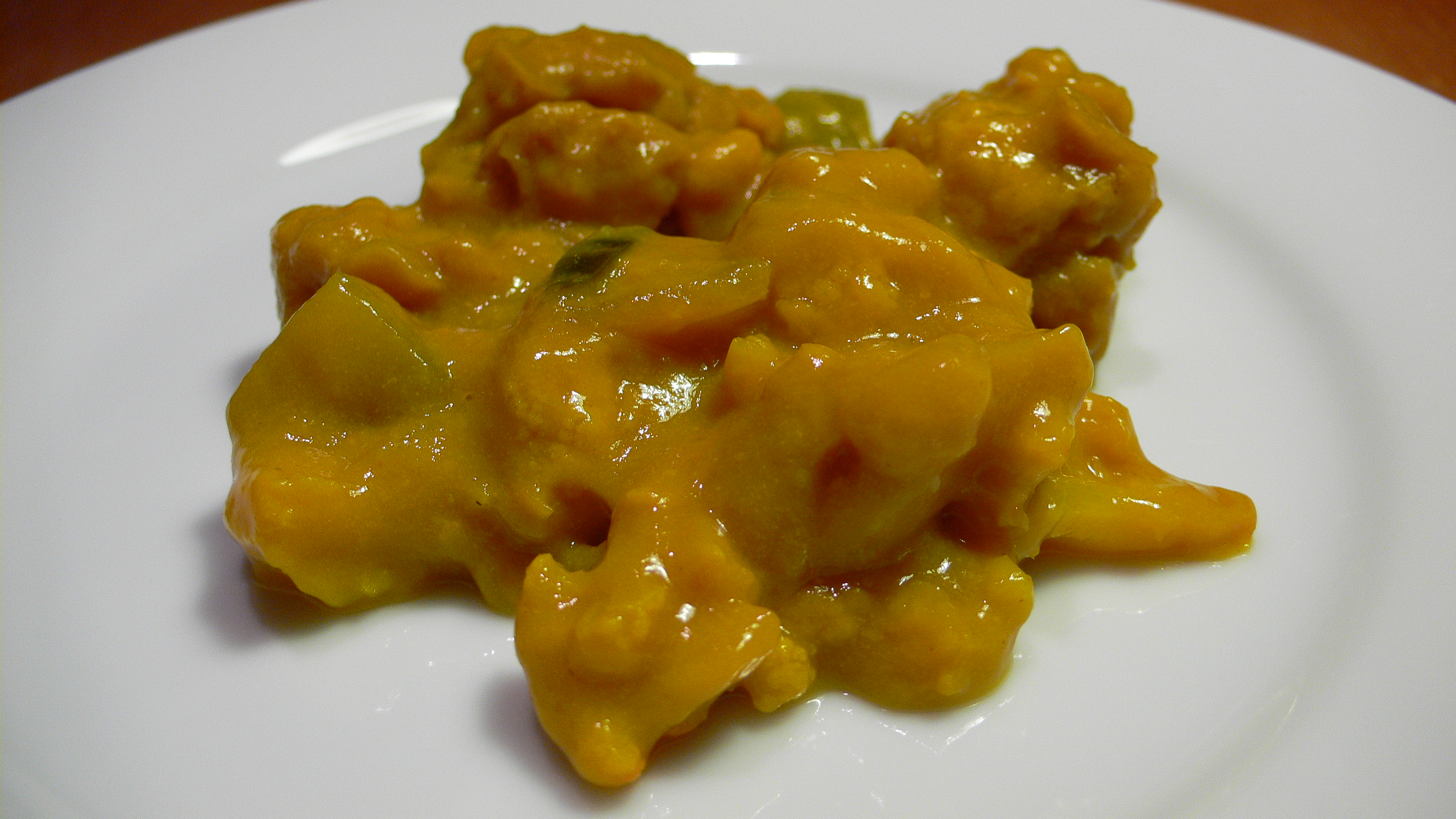
- Place of origin: England
- Serving temperature: Cold
- Main ingredients: Pickled vegetables and spices

Piccalilli is a relish from English cuisine made from chopped and pickled vegetables and spices. It was adapted from Indian pickles in the 18th century, with the style being intentionally exotic but adapted to English taste. Early versions were published by Hannah Glasse in 1758 and by Elizabeth Raffald in 1769; they salted the vegetables and left them to dry, before adding vinegar. A piccalilli has been sold commercially by Crosse & Blackwell from the 19th century onwards. The English diaspora brought the relish to North America, where it has been adapted into forms such as "neon relish", and back to the British Raj in India.

== Etymology ==
The earliest known recipes for piccalilli are English. The name's derivation is not known, but may be based on English 'pickle' (food preserved in vinegar), which in turn is from Middle Dutch pekel with a similar meaning. The Oxford English Dictionary traces 'piccalilli' to 1758, when Hannah Glasse described how "to make Paco-Lilla, or India Pickle" in her book The Art of Cookery Made Plain and Easy. An apparently earlier reference is in Anne Blencowe's Receipt Book, handwritten c. 1694, which has "To Pickle Lila, an Indian Pickle" credited to Lord Kilmory. The more familiar form of the word appears in 1769, in Elizabeth Raffald's The Experienced English Housekeeper, as "To make Indian pickle, or Piccalillo". Richard Briggs, in his 1788 The English Art of Cookery, similarly calls it "Picca Lillo". The spelling "piccalilli" can be seen in an advertisement in a 1789 edition of The Times.

== By nation ==
=== In England ===
==== 18th century ====
Piccallilli was created in England in the colonial era as an adaptation of Indian pickles. The style was intentionally exotic but adapted to English taste. Anil Paralkar, a scholar of culture, describes it as an appropriation.

Hannah Glasse's recipe calls for "race-ginger" and long pepper to be soaked separately in water overnight, then sliced, salted and left to dry in the sun. The same quantity of garlic is to be sliced, and then repeatedly salted, left to stand, and washed, before being left to dry. These are then added, with mustard seed and turmeric, to a large quantity of white wine vinegar. Vegetables and fruits such as white cabbage, cauliflower, cucumber, melon, apple, French beans, or plums, salted and dried, are then added. She suggests adding more vegetables and fruits "as the things come in season", also adding more vinegar when needed.

Elizabeth Raffald's recipe calls for white cabbage, cauliflower, cucumber, radish pods, kidney beans, and beetroot "or any other thing you commonly pickle". These are to be pickled with salt and left in sunshine or "before the fire for three days to dry". She then adds mustard seed, turmeric, and ale vinegar, boils it, and leaves it to stand for 12 days. She then boils more vinegar with spices, and adds that and some garlic to the pickled vegetables.

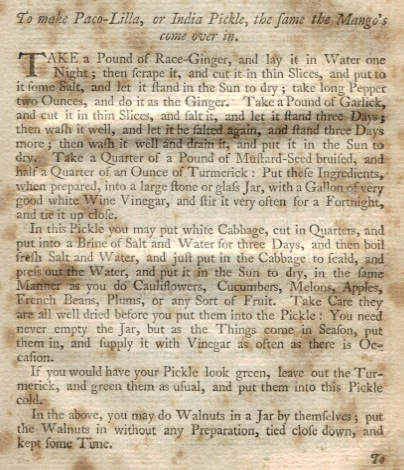
Hannah Glasse's recipe for
"Paco-Lilla or India Pickle", 1758

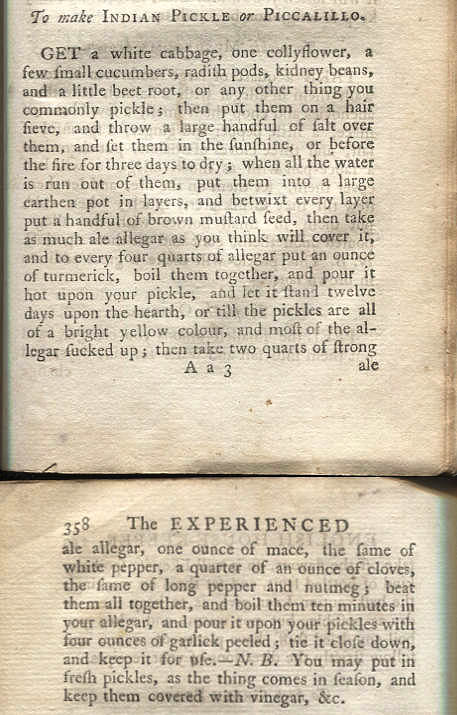
Elizabeth Raffald's recipe for
"Indian pickle or Piccalillo", 1775

==== 19th and early 20th centuries ====
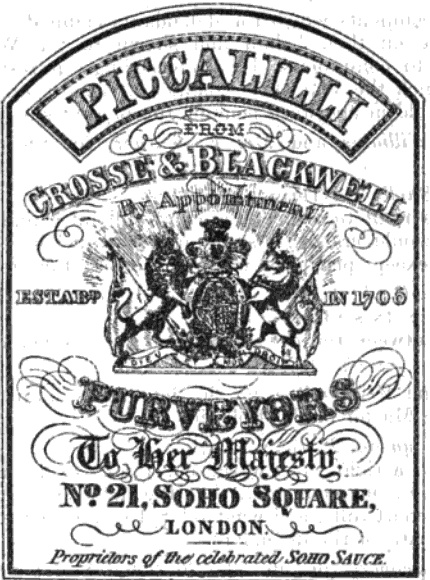
Piccalilli label, Crosse & Blackwell, c. 1867

Piccalilli has been sold commercially by Crosse & Blackwell from the 19th century onwards.

In the British Raj, Anglo-Indian cooks tried to replicate the piccalilli that they had enjoyed in Britain, demonstrating in the words of the Hindustan Times "how food travels easily across borders and becomes a vessel for cultural exchange". Cauliflower in particular grew well in North India but not in the Deccan, so supplies for colonial cooks in Poona and Bombay (modern Pune and Mumbai) were limited. In 1913, a cauliflower could be purchased in Poona in the winter months for between 4 and 8 annas. The cooks made large barrels of the pickle with cauliflowers and vegetable marrows.

==== Modern ====
Modern British recipes for piccalilli contain vegetables such as cauliflower, onion, runner bean, carrot, and courgette. They are seasoned with spices such as ginger, garlic, coriander, mustard and turmeric, and pickled in vinegar, salt, and sugar. Some use shallots in place of onions, and add some chili pepper.

The English celebrity chef Hugh Fearnley-Whittingstall proposes using the vegetables cauliflower, cucumber, onion, and carrot, spiced with mustard, turmeric, ginger, cumin, nutmeg, chili, cayenne, and black pepper, and pickled in salt, sugar, and cider vinegar. He uses cornflour to thicken the mixture.

=== In North America ===
In Canada, piccalilli is consumed by the English diaspora; the cookery writer Eric Akis has published a recipe for it in the Times Colonist.

In the Northeastern United States, commercial piccalillis are made with a base of sweet peppers or green tomatoes. This style is somewhat similar to sweet pepper relish, the piccalilli being distinguished by being a darker red or green and, like British piccalilli, having larger chunks and being slightly sweeter.

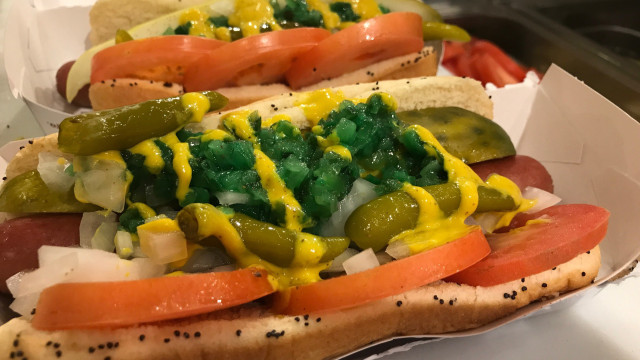
A hotdog with green "neon relish"

In the Midwestern United States, commercial piccalillis are based on finely chopped gherkins. Bright green and on the sweet side, they are often used as a condiment for Chicago-style hot dogs. This style is sometimes called "neon relish".

In the Southern United States, chow-chow, a relish with a base of chopped green (unripe) tomatoes, is offered. This relish may include onions, bell peppers, cabbage, green beans, and other vegetables. While not similar to other piccalillis, chow-chow is often called as such and the terms may be used interchangeably.

== See also ==
- Pickling – Procedure of preserving food in brine or vinegar
- Acar – Southeast Asian pickled vegetables
- Achaar – Pickled varieties of vegetable and fruit
