= Floating island (dessert) =

Dessert of soft meringue on crème anglaise

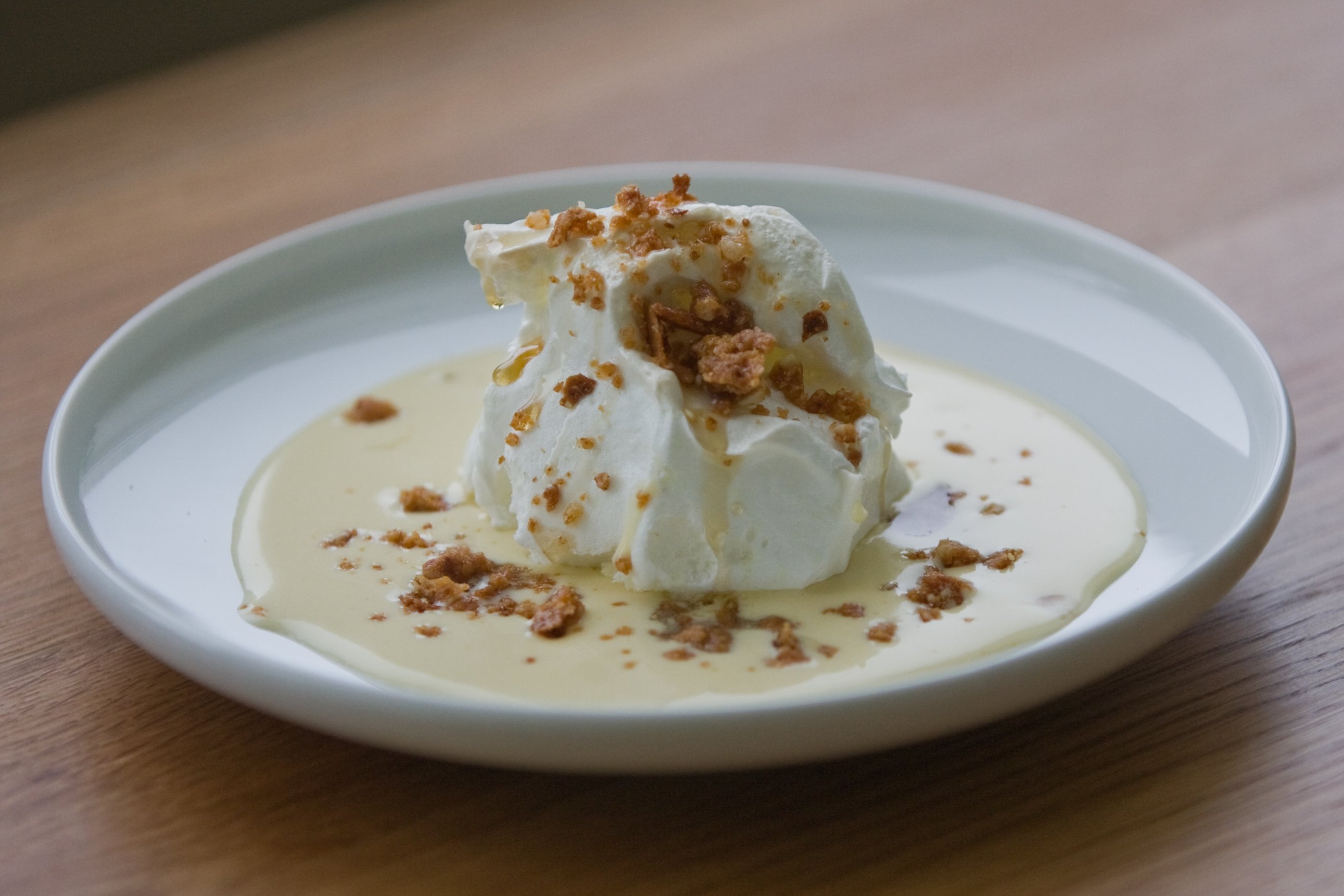
- Course: Dessert
- Place of origin: France
- Main ingredients: meringue (egg whites, sugar and vanilla extract), crème anglaise (egg yolks, vanilla, milk, sugar)

A floating island or île flottante (French: [il flɔtɑ̃t]) is a dessert consisting of soft meringue floating on crème anglaise (a liquid vanilla custard). The meringue used is baked in a bain-marie. It may be served at room temperature or chilled.

== Terminology ==
Œufs à la neige ("eggs in snow", [øz‿a la nɛʒ]) is a similar dessert where the meringue is in egg-sized pieces and poached, rather than in one large baked piece.

== History ==
The earliest known English-language reference to a floating island is in The Art of Cookery Made Plain and Easy (1747) by the English cookery writer Hannah Glasse. Her recipe, entitled The Flooting Island [sic], is made with sweetened thick cream, sack and lemon peel whipped into a froth, then layered with thin slices of bread alternating with jelly, piled high with the stiffened froth. Fruits and sweetmeats are arranged in a ring around the edge of the dish that is presented as a centerpiece for the table with candles all around it.

A 1771 letter from the American founding father Benjamin Franklin reported eating a floating island at a dinner. An 1847 American cookbook lists floating island as a Fourth of July celebration dessert.

The historical form was quite different in England than in France, where it was known as Île Flottante. Some scholars say that today's dish more closely resembles the 18th-century French Île Flottante than the elaborate cake and jelly constructions of English cuisine, while others say that the early French versions were not made with meringue, but layers of liquor soaked spongecake or brioche served in custard sauce (or berry puree).

Elizabeth Raffald's 18th-century recipe published in The Experienced English Housekeeper seeks to create a pastoral winter landscape:

"beat the white of an egg to a strong froth, and roll a sprig of myrtle in it to imitate snow ... let it stand till it is quite cold and stiff, then lay on rock candied-sweetmeats upon the top of your jelly, and sheep and swans to pick at the myrtle; stick green sprigs in two or three places on top of your jelly, amongst your shapes".

According to Larousse Gastronomique the dessert was being served a little less often by the time the encyclopedia was published in 1938, and its writers expressed regret because the dish is "excellent". The version recorded in the Larousse Gastronomique was made with stale Savoy biscuits sliced thin and soaked in kirsch and maraschino, layered with apricot marmalade, and a garnish of chopped almonds and currants. The layers were assembled to form a type of cake that was frosted with chantilly cream, with either custard or berry puree poured over the whole thing.

== Preparation ==
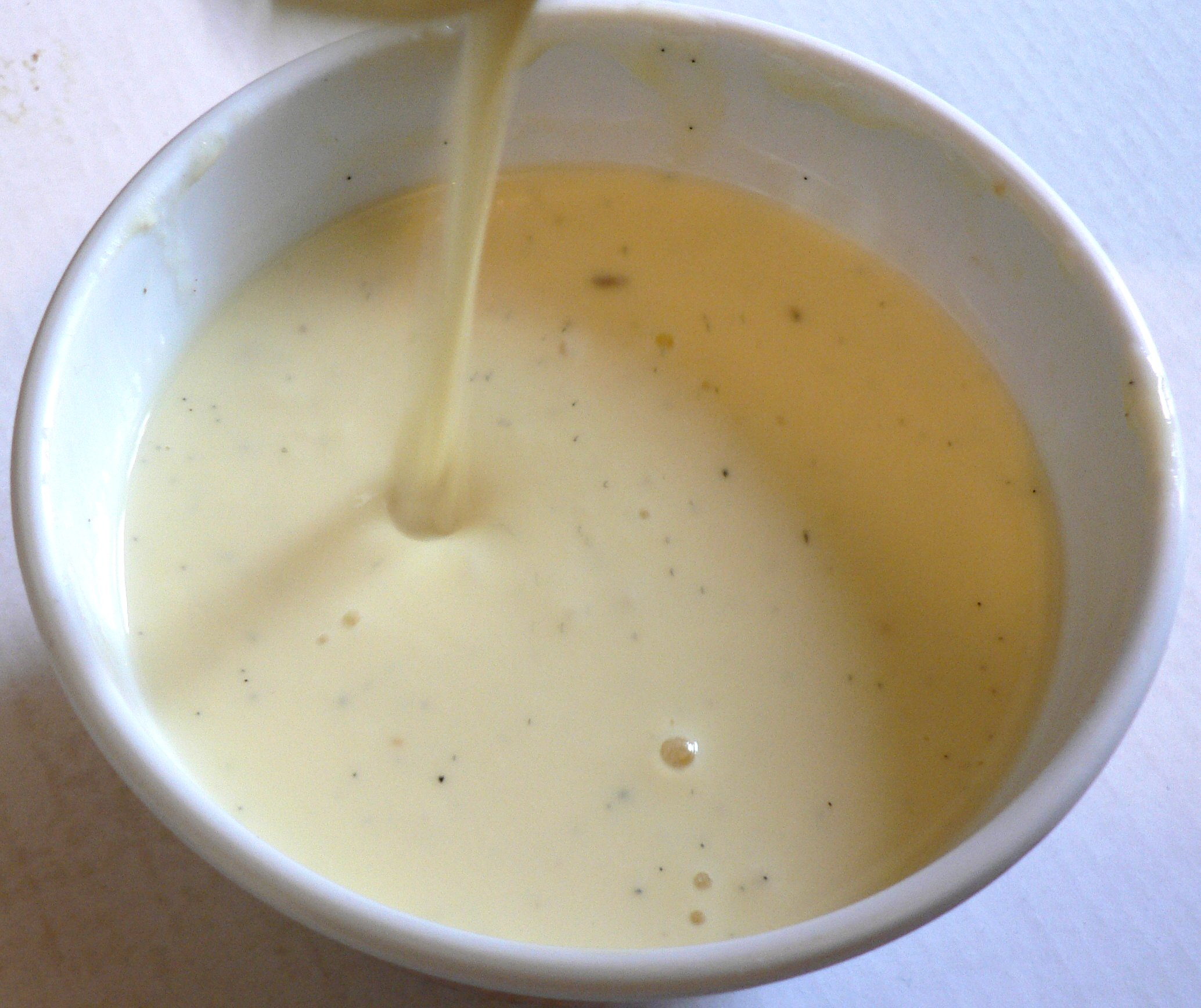
Crème anglaise, the base of floating island

Floating island typically consists of a meringue served floating on a light custard sauce. Some variations invert this by using a thicker sauce served on top of the meringue instead.

To make the meringue, the egg whites are beaten with sugar and poured into a mold that may be lined with caramelised sugar. It is then steamed in the oven in a bain-marie. Once the meringue is cooked and chilled, the sauce is poured on a serving plate, and the unmolded meringue placed on the sauce to "float".

== See also ==
- List of custard desserts
- List of dairy products
- List of French desserts
