= The Lady's Complete Guide =

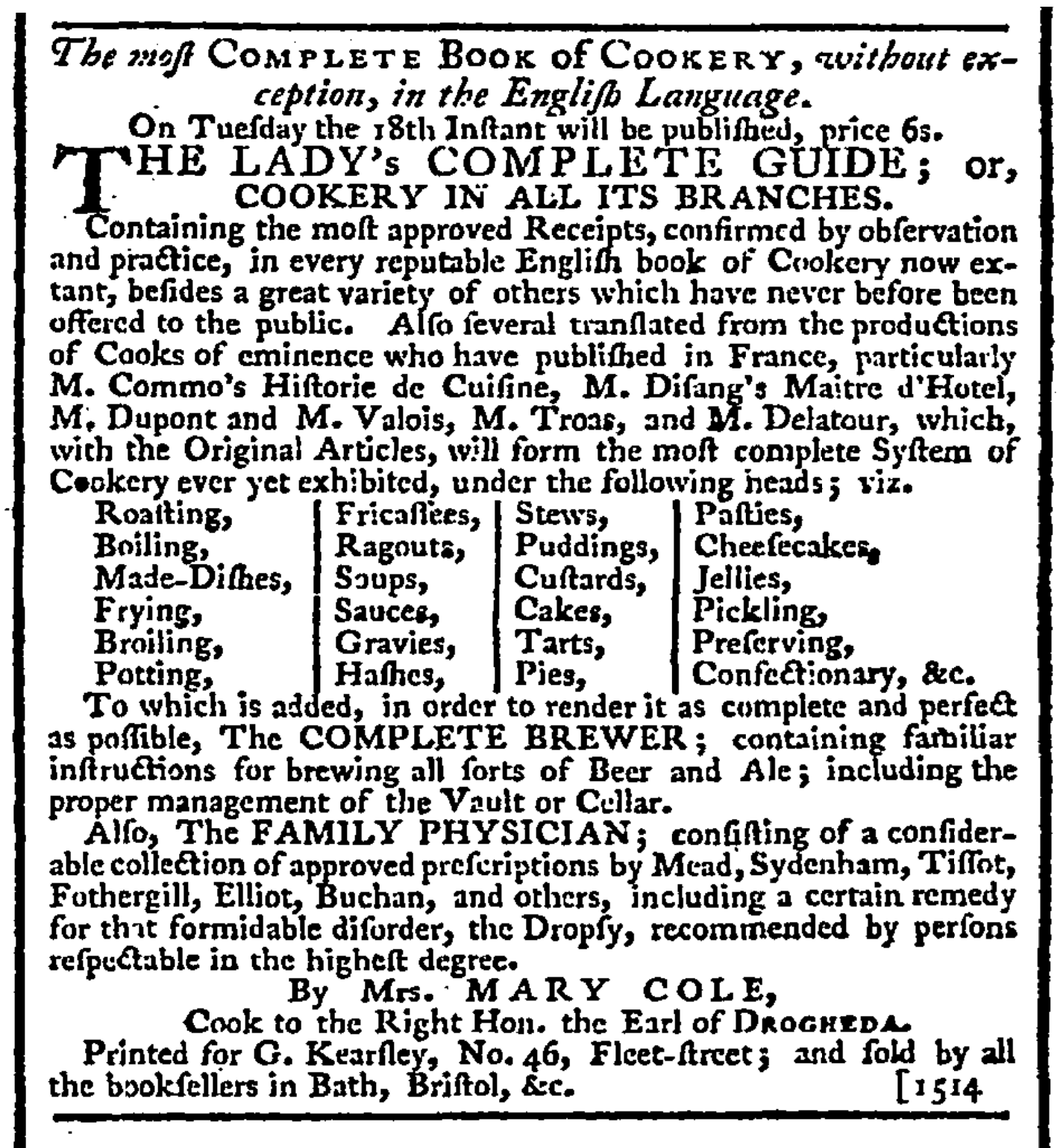
Advertisement for first edition, 1788

The Lady's Complete Guide, or Cookery in All its Branches by Mary Cole (fl 1788–1791) is a pioneering cookery book, the first in English that systematically ascribed recipes to their authors, where known. It was first published in 1788 and was followed by revised editions in 1789 and 1791.

== Author ==
No biographical details are known about Mary Cole other than that she was the long-serving cook to the Earl of Drogheda.

== Book ==
The first edition was published in 1788 as The Lady's Complete Guide, or Cookery in all its Branches; Containing the most approved Receipts, confirmed by Observation and Practice, in every reputable English Book of Cookery now extant. According to the title page, and to contemporary advertisements for the book, it incorporates recipes "translated from the Productions of Cooks of Eminence who have published in France", specifically the Duke de Nivernois, M. Commo's Histoire de Cuisine, M. Disang's Maitre d'Hotel, M. Dupont, M. Valois, M. Troas and M. Delatour, "with their respective Names to each Receipt". A. W. Oxford in his 1913 study English Cookery Books to the Year 1850 and Alan Davidson in The Oxford Companion to Food both comment that this is curious, as none of the names are known to the standard bibliographers of French writings on cookery. Davidson suggests that they may have been inventions, designed to satirise "those English authors who made a great to-do about following French authors".

The innovative aspect of the book was the writer's scrupulousness in crediting the original authors, where known, and giving details of books and page numbers where the originals could be found. She wrote in her preface:

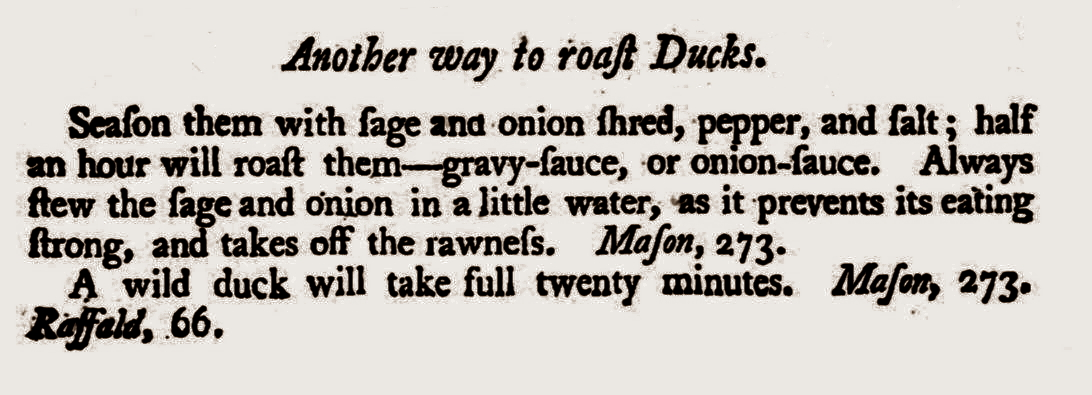
One of Cole's recipes, giving details of its original sources

If all the writers upon Cookery had acknowledged from whence they took their receipts, as I do, they would have acted with more candour by the public. Their vanity, to pass for Authors, instead of Compilers, has not added to their reputation.

Among her predecessors, Cole singled out for censure Hannah Glasse, Charlotte Mason, Elizabeth Raffald and John Farley for passing off other people's recipes as their own. (Note: Cole referred to Hannah Glasse's The Art of Cookery Made Plain and Easy (1747), Charlotte Mason's The Lady's Assistant for Regulating and Supplying her Table (1775), Elizabeth Raffald's The Experienced English Housekeeper (1769) and John Farley's The London Art of Cookery (1783).) Cole herself was evidently the victim of plagiarism three years after the publication of the third edition of her book: a London publisher brought out Domestic Economy, or A Complete System of English Housekeeping (1794), attributed to "Maximilian Hazlemore", which consists of the text of Cole's book in its entirety.

The main part of The Lady's Complete Guide comprised 30 chapters describing techniques and giving recipes for roasting, boiling, "made-dishes" (of beef, lamb, game etc.), frying, broiling, potting, fricassees, ragouts, soups, sauces, gravies, hashes, stews, puddings, custards, cakes, tarts, pies, pasties, cheesecakes, jellies, pickling, preserving, "confectionary" and vegetables. In addition to the culinary chapters, Cole included supplementary sections on "The Art of Brewing" and "The Family Physician".

The original 1788 edition of The Lady's Complete Guide ran to 564 pages. The revised second and third editions were expanded in content, but were reset to allow more lines to a page; the second edition contained 564 pages and the third ("very much improved", according to the title page), 460. A reproduction of the British Library's copy of the original 18th-century book was published in 2005.

== Notes, references and sources ==
=== Sources ===
- Cole, Mary (1788). The Lady's Complete Guide (first ed.). London: G. Kearsley. OCLC 969467164.
- Cole, Mary (1789). The Lady's Complete Guide (second ed.). London: G. Kearsley. OCLC 1157722937.
- Cole, Mary (1791). The Lady's Complete Guide (third ed.). London: G. Kearsley. OCLC 1157577211.
- Davidson, Alan (1999). The Oxford Companion to Food. Oxford: Oxford University Press. ISBN 978-0-19-211579-9.
- Oxford, Arnold Whitaker (1913). English Cookery Books to the Year 1850. Oxford: Oxford University Press. OCLC 1040241908.
