= A Proper Newe Booke of Cokerye =

1545 English book of recipes

A Proper Newe Booke of Cokerye is a book of recipes, seasons for meat and listing of courses and dishes for service on fish days and non-fish days written for women running their own households by an unknown author. The text was published in London and survives in three editions: 1545 (held at the University of Glasgow), 1557-1558 (held at Corpus Christi College, Cambridge) and two later editions, one of 1575 (held in the British Library). It is a relatively small volume, beginning with a list of meats and their seasons, followed by a listing of dinners and suggested dishes for service for both flesh and fish days. After this comes a list of 49 recipes mostly covering meat dishes and pies, though there are a small number of sweet dishes, including "A tart of Bourage Flowers", "pye of aloes" and a "tart of Marygoldes, Primroses, or Cowslips".

The book is important as it is one of the first cookery books in English aimed at a more general reader and also at a more female audience who might not have cooked before. As result the recipes are fuller than their medieval equivalents, with indications of amounts for ingredients and cooking times.

== Modern editions ==
- A Proper Newe Booke of Cokerye; edited by Catherine Frances Frere, W. Heffer & Sons Ltd, London, 1913
- A Proper Newe Booke of Cokerye: Margaret Parker's Cookery Book; Anne Ahmed; Chihiro Mizuta (illus.), Corpus Christi College Cambridge, 2002 ISBN 978-0950426136
- facsimile version of the original text with a parallel version in modern English
- A Proper Newe Booke of Cokerye; edited by Jane Hugget; Bristol: Stuart, ISBN 1858040914

== References and sources ==
=== Sources ===
- Oxford, Arnold Whitaker (1913). English Cookery Books to the Year 1850. Oxford: Oxford University Press. OCLC 1040241908.
