= The English Art of Cookery =

1788 English cookery book

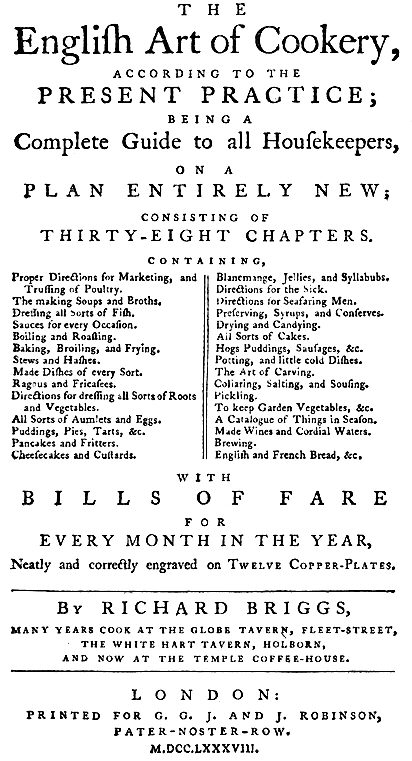
Title page of The English Art of Cookery. First edition, 1788

The English Art of Cookery is a cookery book of English cuisine by the tavern cook Richard Briggs, first published in 1788.

It is an early source for recipes for toad in a hole, mushroom ketchup and puff pastry, and examples of Anglo-Indian influence.

== Context ==
The title page describes Richard Briggs as being "many Years Cook at the Globe Tavern, Fleet-street, the White-Hart Tavern, Holborn, [and] now at the Temple Coffee-house."

== Book ==
Briggs gave the book the title The English Art of Cookery according to the present practice; being a complete guide to all housekeepers on a plan entirely new. In his preface, dated Oct. 1, 1788, he explains that his intended audience is (commanded) servants rather than aristocrats: "I presume to offer the following Sheets to the Public, in hopes that they will find the Directions and Receipts more intelligible than in most Books of the Kind. I have bestowed every Pains to render them easily practicable, and adapted to the Capacities of those who may be ordered to use them." The historian Gilly Lehmann comments that in this preface, Briggs was stressing "his simple style in terms reminiscent of Hannah Glasse". The book was expensive, its price of 7 shillings placing it at "the upper end of the market."

The book contains a high proportion of French recipes for its period, Elizabeth Raffald's The Experienced English Housekeeper in comparison having far fewer. French or partly French titles include "Poulet a la Braize", "Soup a la Reine" and "Rump of Beef a la Doube". Despite these elegant foreign dishes, Briggs felt able to include homely English foods such as toad in a hole, though it did include "beaten ginger, and a little grated nutmeg", and used a "veiney piece of beef" rather than sausages.

The book contains several examples of Anglo-Indian influence. In the Pickling chapter, there are "Mock Ginger", "Melon Mangoes", and "Elder Shoots in Imitation of Bamboo". Briggs gives recipes for curries of veal and of chicken, calling for the use of "curric powder".

=== Approach ===
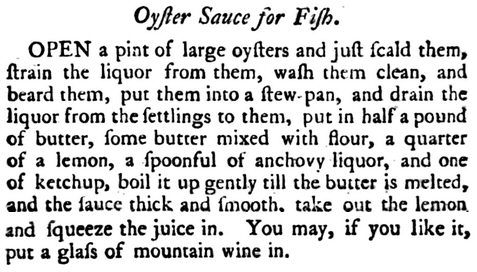
Recipe for "Oyster Sauce for Fish"

The book is strictly organised into 38 chapters with clearly distinct themes. Many of the chapters have an introductory paragraph stating "Proper rules to be observed in" its theme.

The recipes are given as names of dishes, such as "Oyster Sauce for Fish", with a paragraph of instructions. There are no lists of ingredients. Quantities are given where needed, in whatever measure is convenient, as "a pint of large oysters", "half a pound of butter", "a quarter of a lemon", or "a spoonful of anchovy liquor". Cooking instructions rely on the observation of the cook, as "boil it up gently till the butter is melted, and the sauce thick and smooth".

=== Contents ===
Page numbers apply to the first edition.

1. Marketing 1
2. Soups 28
3. Fish 63
4. Sauces 122
5. Boiling 137
6. Roasting 149
7. Baking 174
8. Broiling 179
9. Frying 185
10. Stews and Hashes 192
11. Made Dishes 215
12. Ragous 300
13. Fricasees 307
14. Roots and Vegetables 315
15. Aumlets and Eggs 345, Cheese 354
16. Puddings 357
17. Pies 396, Pettit Patties 430, Tarts, Tartlets, and Puffs 434
18. Pancakes and Fritters 440
19. Cheesecakes and Custards 449
20. Blancmange, Creams, and Flummery 455
21. Jellies and Syllabubs 468
22. Directions for those that attend the Sick 479
23. Directions for Seafaring Men 489
24. Preserving 499
25. Syrups and Conserves 514
26. Drying and Candying 516
27. Cakes 525
28. Hogs Puddings, Sausages, &c. 541
29. Potting 546, Little Cold Dishes 557
30. Carving 559
31. Collaring 561
32. Salting and Sousing 566
33. Pickling 573
34. To Keep Garden Vegetables and Fruits 597, A Catalogue of Fish, Game, Poultry, Fruit, and Garden Vegetables, in Season every Month in the Year 602
35. Wines 611
36. Cordial Waters 621
37. Brewing 631
38. Baking 652

=== Illustrations ===
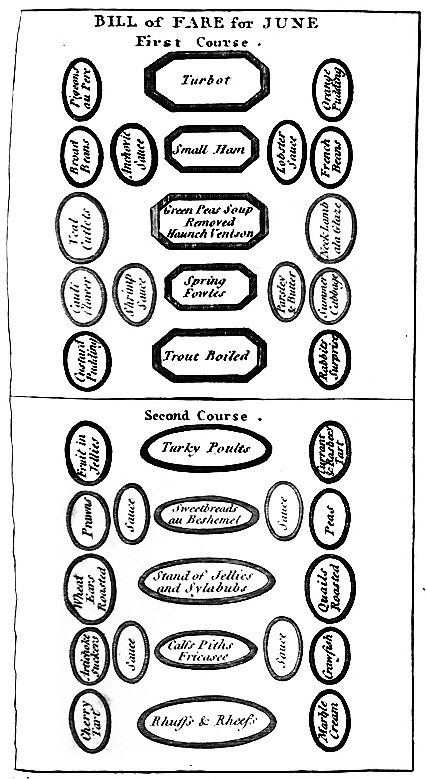
"Bill of Fare for June", including turbot, venison, sweetbreads au bechamel, jellies and syllabubs, and ruffs and reeves

The book was illustrated with 12 copper-plate engravings of Bills of Fare for the 12 months of the year, each one being a table layout of oval or octagonal dishes. These plates preceded the first chapter.

=== Recipes ===
Many species of bird were eaten in eighteenth century England; Briggs describes how to roast "Ruffs and Reeves" from Lincolnshire and the Isle of Ely; Ortolan buntings; larks; plovers; wheatears from the South Downs, as well as wild ducks, woodcocks and snipes.

The book contains recipes for ketchups made with mushrooms or walnuts. It also describes how to make puff pastry, which Briggs used in both savoury and sweet dishes.

=== Editions ===
The book appeared in the following editions.

- 1788 1st Ed. London: G.G.J. and J. Robinson
- 1790? Cork: J. Connor
- 1791 2nd Ed. London: G.G.J. and J. Robinson
- 1791 Dublin: P. Byrne
- 1792 Philadelphia: W. Spotswood, R. Campbell, and B. Johnson as The New Art of Cookery
- 1794 3rd Ed. London: G.G.J. and J. Robinson
- 1798 Dublin: P. Byrne
- 1798 2nd American Ed. Boston: W. Spotswood
- 1806 Dublin:

== Reception ==
The Monthly Review of 1789 "confessed that there may be, and actually are, subjects, both above and below our reach; and we now acknowledge that cookery is one of them." It agreed with the proverb that the proof of the pudding was in the eating, but "none of the corps [of reviewers] will venture to say how the pudding should be made."

The Critical Review, or Annals of Literature of 1790 more boldly asserted that the book "appears to be a work of great merit", but, stating that cooks were "a numerous body, and we are not sufficient adepts to decide on their different pretensions", confined itself to quoting Briggs's credentials from the title page, and confirming that he "is now at the Temple Coffee-house, where we have tasted, with pleasure, several excellent dishes of his composition."
