= Manchester Mercury =

- Owner(s): 1752–1804: Joseph Harrop; 1804–1830: James Harrop
- Founder: Joseph Harrop
- Editor: 1752–1804: Joseph Harrop; 1804–1830: James Harrop
- Founded: 1752
- Ceased publication: 1830
- Political alignment: Tory
- Language: English
- Headquarters: Manchester

The Manchester Mercury was a Tory newspaper based in Manchester, England that was published from 1752 until 1830. The founder was Joseph Harrop, who was editor until his death in 1804, whereupon his son James Harrop succeeded him.
