= The Universal Cook =

1773 English cookery book

The Universal Cook is an English cookery book written in 1773 by John Townshend.

Townshend was the owner of the Greyhound Tavern in Greenwich, England. On the title page of the book, Townsend stated that he was the "Cook to his Grace the Duke of Manchester".

== Reception ==
The Universal Cook contains recipes and household advice.

One hint from Townshend was about how "To hinder wine from turning". His recommendation was to "put a pound of melted Lead in fair water into your cask pretty warm, and stop it close." In a commentary from 1807 by Thomas and Edward Percival, they note that "it must be supposed that Mr. Townshend is ignorant of the poisonous quality of Lead; but he is certainly deserving of censure for presuming to give receipts without better information."

== Editions ==
- 1st edition, London: S. Bladon, 1773.
