= Haren en Macharen =

Coordinates: 51.803095°N 5.561829°E

Haren en Macharen is a former municipality in the Dutch province of North Brabant, located north of the city of Oss. It covered the villages of Haren and Macharen.

Haren en Macharen was a separate municipality until 1821, when it became a part of Megen, Haren en Macharen (since 1994 part of Oss).
