= Megen, Haren en Macharen =

Coordinates: 51°48′38″N 5°33′56″E

Flag

Coat of arms

Megen, Haren en Macharen was a municipality in the Dutch province of North Brabant. It included the villages of Megen, Haren, and Macharen.

Megen, Haren en Macharen existed from 1821 to 1994, when it became part of Oss.
