= PTI-2 =

Chemical compound

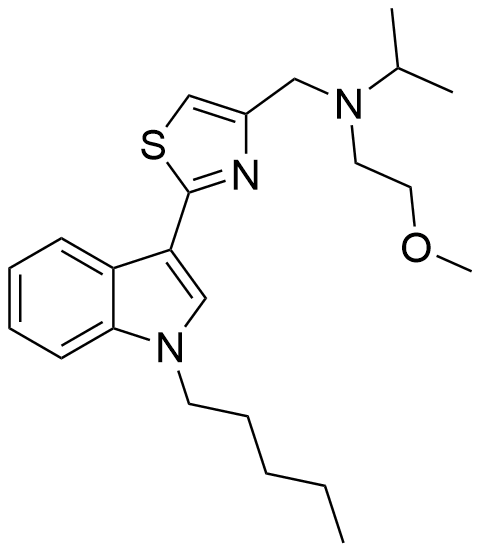

Legal status
- Legal status: CA: Schedule II; DE: NpSG (Industrial and scientific use only); UK: Class B

Identifiers
- IUPAC name: N-(2-methoxyethyl)-N-((2-(1-pentyl-1H-indol-3-yl)thiazol-4-yl)methyl)propan-2-amine
- CAS Number: 1400742-45-1
- PubChem CID: 124037377
- ChemSpider: 58827849
- UNII: W0MO88040Q

Chemical and physical data
- Formula: C_{23}H_{33}N_{3}OS
- Molar mass: 399.60 g·mol^{−1}
- 3D model (JSmol): Interactive image
- SMILES: CCCCCN1C=C(C2=CC=CC=C21)C3=NC(CN(C(C)C)CCOC)=CS3
- InChI: InChI=1S/C23H33N3OS/c1-5-6-9-12-26-16-21(20-10-7-8-11-22(20)26)23-24-19(17-28-23)15-25(18(2)3)13-14-27-4/h7-8,10-11,16-18H,5-6,9,12-15H2,1-4H3; Key:PSAKYYVEVVAWJL-UHFFFAOYSA-N

PTI-2 (SGT-49) is an indole-based synthetic cannabinoid. It is one of few synthetic cannabinoids containing a thiazole group and is closely related to PTI-1. These compounds may be viewed as simplified analogues of indole-3-heterocycle compounds originally developed by Organon and subsequently further researched by Merck.

== See also ==
- JWH-018
- LBP-1 (drug)
- PTI-1
- PTI-3
