= LBP-1 (drug) =

Chemical compound

Identifiers
- IUPAC name: 2-{4-[(3-[7-chloro-1-(oxan-4-ylmethyl)indol-3-yl]-1,2,4-oxadiazol-5-yl)methyl]piperazin-1-yl}acetamide
- CAS Number: 1050478-18-6
- PubChem CID: 25006676
- ChemSpider: 28530409
- UNII: 505K9LJ4MX
- CompTox Dashboard (EPA): DTXSID50648411

Chemical and physical data
- Formula: C_{23}H_{29}ClN_{6}O_{3}
- Molar mass: 472.97 g·mol^{−1}
- 3D model (JSmol): Interactive image
- SMILES: ClC1=C(N(CC2CCOCC2)C=C3C4=NOC(CN5CCN(CC(N)=O)CC5)=N4)C3=CC=C1
- InChI: InChI=1S/C23H29ClN6O3/c24-19-3-1-2-17-18(13-30(22(17)19)12-16-4-10-32-11-5-16)23-26-21(33-27-23)15-29-8-6-28(7-9-29)14-20(25)31/h1-3,13,16H,4-12,14-15H2,(H2,25,31); Key:AKWUNZFZIXEOPV-UHFFFAOYSA-N

LBP-1 is a drug originally developed by Organon for the treatment of neuropathic pain, It acts as a potent and selective cannabinoid receptor agonist, with high potency at both the CB_{1} and CB_{2} receptors, but low penetration of the blood–brain barrier. This makes LBP-1 peripherally selective, and while it was effective in animal models of neuropathic pain and allodynia, it did not produce cannabinoid-appropriate responding suggestive of central effects, at any dose tested.

== See also ==
- Org 28312
- Org 28611
- PTI-1
- PTI-2
