= PTI-3 =

Chemical compound

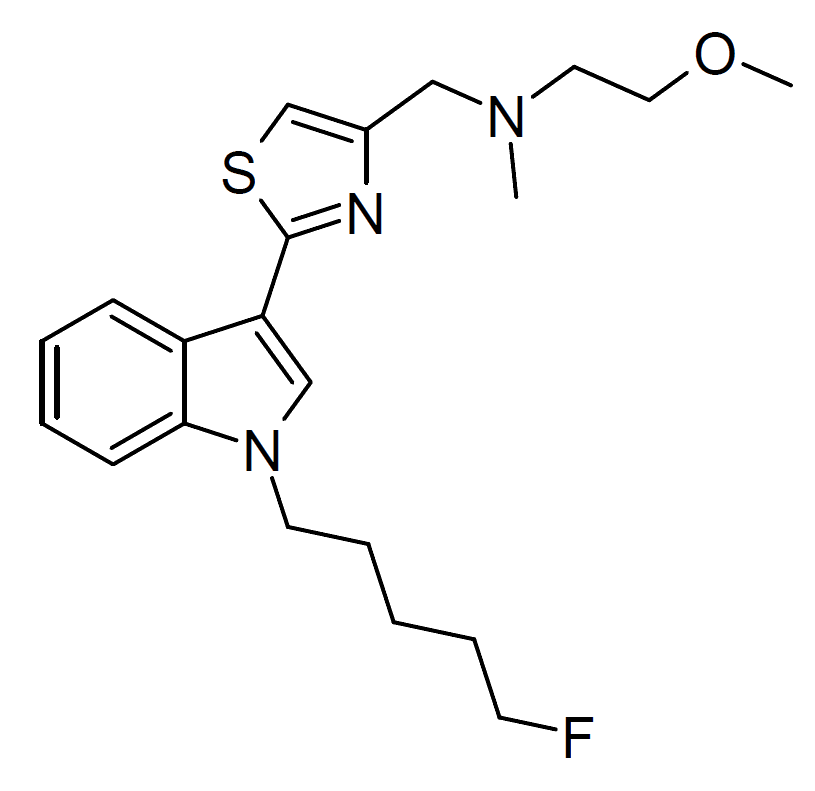

Legal status
- Legal status: CA: Schedule II; DE: NpSG (Industrial and scientific use only); UK: Class B

Identifiers
- IUPAC name: N-({2-[1-(5-fluoropentyl)-1H-indol-3-yl]-1,3-thiazol-4-yl}methyl)-2-methoxy-N-methylethanamine
- PubChem CID: 162623756
- ChemSpider: 79413292
- UNII: BE9L8378LU
- CompTox Dashboard (EPA): DTXSID701336887

Chemical and physical data
- Formula: C_{21}H_{28}FN_{3}OS
- Molar mass: 389.53 g·mol^{−1}
- 3D model (JSmol): Interactive image
- SMILES: COCCN(C)Cc1csc(n1)c1cn(CCCCCF)c2ccccc21
- InChI: InChI=1S/C21H28FN3OS/c1-24(12-13-26-2)14-17-16-27-21(23-17)19-15-25(11-7-3-6-10-22)20-9-5-4-8-18(19)20/h4-5,8-9,15-16H,3,6-7,10-14H2,1-2H3; Key:LXQIIHJBHSFWQW-UHFFFAOYSA-N

PTI-3 is an indole-3-thiazole based synthetic cannabinoid which has been sold as a designer drug. It was first identified in Hungary in 2020, and was made illegal in Italy in June 2021.

== See also ==
- PTI-1
- PTI-2
