= ORG-21465 =

Chemical compound

Clinical data
- Other names: 2β-(2,2-Dimethyl-4-morpholinyl)-3α-hydroxy-11,20-dioxo-5α-pregnan-21-yl methanesulfonate

Identifiers
- IUPAC name: [2-[(2S,3S,5S,8S,9S,10S,13S,14S,17S)-2-(2,2-dimethylmorpholin-4-yl)-3-hydroxy-10,13-dimethyl-11-oxo-1,2,3,4,5,6,7,8,9,12,14,15,16,17-tetradecahydrocyclopenta[a]phenanthren-17-yl]-2-oxoethyl]methanesulfonate
- CAS Number: 1062512-52-0
- PubChem CID: 10697702
- ChemSpider: 8873045
- CompTox Dashboard (EPA): DTXSID801029267

Chemical and physical data
- Formula: C_{27}H_{43}NO_{7}S
- Molar mass: 525.70 g·mol^{−1}
- 3D model (JSmol): Interactive image
- SMILES: O=S(=O)(OCC(=O)[C@H]5CC[C@@H]1[C@]5(C)CC(=O)[C@H]3[C@H]1CC[C@H]4C[C@H](O)[C@@H](N2CC(OCC2)(C)C)C[C@]34C)C
- InChI: InChI=1S/C28H45NO7S/c1-26(2)16-29(10-11-35-26)21-13-27(3)17(12-22(21)30)6-7-18-19-8-9-20(24(32)15-36-37(5,33)34)28(19,4)14-23(31)25(18)27/h17-22,25,30H,6-16H2,1-5H3/t17-,18-,19-,20+,21-,22-,25+,27-,28-/m0/s1; Key:SUCBEQDWLIEMEH-JDOQEMNXSA-N

ORG-21465 is a synthetic neuroactive steroid, with sedative effects resulting from its action as a GABA_{A} receptor positive allosteric modulator. It is similar to related drugs such as ORG-20599, and was similarly developed as an improved alternative to other sedative steroids such as althesin and allopregnanolone, which despite its superior properties in some respects has not proved to offer enough advantages to be accepted into clinical use.

== See also ==
- ORG-25435
