= Wobine Buijs-Glaudemans =

Dutch politician

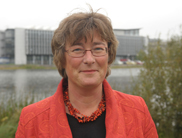
Wobine Buijs-Glaudemans, mayor of Oss

Wobine J.L. Buijs-Glaudemans (born 8 August 1960 in Tilburg) is a Dutch politician from the People's Party for Freedom and Democracy.

From 2003 to 2007, she was a member of the provincial states of North Brabant. In 2011, she was elected as mayor of Oss.
