= PTI-1 =

Chemical compound

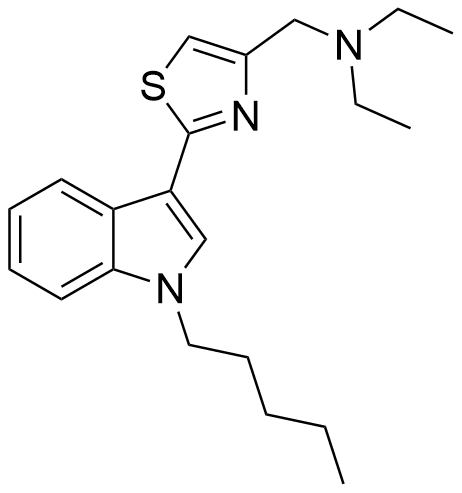

Legal status
- Legal status: CA: Schedule II; DE: NpSG (Industrial and scientific use only); UK: Class B

Identifiers
- IUPAC name: N,N-diethyl-N-((2-(1-pentyl-1H-indol-3-yl)thiazol-4-yl)methyl)ethanamine
- CAS Number: 1400742-46-2
- PubChem CID: 124037378
- ChemSpider: 32055537
- UNII: FSE9R26430

Chemical and physical data
- Formula: C_{21}H_{29}N_{3}S
- Molar mass: 355.54 g·mol^{−1}
- 3D model (JSmol): Interactive image
- SMILES: CCCCCN1C=C(C2=NC(CN(CC)CC)=CS2)C3=CC=CC=C31.Cl
- InChI: InChI=1S/C21H29N3S.ClH/c1-4-7-10-13-24-15-19(18-11-8-9-12-20(18)24)21-22-17(16-25-21)14-23(5-2)6-3;/h8-9,11-12,15-16H,4-7,10,13-14H2,1-3H3;1H; Key:NPYOTZAJIONLKZ-UHFFFAOYSA-N

PTI-1 (SGT-48) is an indole-based synthetic cannabinoid. It is one of few synthetic cannabinoids containing a thiazole group and is closely related to PTI-2. These compounds may be viewed as simplified analogues of indole-3-heterocycle compounds originally developed by Organon and subsequently further researched by Merck.

== See also ==
- JWH-018
- LBP-1 (drug)
- PTI-2
