= Megen =

- Small city
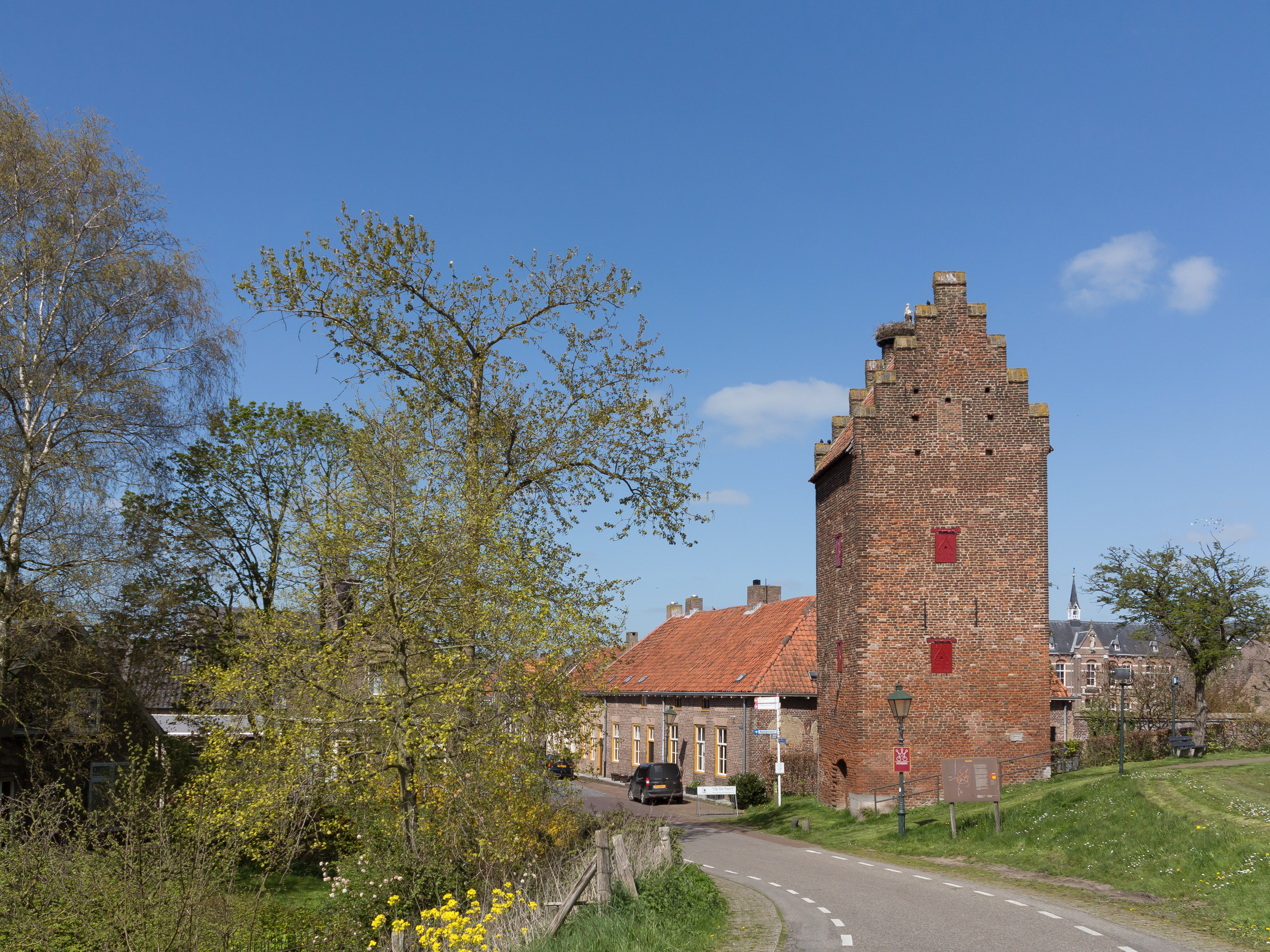
- City gate and tower for prisoners

- Coat of arms

- Location in the province of North Brabant in the Netherlands Megen (Netherlands)
- Coordinates: 51°49′13″N 5°33′45″E
- Country: Netherlands
- Province: North Brabant
- Municipality: Oss

Area
  - Total: 5.34 km^{2} (2.06 sq mi)
- Elevation: 8 m (26 ft)

Population (2021)
  - Total: 1,740
  - Density: 326/km^{2} (844/sq mi)
- Time zone: UTC+1 (CET)
  - Summer (DST): UTC+2 (CEST)
- Postal code: 5366
- Dialing code: 0412

Megen or Meghem is a small city in the southern part of the Netherlands, in the province North Brabant, close to the river Maas. It is part of the Oss municipality. The number of inhabitants is approximately 1700.

== History ==
Megen used to be the capital of the feudal County of Megen (including Haren, Macharen and Teeffelen) that was founded around 1145. City rights were obtained in 1357. Of the two castles Megen used to have, only one tower is remaining.

In 1810, the County of Megen became a municipality, to which Haren and Macharen were added in 1821. The municipality of Megen, Haren en Macharen became a part of the municipality Oss in 1994.

== Ecclesiastical history ==
In 1803 became one of the eponymous components of the Apostolic Vicariate of Ravenstein-Megen, a Roman Catholic pre-diocesan jurisdiction which was suppressed in 1853, its territory merged into the Diocese of ’s-Hertogenbosch.

Currently, there are two monasteries in Megen. One is inhabited by the Clarissas (also called the Poor Clares), followers of St. Clare of Assisi. The other is occupied by the Franciscans, followers of St. Francis of Assisi.

== Gallery ==
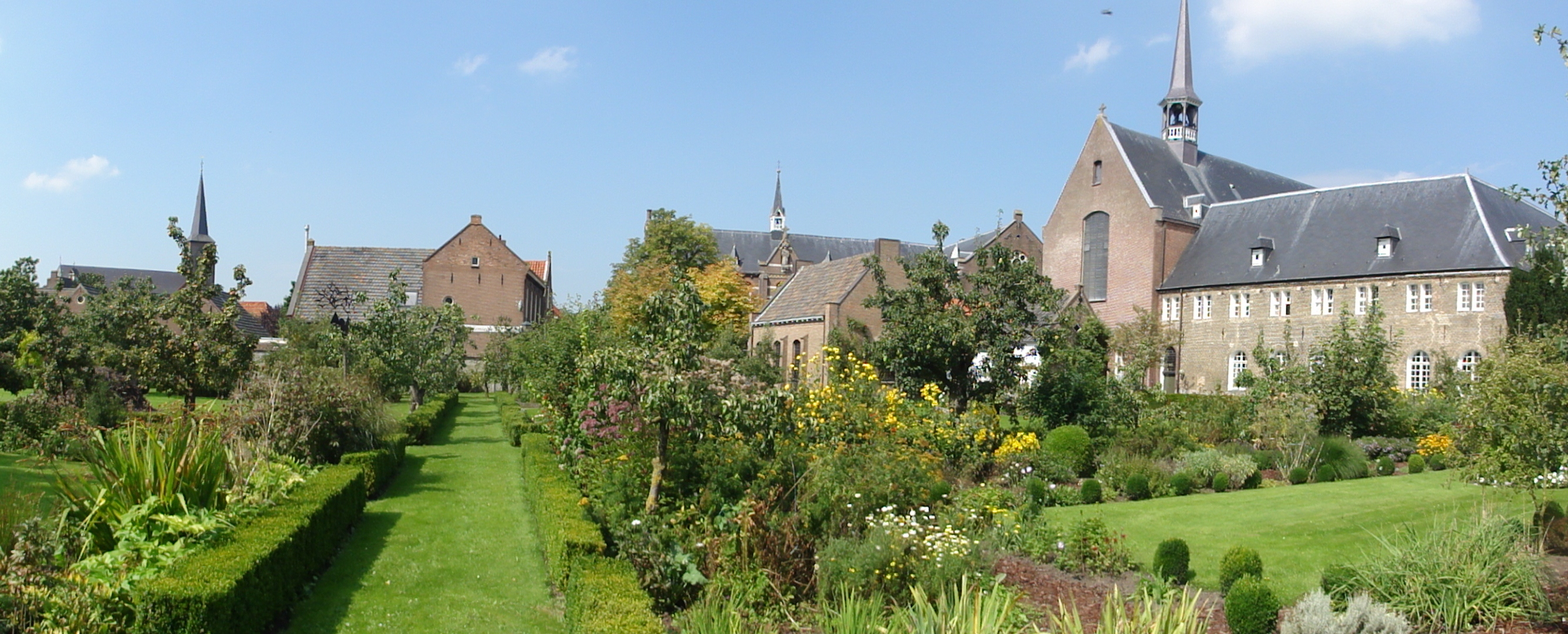
Megen panorama, church, Latin school, Franciscan monastery and its garden

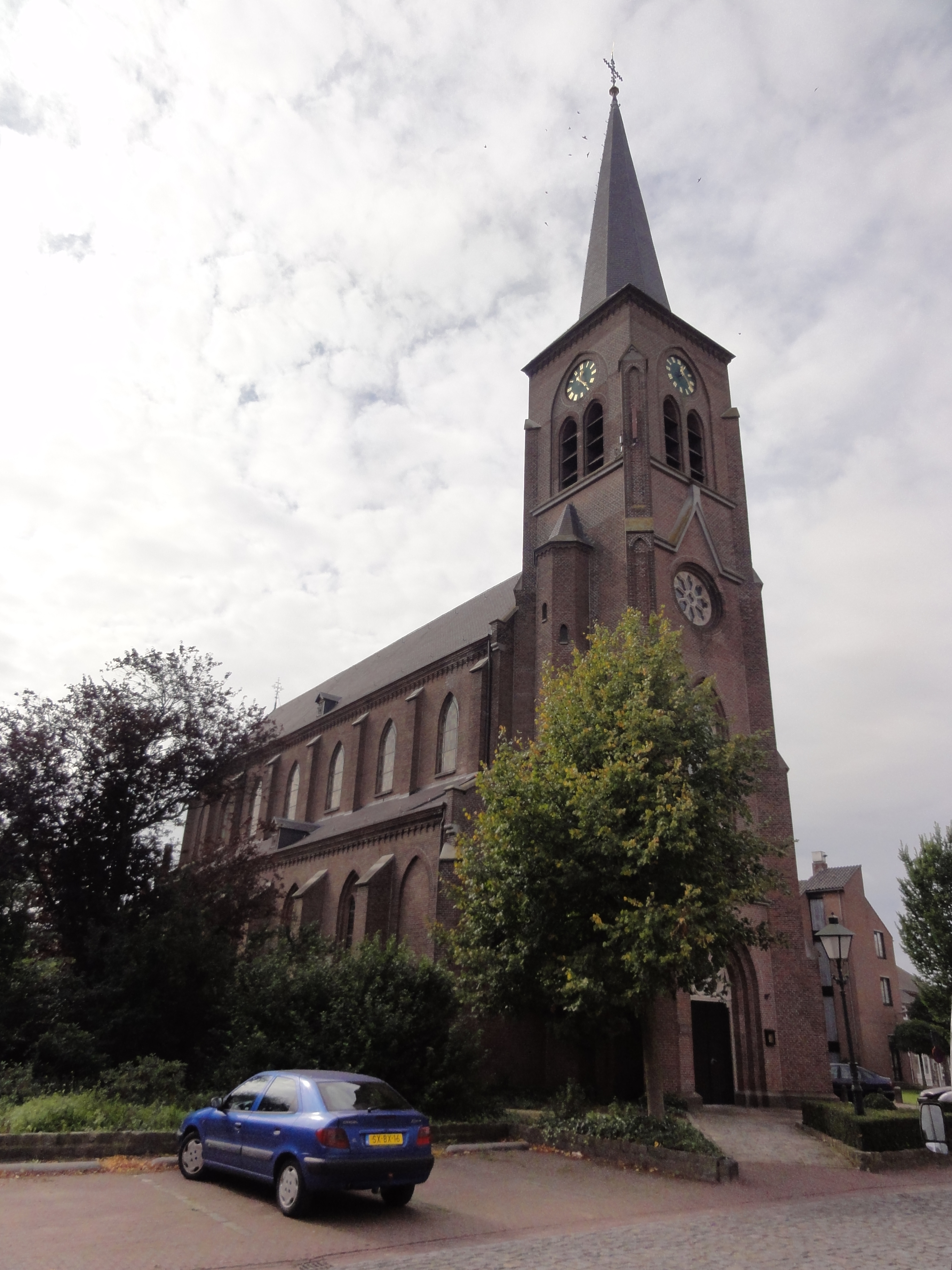
Church of St. Servatius

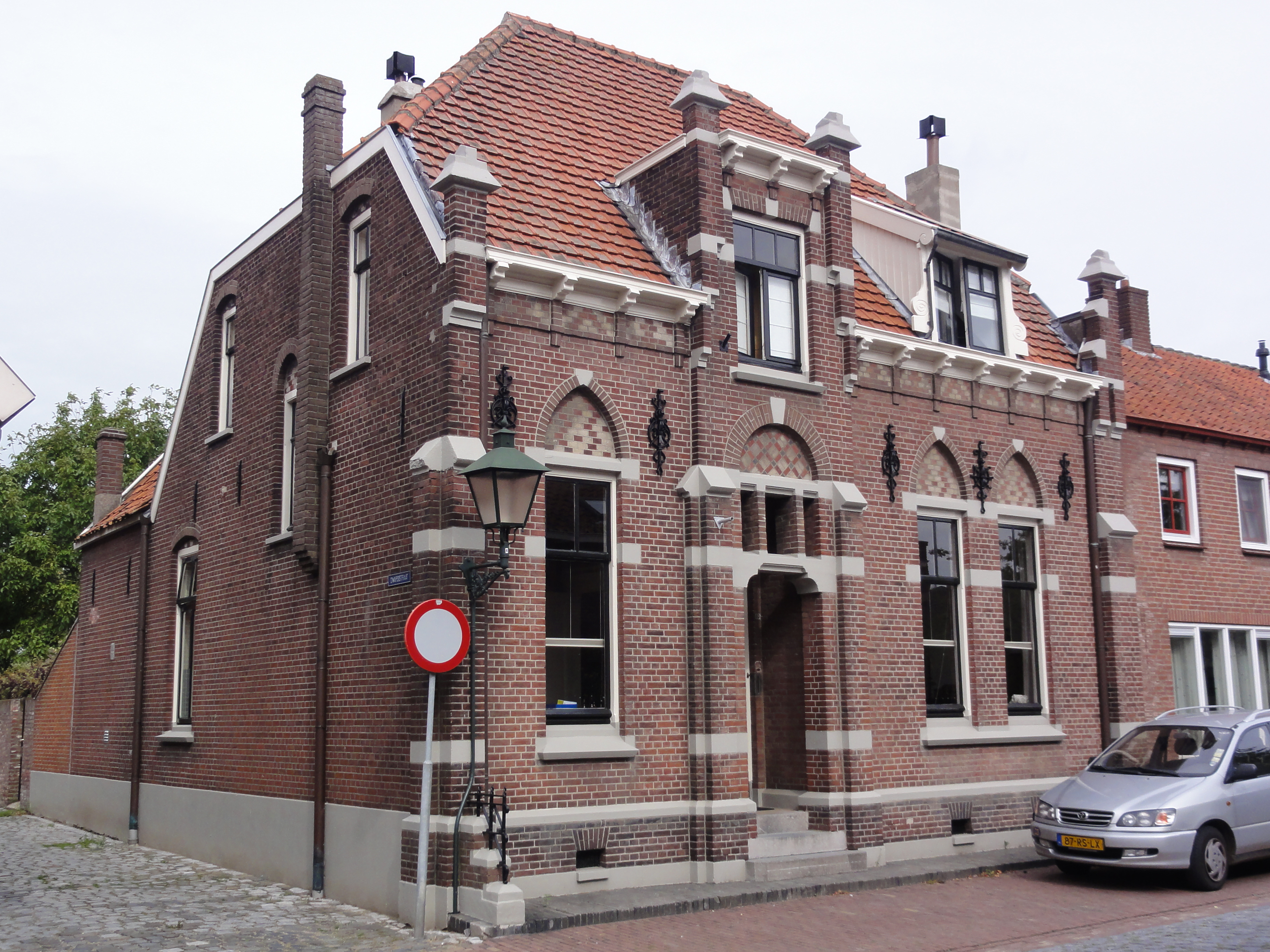
House in Megen

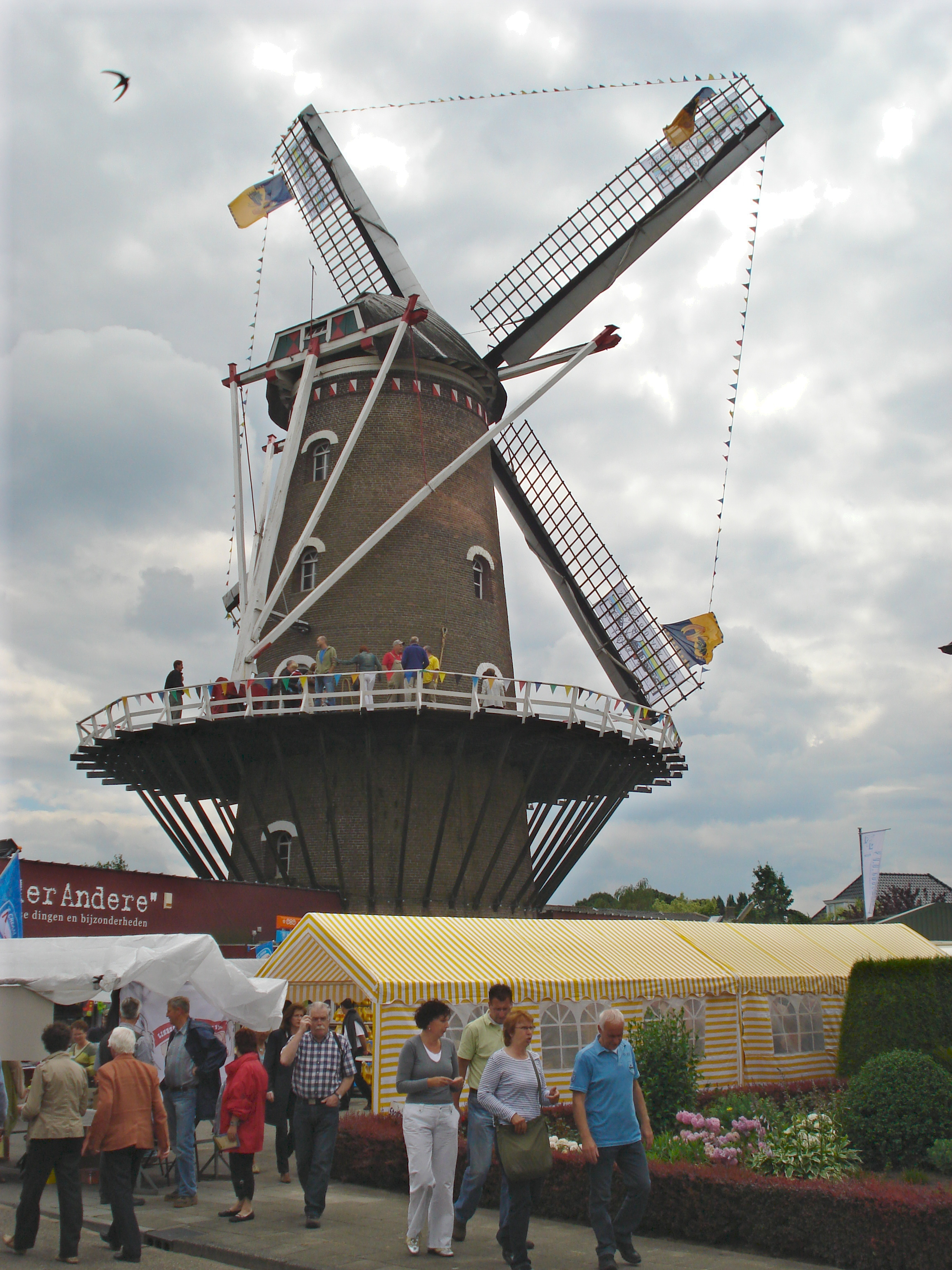
Windmill during the 650 year anniversary
