= Org 28611 =

Chemical compound

Legal status
- Legal status: CA: Schedule II; DE: NpSG (Industrial and scientific use only); UK: Under Psychoactive Substances Act

Identifiers
- IUPAC name: [1-(cyclohexylmethyl)-7-methoxyindol-3-yl]-[(3S)-3,4-dimethylpiperazin-1-yl]methanone
- CAS Number: 639068-99-8
- PubChem CID: 10091392
- ChemSpider: 8266929
- UNII: 1U7V49NTQG
- ChEMBL: ChEMBL1209709
- CompTox Dashboard (EPA): DTXSID301029650

Chemical and physical data
- Formula: C_{23}H_{33}N_{3}O_{2}
- Molar mass: 383.536 g·mol^{−1}
- 3D model (JSmol): Interactive image
- SMILES: COc3cccc(c13)c(C(=O)N(CC2C)CCN2C)cn1CC4CCCCC4
- InChI: InChI=1S/C23H33N3O2/c1-17-14-25(13-12-24(17)2)23(27)20-16-26(15-18-8-5-4-6-9-18)22-19(20)10-7-11-21(22)28-3/h7,10-11,16-18H,4-6,8-9,12-15H2,1-3H3/t17-/m0/s1; Key:ONXJNAIZJKLJGA-KRWDZBQOSA-N

Org 28611 (SCH-900,111) is a drug developed by Organon International which acts as a potent cannabinoid receptor full agonist at both the CB_{1} and CB_{2} receptors. It was developed with the aim of finding a water-soluble cannabinoid agonist suitable for intravenous use as an analgesic, and while it achieved this aim and has progressed as far as Phase II clinical trials in humans as both a sedative and an analgesic, results against the comparison drugs (midazolam and morphine respectively) were not particularly favourable in initial testing.

== See also ==
- LBP-1
- N-(S)-Fenchyl-1-(2-morpholinoethyl)-7-methoxyindole-3-carboxamide
- Org 28312
