= Berghem =

Berghem Berchem
- Town
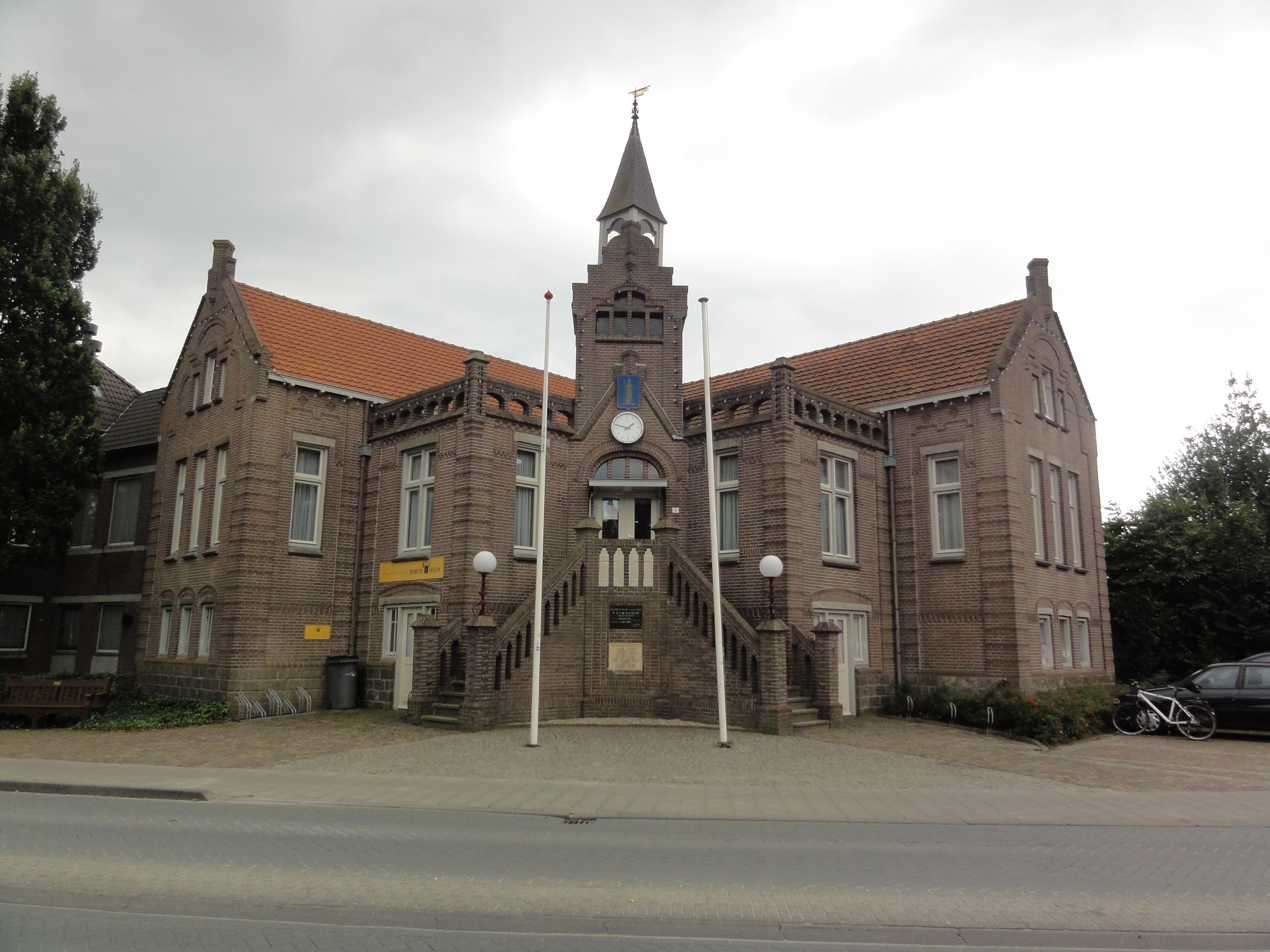
- Former town hall

- Location in the province of North Brabant in the Netherlands Berghem (Netherlands)
- Coordinates: 51°46′12″N 5°34′29″E
- Country: Netherlands
- Province: North Brabant
- Municipality: Oss

Area
  - Total: 11.26 km^{2} (4.35 sq mi)
- Elevation: 8 m (26 ft)

Population (2021)
  - Total: 10,700
  - Density: 950/km^{2} (2,460/sq mi)
- Time zone: UTC+1 (CET)
  - Summer (DST): UTC+2 (CEST)
- Postal code: 5351
- Dialing code: 0412

Berghem (older spelling: Berchem) is a town in the Dutch municipality of Oss. It is located about 4 km northeast of Oss itself.

== History ==
The village was first mentioned in 1286 as Berchem, and means "settlement on a hill".

The Catholic St Willibrordus Church has been built between 1900 and 1903 adjacent to a 15th-century tower. The medieval structure was replaced in 1858, but burnt down in 1895.

Berghem was home to 1,906 people in 1804. Until 1994, Berghem was a separate municipality, when it was merged into Oss.

== Gallery ==
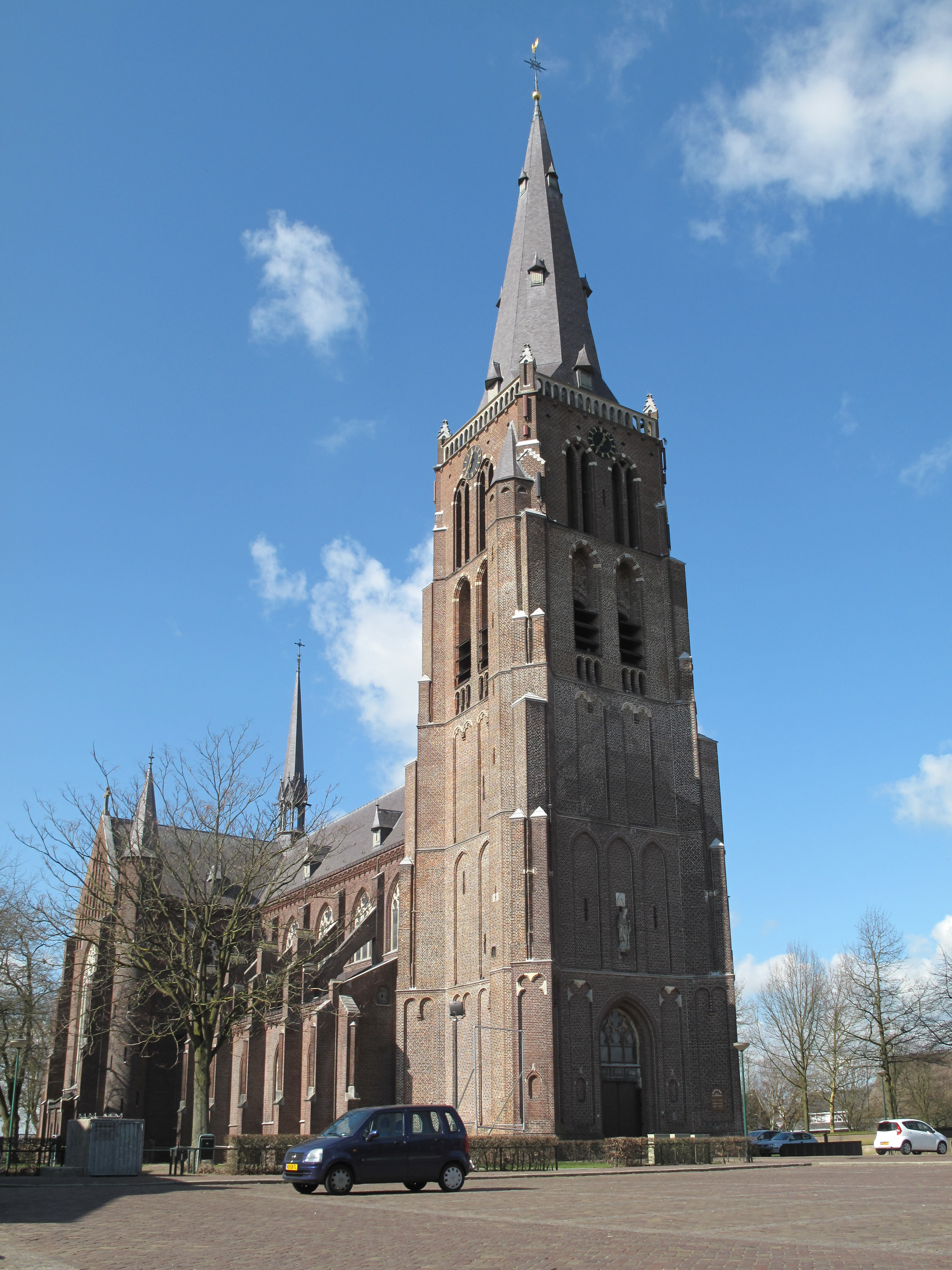
Berghem, church: Sint Willibrorduskerk

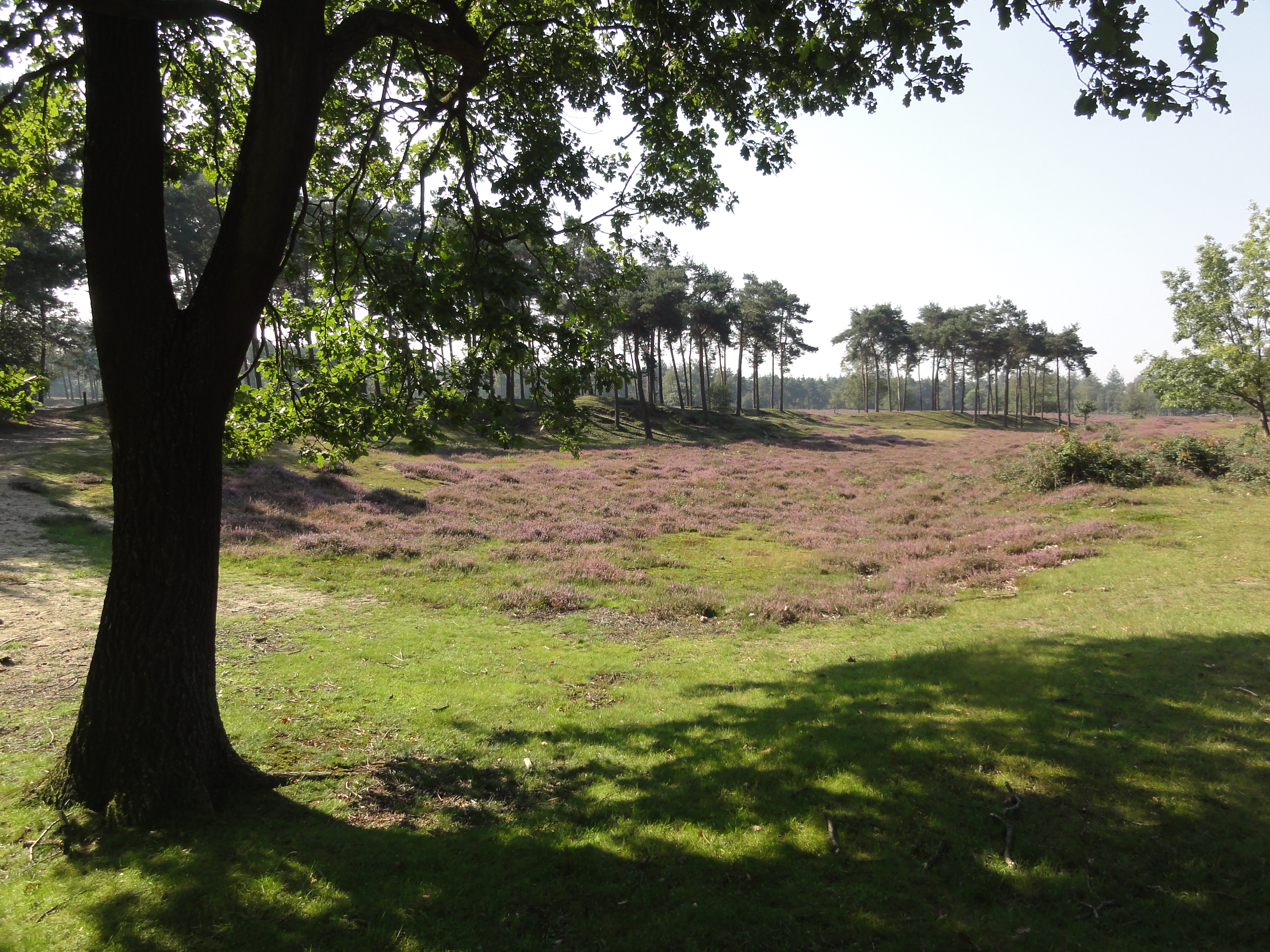
Heath Groot Ganzenven

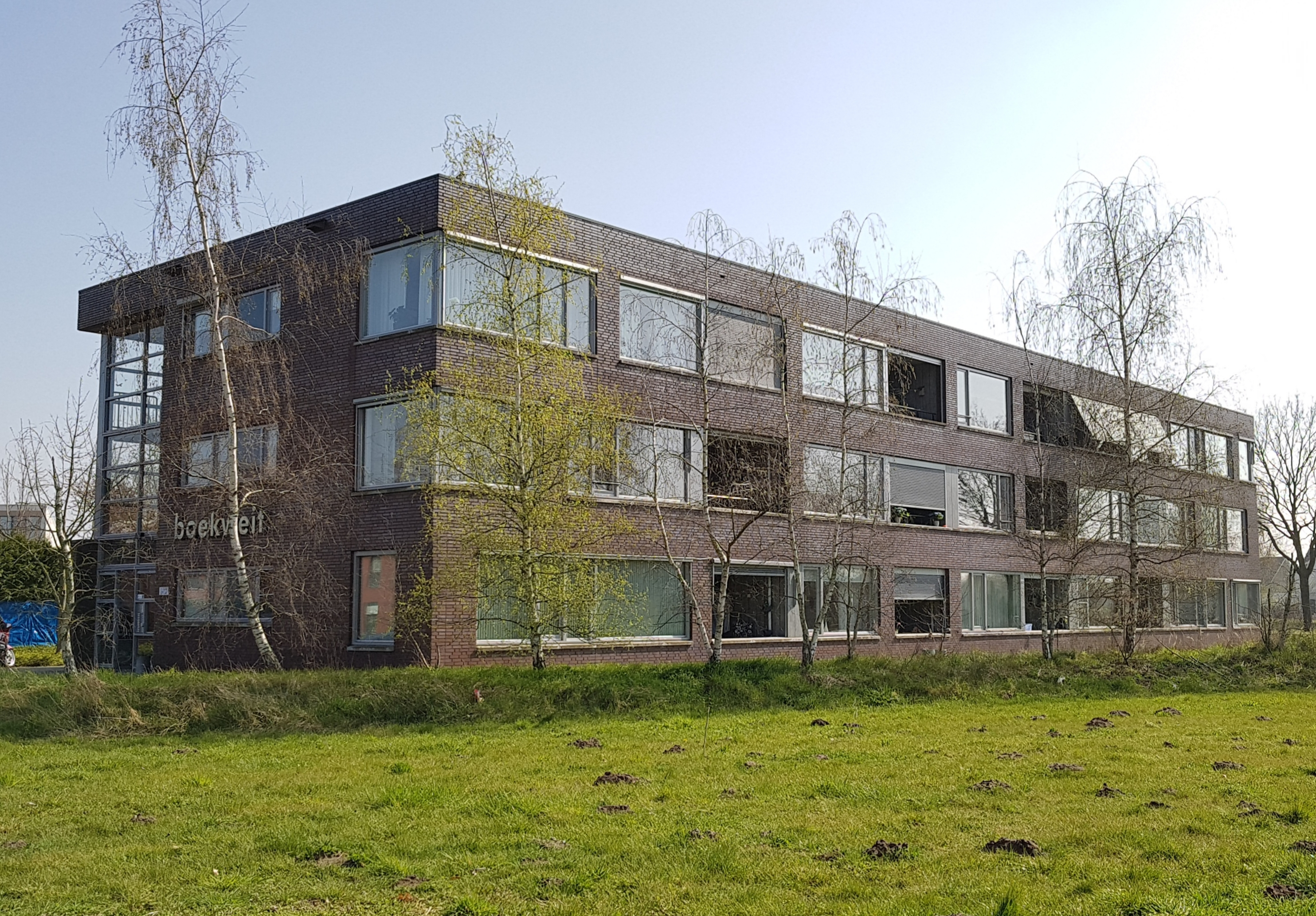
Apartment building

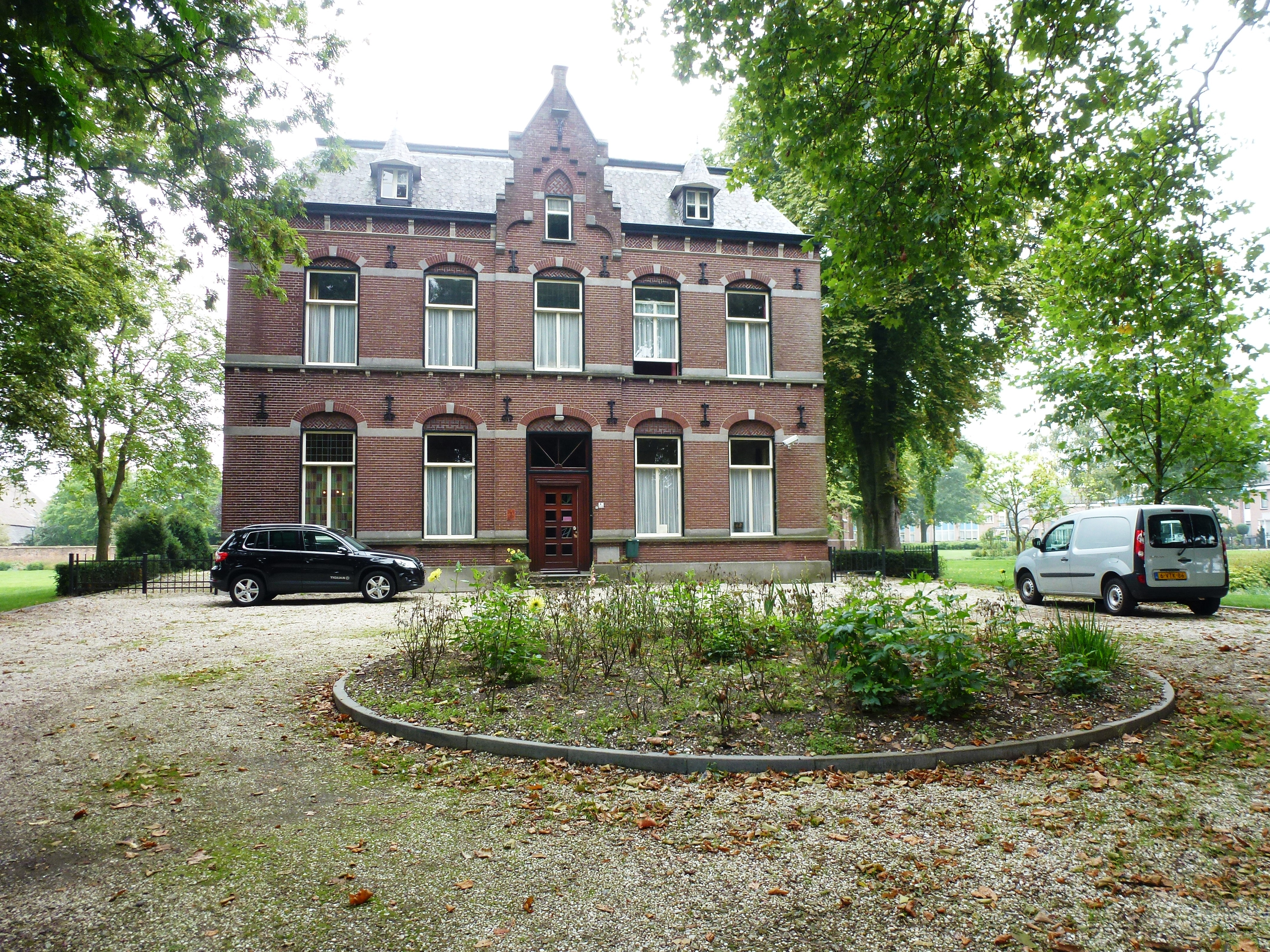
Clergy house
