= Org 28312 =

Chemical compound

Identifiers
- IUPAC name: [1-(cyclohexylmethyl)-7-methoxyindol-3-yl]-((3S,5R)-3,4,5-trimethylpiperazin-1-yl)methanone
- CAS Number: 1244028-73-6
- PubChem CID: 10069407
- ChemSpider: 24581999
- ChEMBL: ChEMBL1209708

Chemical and physical data
- Formula: C_{24}H_{35}N_{3}O_{2}
- Molar mass: 397.563 g·mol^{−1}
- 3D model (JSmol): Interactive image
- SMILES: COc2cccc1c2n(CC4CCCCC4)cc1C(=O)N(CC3C)CC(C)N3C
- InChI: InChI=1S/C24H35N3O2/c1-17-13-27(14-18(2)25(17)3)24(28)21-16-26(15-19-9-6-5-7-10-19)23-20(21)11-8-12-22(23)29-4/h8,11-12,16-19H,5-7,9-10,13-15H2,1-4H3/t17-,18+; Key:DMYGECJTVMCGEP-HDICACEKSA-N

Org 28312 is a drug developed by Organon International which acts as a potent cannabinoid receptor full agonist at both the CB_{1} and CB_{2} receptors. It was developed with the aim of finding a water-soluble cannabinoid agonist suitable for intravenous use as an analgesic, but did not proceed to human trials, with the related compound Org 28611 chosen instead due to its better penetration into the brain. The structure-activity relationships of these compounds have subsequently been investigated further leading to the development of a number of more potent analogues, derived by cyclisation around the indole or piperazine rings.

== See also ==
- LBP-1
- Org 28611
