= Oss =

- Municipality
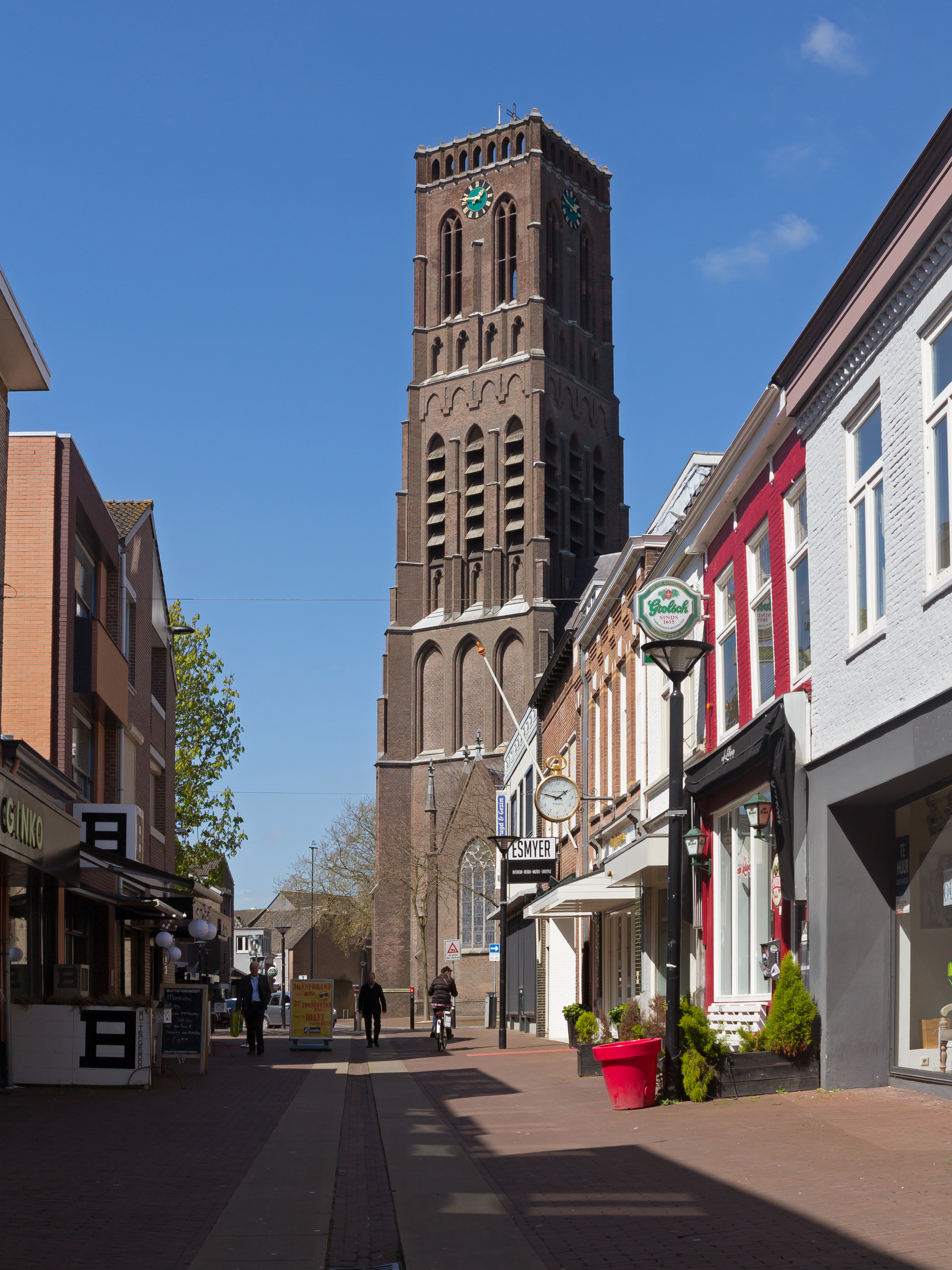
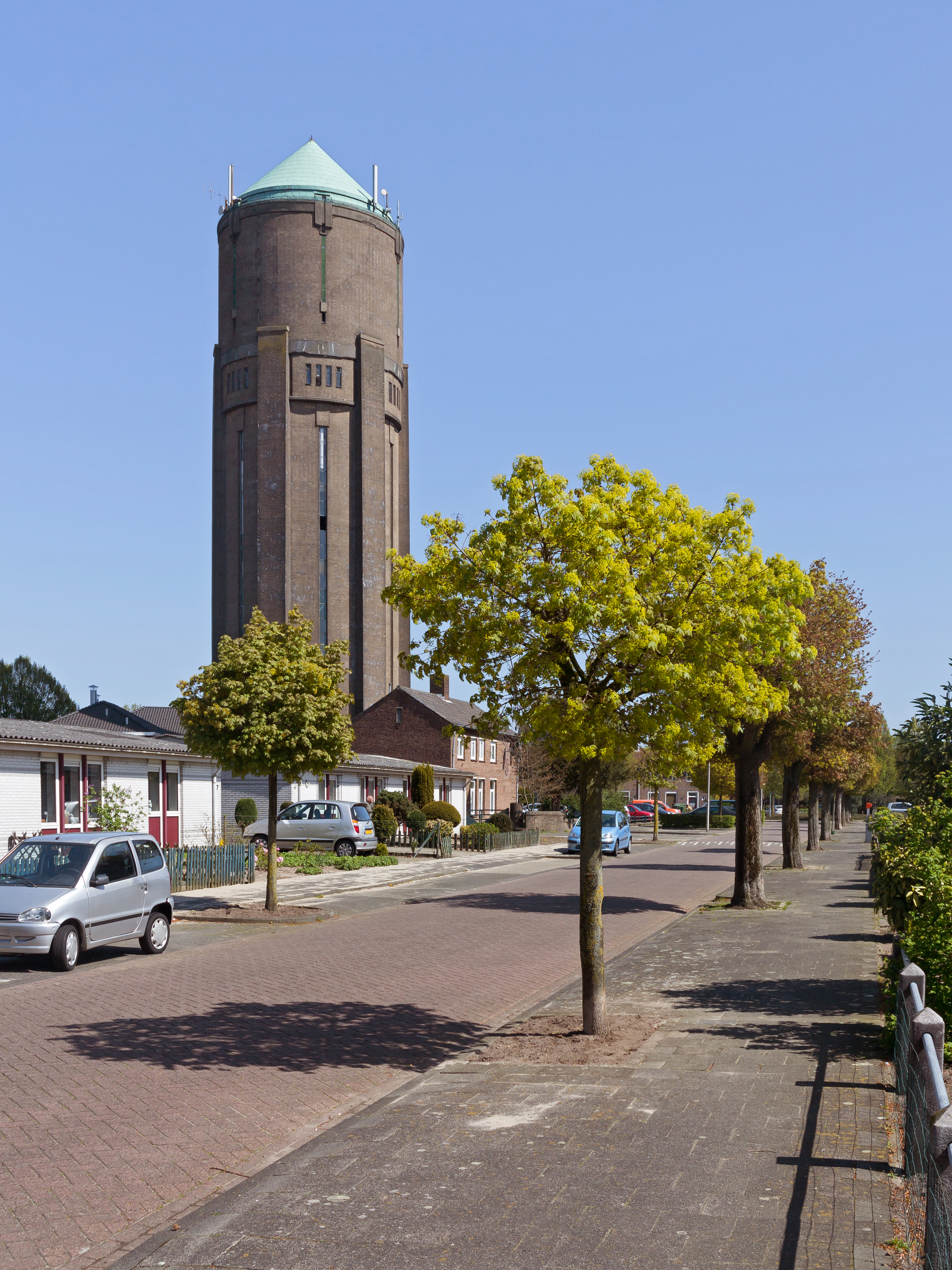
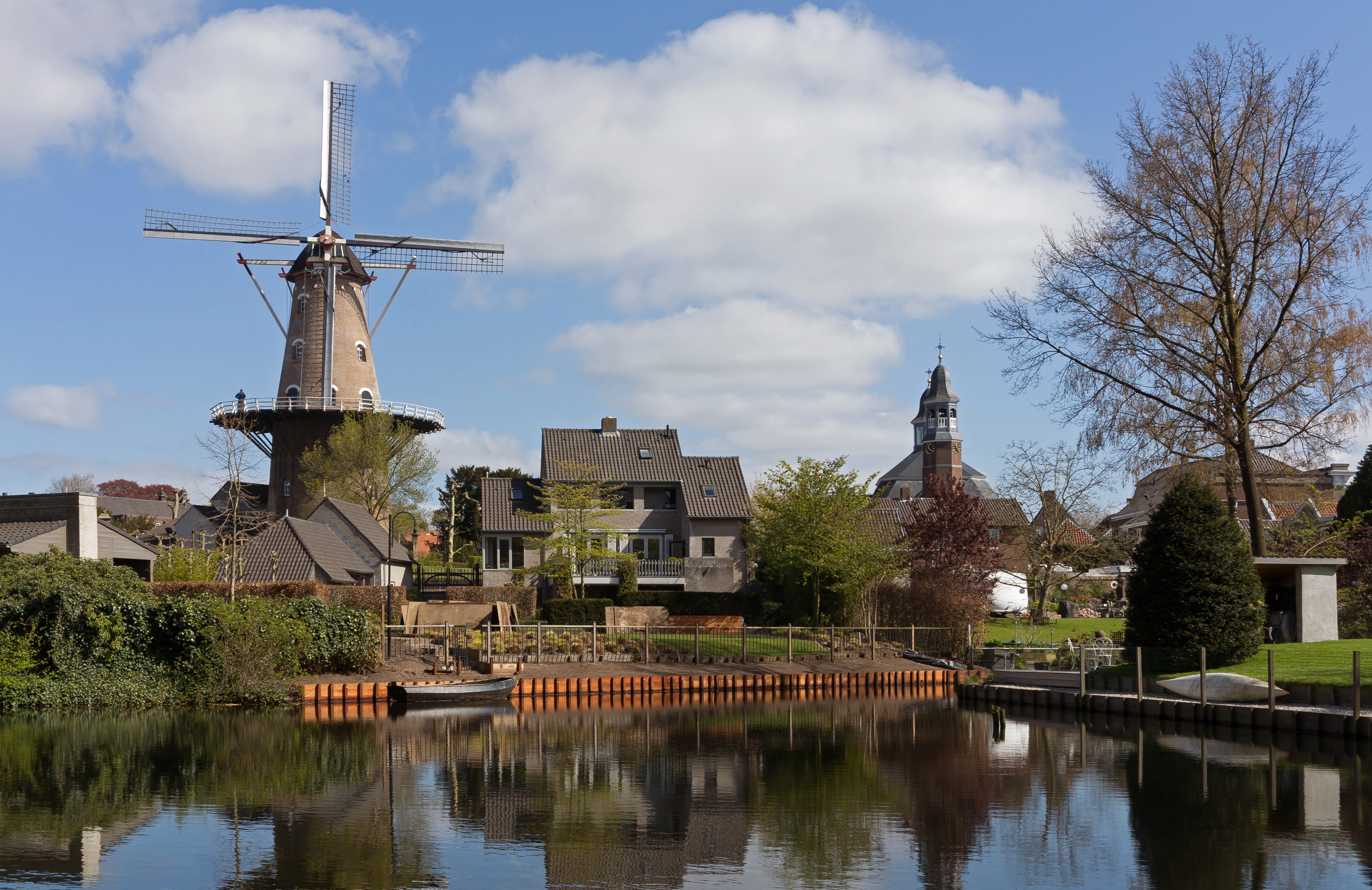
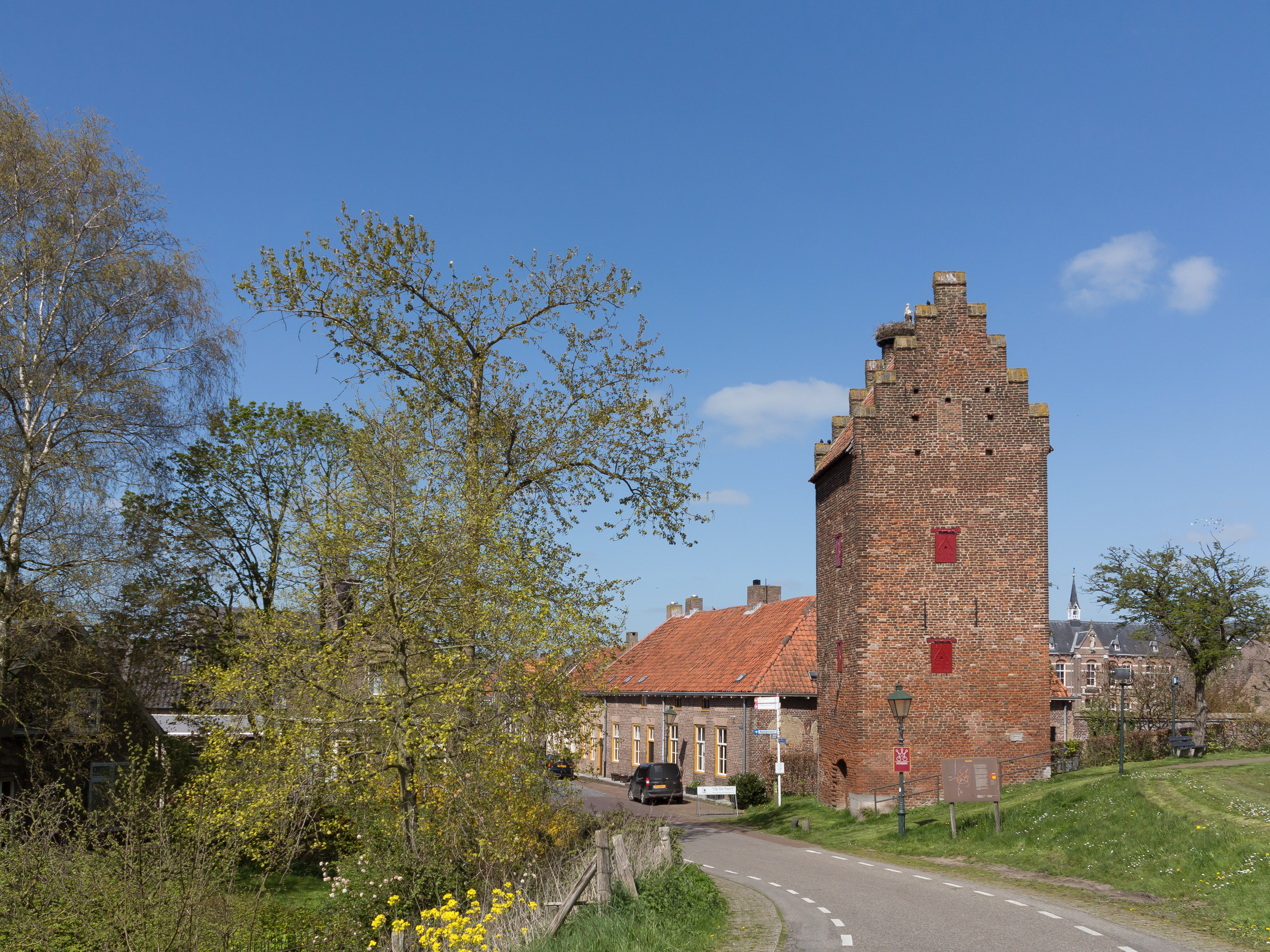
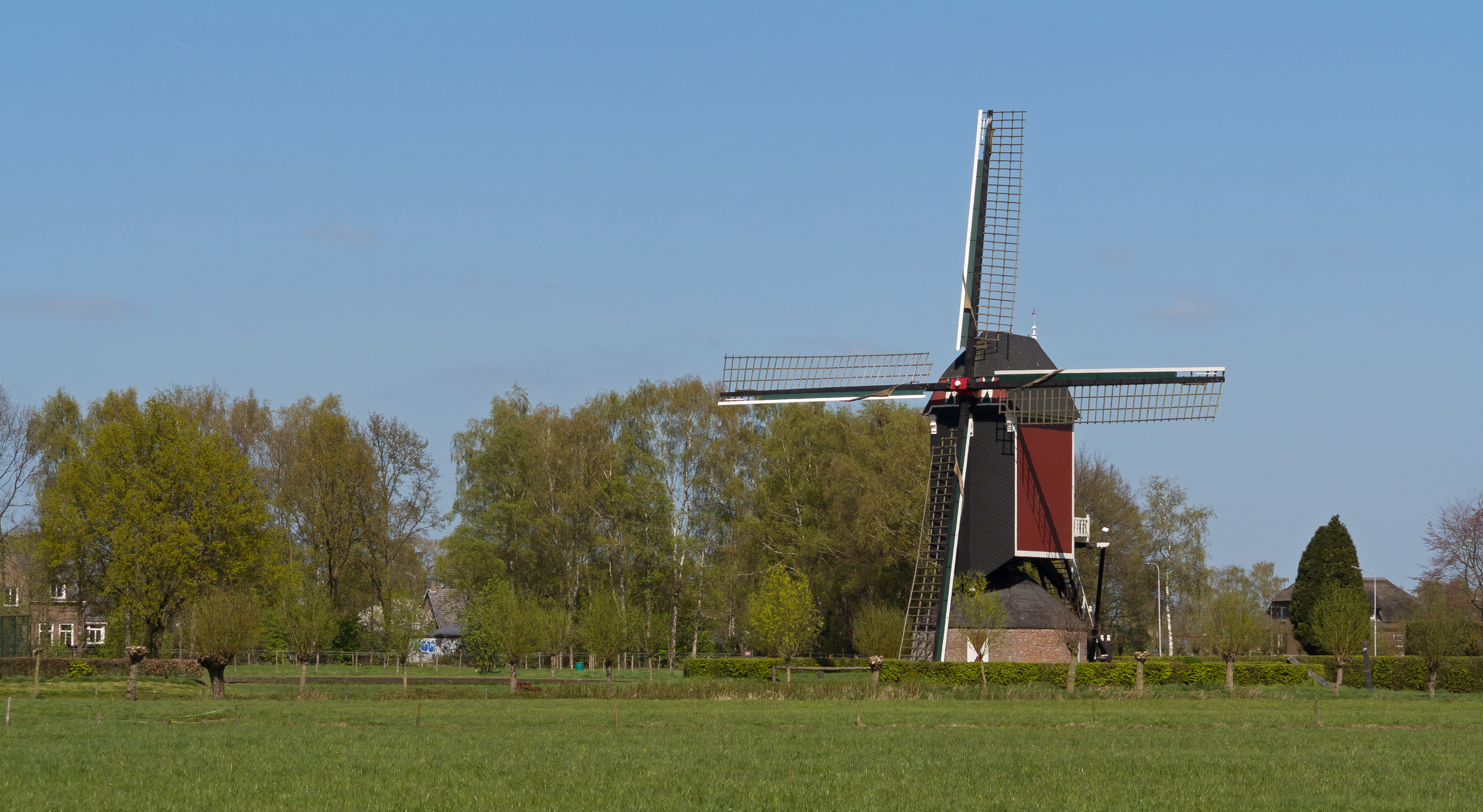
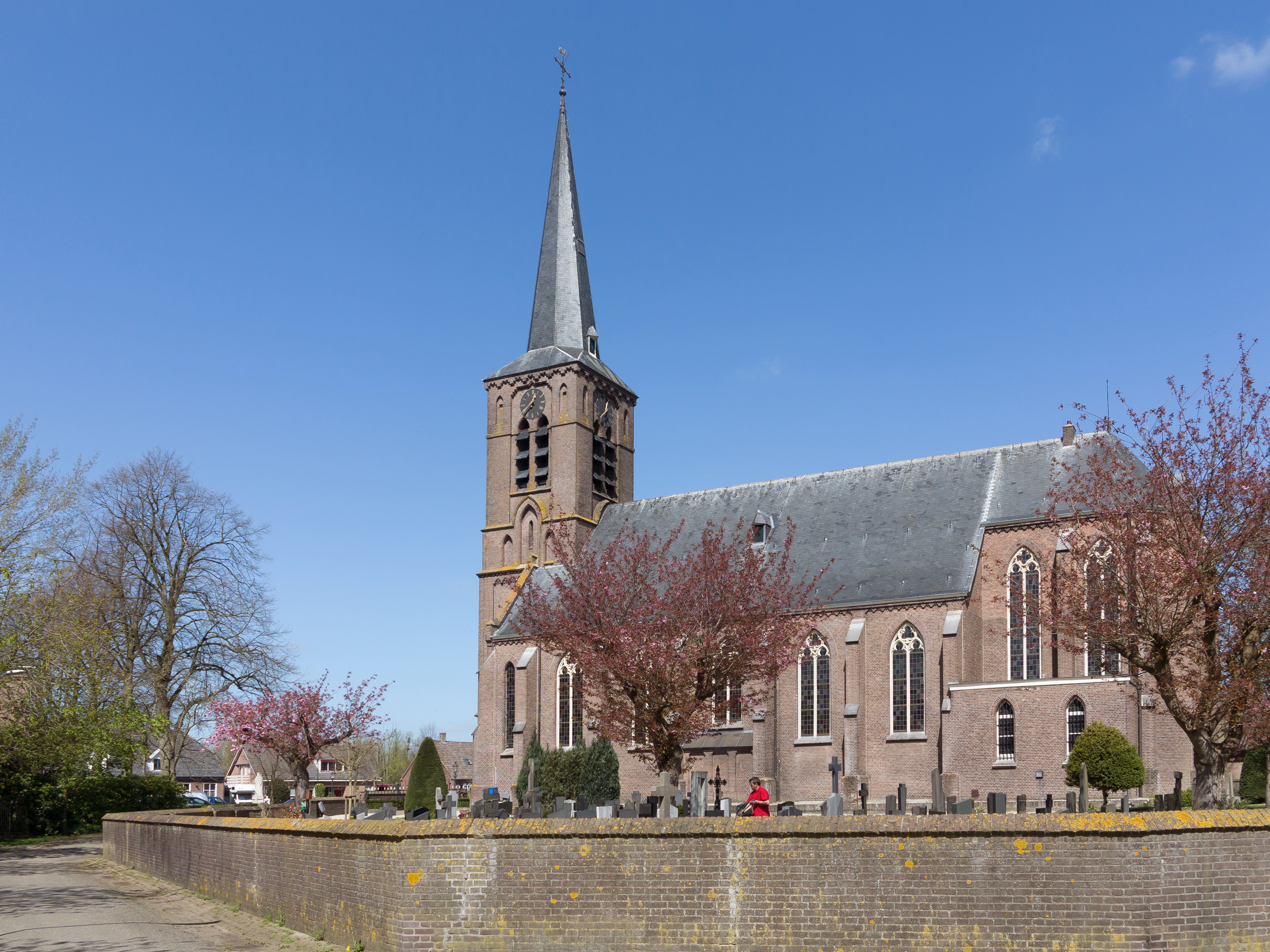
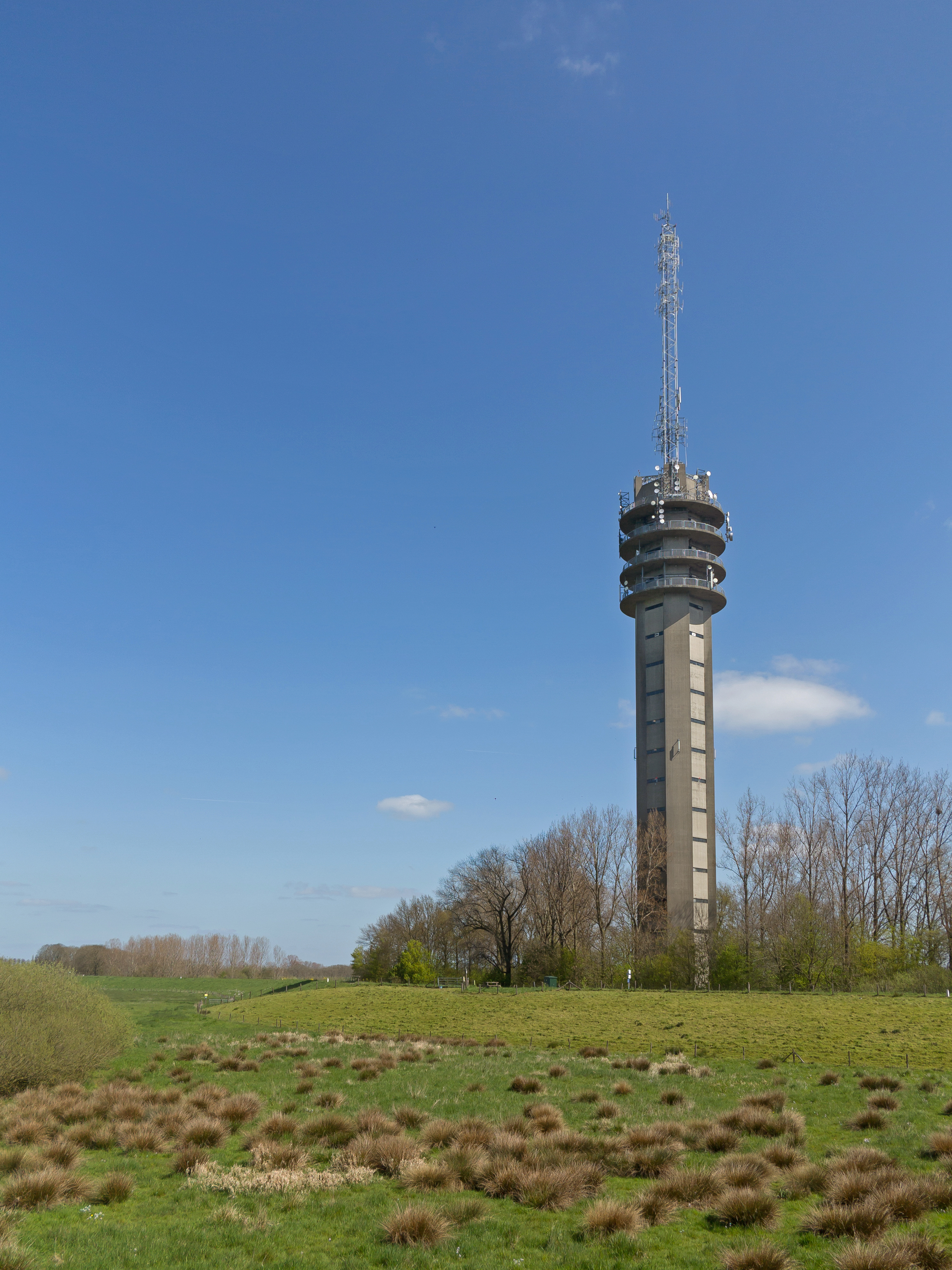
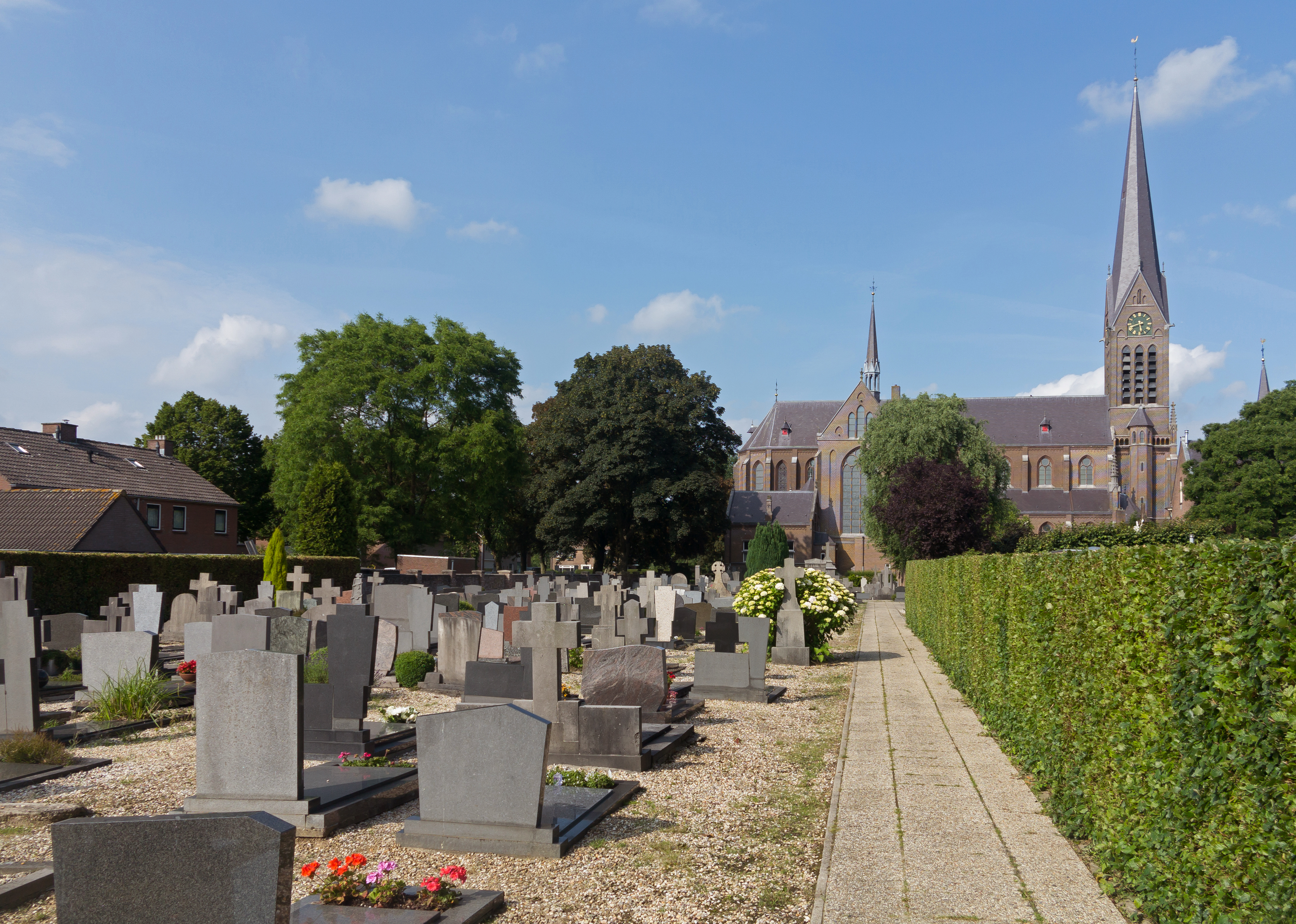
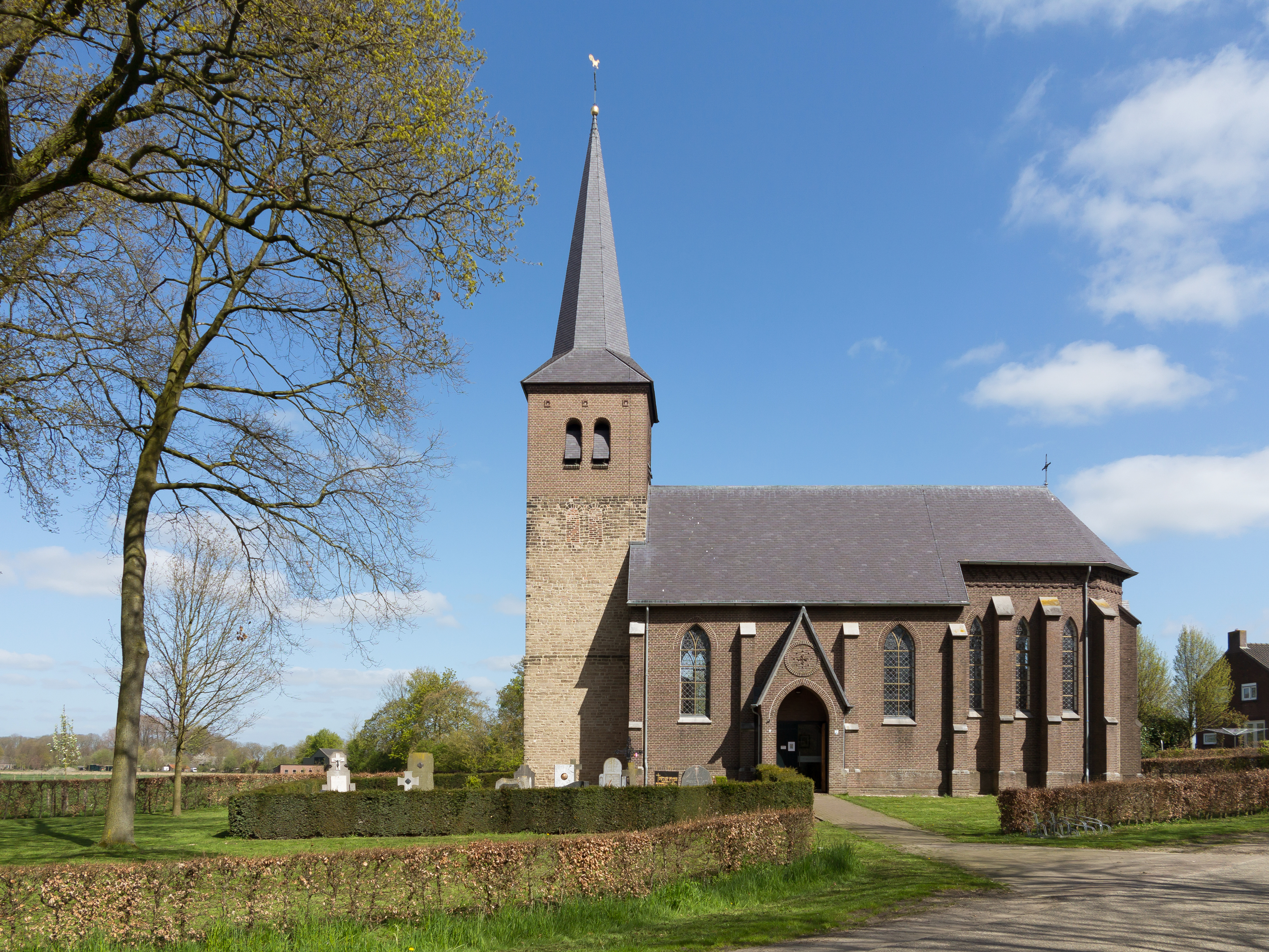
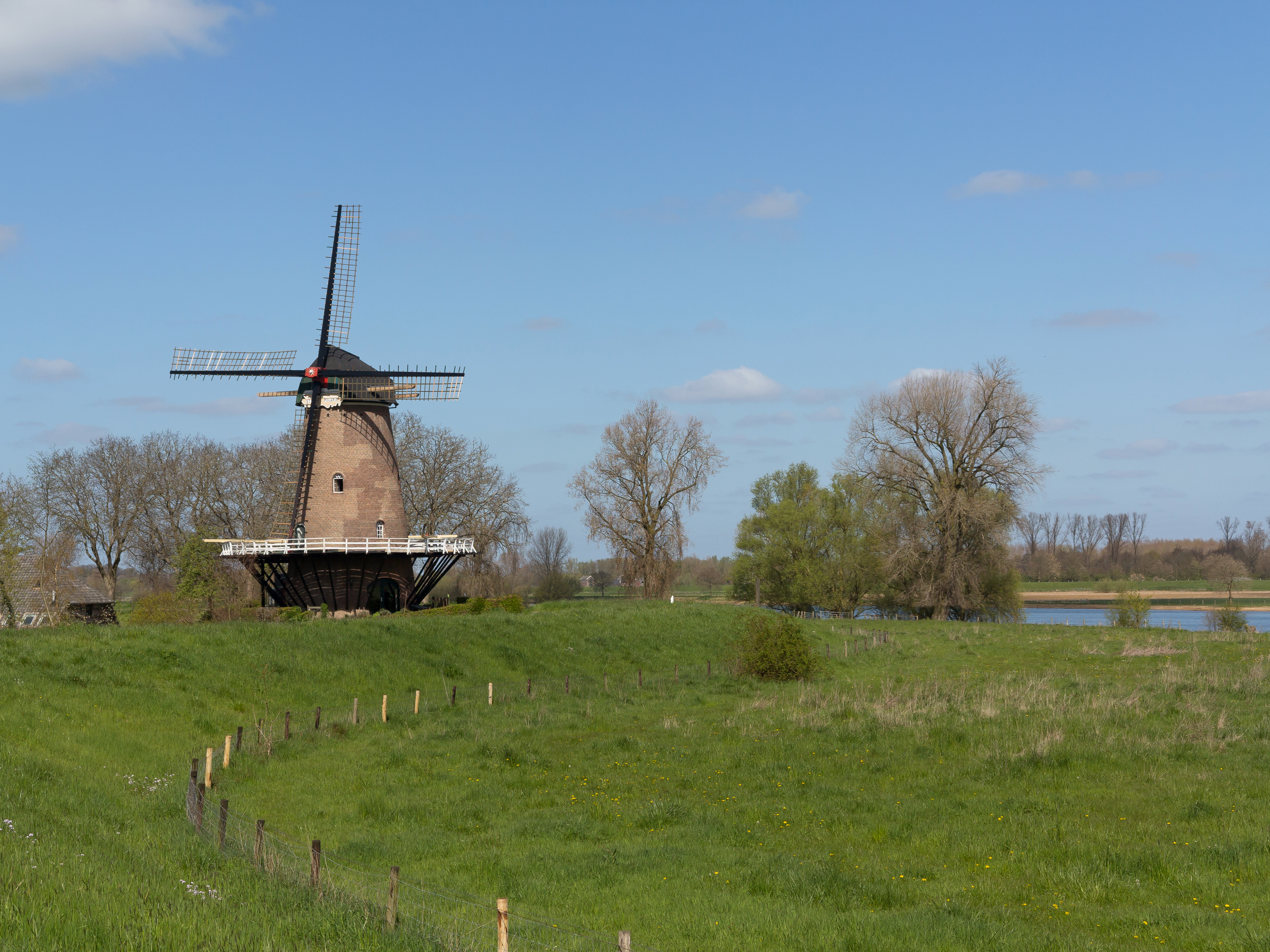
- Church of Our Lady of Immaculate Conception Water tower Nijverheid windmill in Ravenstein Town gate and prison tower (de Gevangentoren) in Megen Zeldenrust windmill in Geffen Church of Saint Lambert in Haren Alticom communication tower of Ravensteinsedijk Church of Saint Lambert in Lith Church of Sint-Jan de Doper in Neerlangel Stella Polaris windmill in Dieden

- Flag Coat of arms

- Location in North Brabant

- Location within North Brabant Location within Netherlands
- Coordinates: 51°46′N 5°31′E
- Country: Netherlands
- Province: North Brabant

Government
  - Body: Municipal council
  - Mayor: Wobine Buijs-Glaudemans (VVD)

Area
  - Total: 170.93 km^{2} (66.00 sq mi)
  - Land: 163.16 km^{2} (63.00 sq mi)
  - Water: 7.77 km^{2} (3.00 sq mi)
- Elevation: 7 m (23 ft)

Population (January 2021)
  - Total: 92,526
  - Density: 567/km^{2} (1,470/sq mi)
- Demonym: Ossenaar
- Time zone: UTC+1 (CET)
  - Summer (DST): UTC+2 (CEST)
- Postcode: 5340–5351, 5366–5373
- Area code: 0412, 0486, 073
- Website: www.oss.nl

Oss (Dutch: [ɔs]) is a municipality and a city in the southern Netherlands, in the province of North Brabant, situated between Nijmegen and 's-Hertogenbosch.

== Population centres ==
Name	Population
Berghem	10,990
Haren	722
Herpen	3,042
Lith	3,119
Macharen	737
Megen	1,720
Oss	60,772
Ravenstein	3,175

== Topography ==
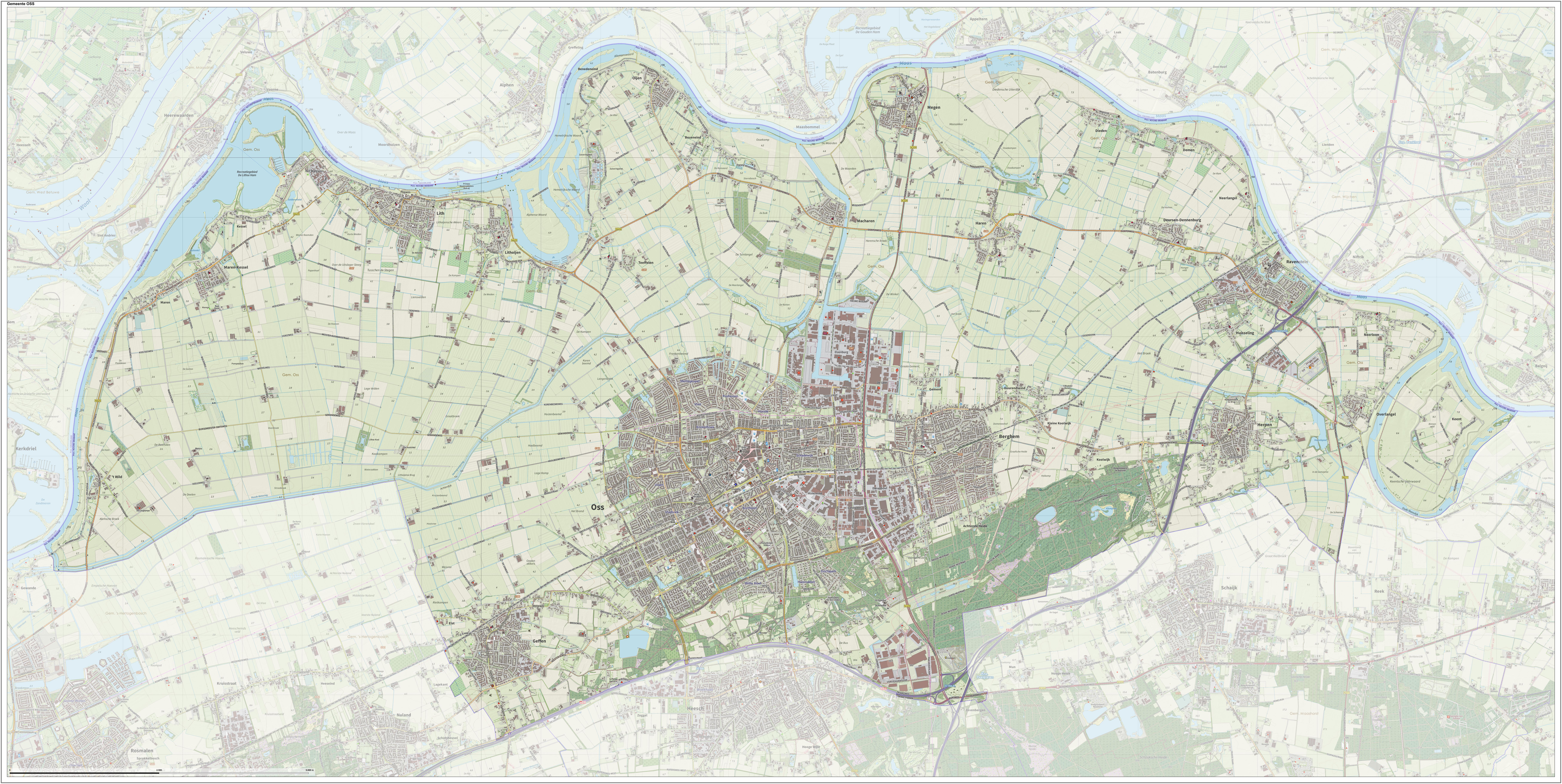

Dutch Topographic map of Oss (municipality), June 2015

== City center of Oss ==
Oss has a shopping center with many squares, however, the only real shopping streets (also the best known) are the Heuvelstraat, Walstraat and the Peperstraat. The squares are connected with these shopping streets and passages that contain shops. One of the passages (The Passage, Dutch: de Passage, Local Dialect: 't Gengske) had an overhauling renovation in 2014. It now resembles an old Dutch street.

=== The city of Oss ===
There is archaeological evidence that humans have lived in and around Oss for 4,000 years. Major archaeological finds were the Vorstengraf burial sites and the indigenous-Roman burial fields of Oss-Ussen.

Oss was first mentioned in a letter by Pope Alexander II on 6 May 1069. Oss was granted city rights in 1399 by Hertogin (Duchess) Johanna van Brabant. Present-day Oss has several chemical and pharmaceutical industries like Merck & Co. (previously Schering-Plough, Organon and Diosynth). Oss is also host to the professional football team TOP Oss, and is the birthplace of former Manchester United and Real Madrid star Ruud van Nistelrooy, although he did not play for the local side, but for rivals FC Den Bosch.

The gothic metal/alternative rock band The Gathering, formed in 1989, originally hails from Oss.

=== Berghem ===
Berghem is a small town east of Oss (population: 6,900). Berghem is currently being expanded with many new houses in the Piekenhoef.

=== Megen ===
Megen is a small city (population: 1,686) close to the river Maas.

Megen used to be the 'capital' of the county Megen (including Haren, Macharen and Teeffelen) that was founded around 1145. City rights were obtained in 1357. In 1810, the County Megen became a municipality to which Haren and Macharen also belonged. It became part of the municipality of Oss in 1994.

Currently, there are two monasteries in Megen. One is inhabited by the Clarissas (also called the Poor Clares), followers of St. Clare of Assisi. The other is occupied by the Franciscans, followers of St. Francis of Assisi. Of the two castles Megen used to have, only one tower remains.

=== Ravenstein ===
Ravenstein (population: 3,728) is a city and was a municipality until 2003, when it was added to the Oss municipality. The municipality covered an area of 42.68 km² and also included villages: Demen, Dennenburg, Deursen, Dieden, Herpen, Huisseling, Keent, Koolwijk, Neerlangel, Neerloon, Overlangel.

Ravenstein received city rights in 1380.

== Transportation ==
- Railway stations: Oss, Oss West, Ravenstein

== Notable residents ==
=== The arts ===
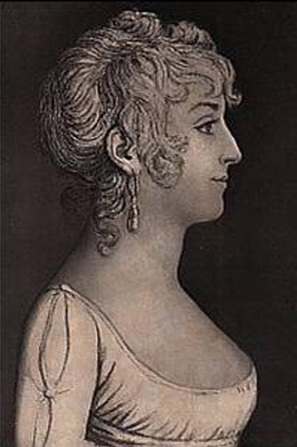
Maria Versfelt, ca.1820

- John Slotanus (died 1560) a Dutch Roman Catholic polemical writer, born in Geffen.
- Walter Pompe (1703 in Lith – 1777) a Flemish master-sculptor of religious works in wood
- Maria Versfelt (1776–1845) a Dutch writer and stage actress, known for her adventurous life
- Joop Falke (1933-2016) a Dutch artist, goldsmith and sculptor
- Pieter Nooten (born 1961), musician and composer best known for his work with Clan of Xymox
- Joep van Lieshout (born 1963 in Ravenstein) a Dutch artist and sculptor
- C. C. Catch (born 1964), pop singer
- Michel van der Aa (born 1970) a Dutch composer of contemporary classical music
- Frank Boeijen (born 1973) songwriter and keyboardist with Dutch metal band The Gathering
- Niels Duffhuës (born 1973) a Dutch multi-instrumentalist, composer and writer
- Chris Berens (born 1976) a Dutch painter, in the realms of surrealism and visionary art
- Marjolein Kooijman (born 1980) former bass player with Dutch metal band The Gathering

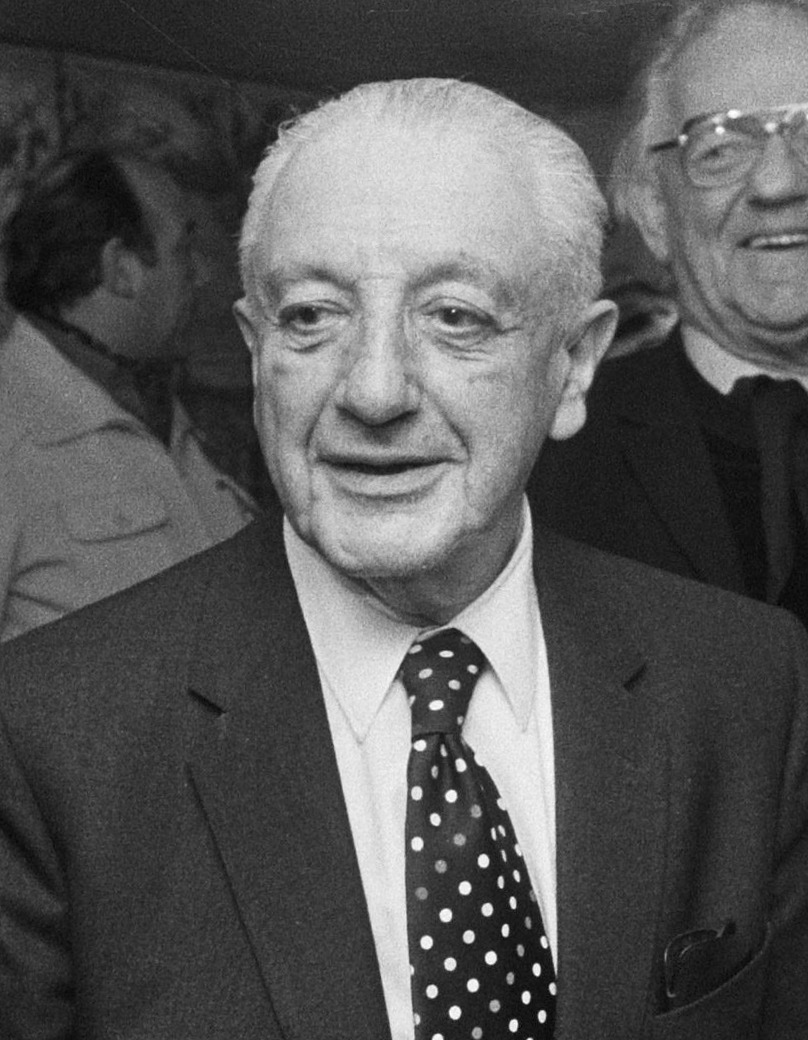
Jacques de Kadt, 1980

=== Public thinking & public service ===
- Antoon Jurgens (1805-1880), Dutch merchant and industrialist; he founded a butter company
- Samuel van den Bergh (1864-1941), European margarine and soap manufacturer
- Saal van Zwanenberg (1889-1974), founder of pharmaceutical company Organon & Co.
- Jacques de Kadt (1897-1988), political thinker, politician and writer
- Jan Marijnissen (born 1952), Dutch politician, belongs to the Socialist Party
- Lambert van Nistelrooij (born 1953), Dutch politician and MEP, 2004 to 2019

=== Sport ===
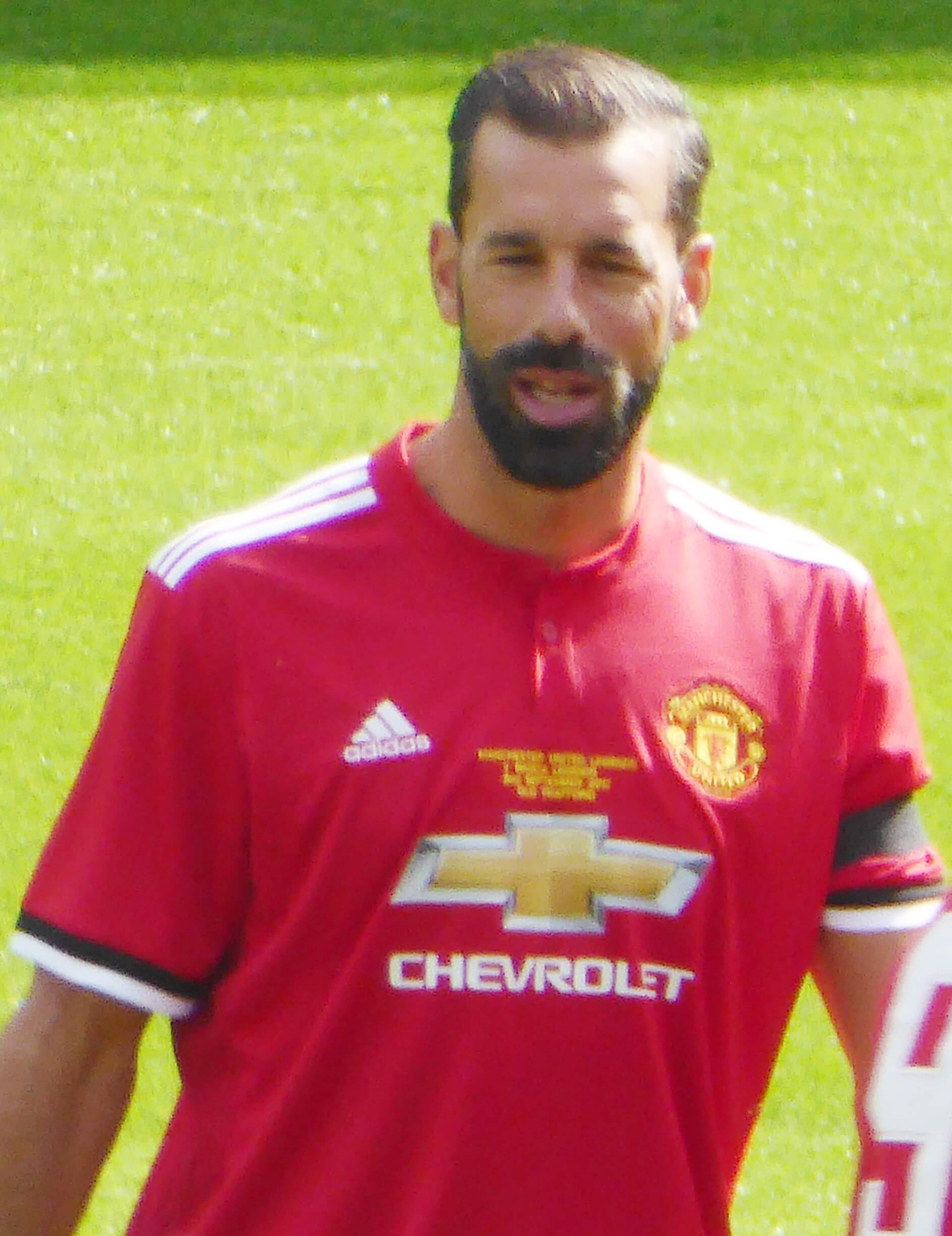
Ruud van Nistelrooy, 2017

- Cor Euser (born 1957) a Dutch racing driver
- Marc van Hintum (born 1967) a Dutch former footballer with over 400 club caps
- John van den Berk (born 1967) a Dutch former two-time motocross world champion
- Marc Lammers (born 1969), field hockey player and coach
- brothers Bas (born 1971) and Mike van de Goor (born 1973) volleyball players, team gold medallists at the 1996 Summer Olympics
- Bart Griemink (born 1972) a Dutch former professional football goalkeeper
- Ruud van Nistelrooy (born 1976) a Dutch retired footballer with 449 club caps and 70 caps with the Netherlands national football team
- Albert Kraus (born 1980) a Dutch welterweight kickboxer, K-1 World MAX Champion, 2002
- Bas Verwijlen (born 1983) a fencer, competed at the 2012 Summer Olympics
- Loek van Mil (1984-2019) a Dutch professional baseball pitcher
- Rens van Eijden (born 1988) a Dutch footballer with over 250 club caps
- Gino Vos (born 1990) a Dutch professional darts player
- Rick van der Ven (born 1991) a Dutch archer, competed in Archery at the 2012 Summer Olympics
- Richard van der Venne (born 1992) a Dutch professional footballer
- Cihat Çelik (born 1996) a Dutch professional footballer
- Mitchell van Bergen (born 1999) a Dutch professional footballer

== See also ==
- Haren en Macharen
