= Organon & Co. =

American pharmaceutical company

- Type: Public
- Traded as: NYSE: OGN; S&P 600 component
- Industry: Pharmaceuticals
- Predecessor: Organon International
- Founded: 1923; 103 years ago (as Organon International); 2020; 6 years ago (as spinoff from Merck & Co.); 2026; 0 years ago (Sun Pharma bought for US$ 11.75 Billion)
- Headquarters: 30 Hudson Street, Jersey City, New Jersey, U.S.
- Key people: Joseph Morrissey (CEO)
- Revenue: ▼US$6.22 billion (2025)
- Net income: ▼US$187 million (2025)
- Number of employees: c. 10,000 (2024)
- Parent: Sun Pharma
- Website: organon.com

Organon & Co. is an American pharmaceutical company originally founded in Oss, The Netherlands and now headquartered in Jersey City, New Jersey. Organon specializes in the following core therapeutic fields: reproductive medicine, contraception, psychiatry, hormone replacement therapy (HRT), and anesthesia. Organon produces all its products outside of the United States but receives a third of its revenue from the United States.

== History ==
Organon was founded in 1923 as a partnership between Professor Ernst Laqueur, a physiologist/endocrinologist of the University of Amsterdam, and Saal van Zwanenberg who owned a slaughterhouse, Zwanenbergs Slachterije en Fabrieken, in Oss in Northern Brabant. The company's first product was insulin in 1923. In the 1930s it manufactured estrogens, in particular estrone under the trade name Menformon.

In 1948, Organon acquired the Newhouse research site in Scotland, United Kingdom. The production of cortisone was initiated in 1953.

In 1962, the company bought the stock of the Nederlandsche Cocaïnefabriek, and the company name was changed to Koninklijke Zwanenberg-Organon (KZO). It merged with the fibre producer AKU in 1969 to become AKZO, later Akzo Nobel. Organon was the human health care business unit of Akzo Nobel. In 2004, Organon acquired active-pharmaceutical-ingredient producer Diosynth.

Organon was initially located in West Orange, New Jersey. In November 2007, Schering-Plough acquired Organon BioSciences and the veterinary pharmaceutical company Intervet from Akzo Nobel. Schering-Plough transferred Organon to its headquarters in Jersey City, New Jersey. Two years later, Schering-Plough merged with Merck & Co., known as Merck Sharp & Dohme or MSD outside the United States and Canada.

In May 2020, Merck & Co. announced that Organon & Co. would be the name of "the pending spin-off of its women’s health, legacy products, and biosimilars businesses, which the company says is on track to be completed by the end of the first half in 2021." Merck completed the spinoff and Organon & Co. became a publicly traded company on June 3, 2021. A copy of the Information Statement sent to Merck shareholders was filed with the U.S. SEC on April 20, 2021, in a Form 10-12B/A, Exhibit 99.1

In November 2021, the business announced it would acquire Forendo Pharma and its lead compound, a potentially first-in-class oral 17β-hydroxysteroid dehydrogenase type 1 inhibitor.

In April 2026, India based Sun Pharma acquired Organon & Co. at $11.75 billion.

== Products ==
Organon's products are divided into three main categories: women's health (27% of revenue), biosimilars (8% of revenue), and established brands (64% of revenue). Women's health products are mainly contraceptives such as Nexplanon, a five-year reversible contraceptive implant, and fertility drugs such as Puregon, a follicle-stimulating hormone drug.

Biosimilars provide treatment for oncology and immunology at potentially lower cost than other FDA approved treatments. Organon makes the biosimilar Hadlima which it compares to Humira. Their established brands are heavily reliant on sales outside the United States of drugs with generic competition. The cardiovascular products such as Vytorin make a combined 24% of the company revenue.(Revenue figures are from 2022.)

== Research compounds ==
During its period of independent operation, Organon developed a large number of compounds which were never adopted for medical use, but continue to be used for a variety of scientific research. Notable compounds include:

- Org 12962
- Org 20599
- Org 21465
- Org 25435
- Org 25935
- Org 26576
- Org 27569
- Org 28312
- Org 28611
- Org 37684

== Medicaid fraud ==
In 2007, whistleblower lawsuits were filed against Organon in federal courts in Massachusetts and Texas. Organon was accused of selling its anti-depression medication Remeron at a discount to nursing home pharmacies in order to encourage use, yet filing claims to Medicaid for reimbursement at the full, undiscounted price. Organon agreed to settle the case for $31 million in October 2014.
