= ORG-25435 =

Chemical compound

Identifiers
- IUPAC name: (2,6-dimethoxy-4-methylphenyl)-(2R)-2-[bis(2-methoxyethyl)amino]butanoate
- CAS Number: 256456-73-2
- PubChem CID: 9885653
- UNII: VCW1NHW3OV
- CompTox Dashboard (EPA): DTXSID401029772

Chemical and physical data
- Formula: C_{19}H_{31}NO_{6}
- Molar mass: 369.458 g·mol^{−1}
- 3D model (JSmol): Interactive image
- SMILES: COc1cc(C)cc(OC)c1OC(=O)C(CC)N(CCOC)CCOC

ORG-25435 is a synthetic drug developed by Organon International, which acts as a GABA_{A} receptor positive allosteric modulator, and produces sedative effects. It has been researched for use as an intravenous anesthetic agent, with positive results in initial trials, although negative side effects like hypotension and tachycardia, as well as unpredictable pharmacokinetics at higher doses, have meant it has ultimately not been adopted for medical use.
