= Macharen =

- Village
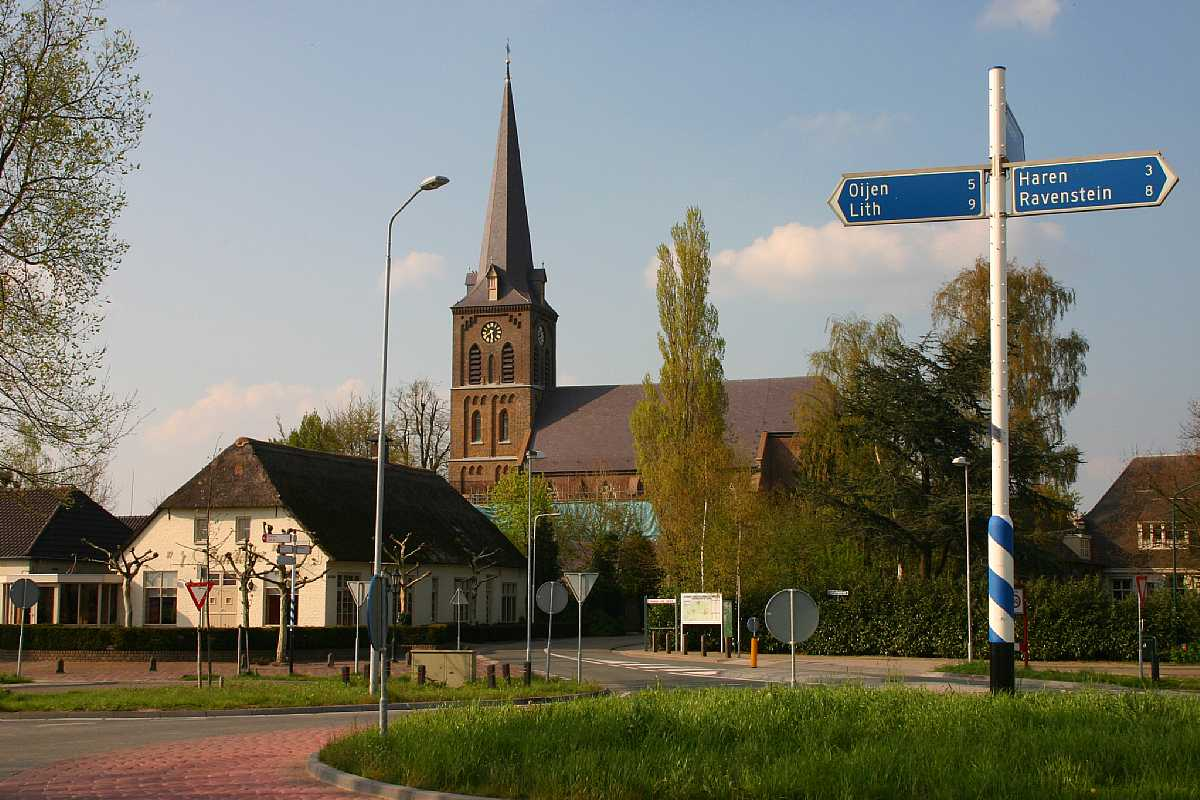

- Location in the province of North Brabant in the Netherlands Macharen (Netherlands)
- Coordinates: 51°48′18″N 5°32′39″E
- Country: Netherlands
- Province: North Brabant
- Municipality: Oss

Area
  - Total: 0.86 km^{2} (0.33 sq mi)
- Elevation: 8 m (26 ft)

Population (2021)
  - Total: 655
  - Density: 760/km^{2} (2,000/sq mi)
- Time zone: UTC+1 (CET)
  - Summer (DST): UTC+2 (CEST)
- Postal code: 5367
- Dialing code: 0412

Macharen is a village in the southern part of the Netherlands, in the province North Brabant. It is part of the Oss municipality.

The village was first mentioned in 1107 as Machera, and means "suitable sandy ridge".

The Catholic St Petrus Bandenkerk was built between 1862 and 1867, however the tower dates from the 15th century.

Macharen was home to 389 people in 1840. Macharen originally was a part of the county Megen, which was founded around 1145. In 1810, it became municipality together with Megen and Haren. It became a part of the municipality Oss in 1994.

== Gallery ==
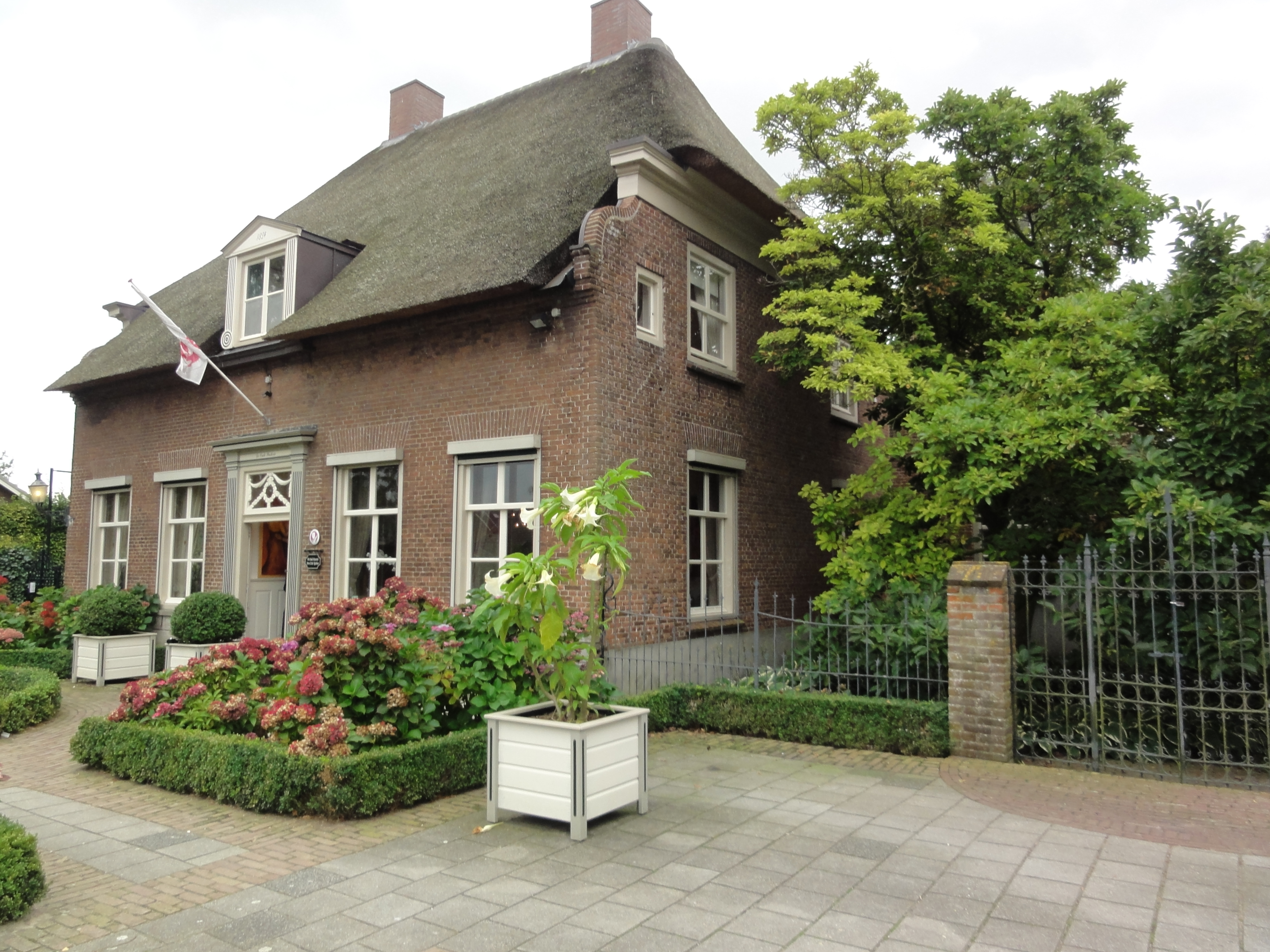
Clergy house

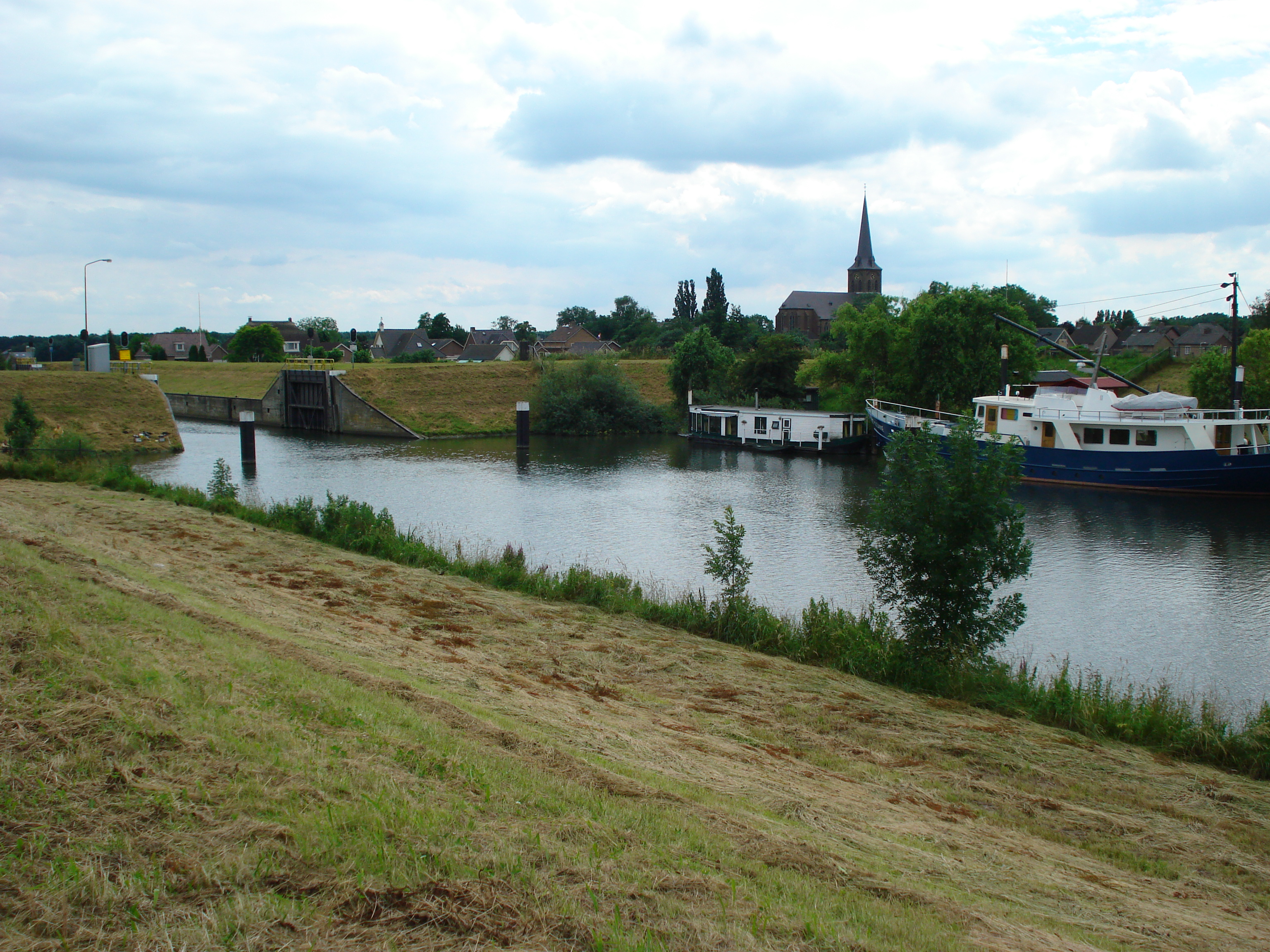
View on Macharen

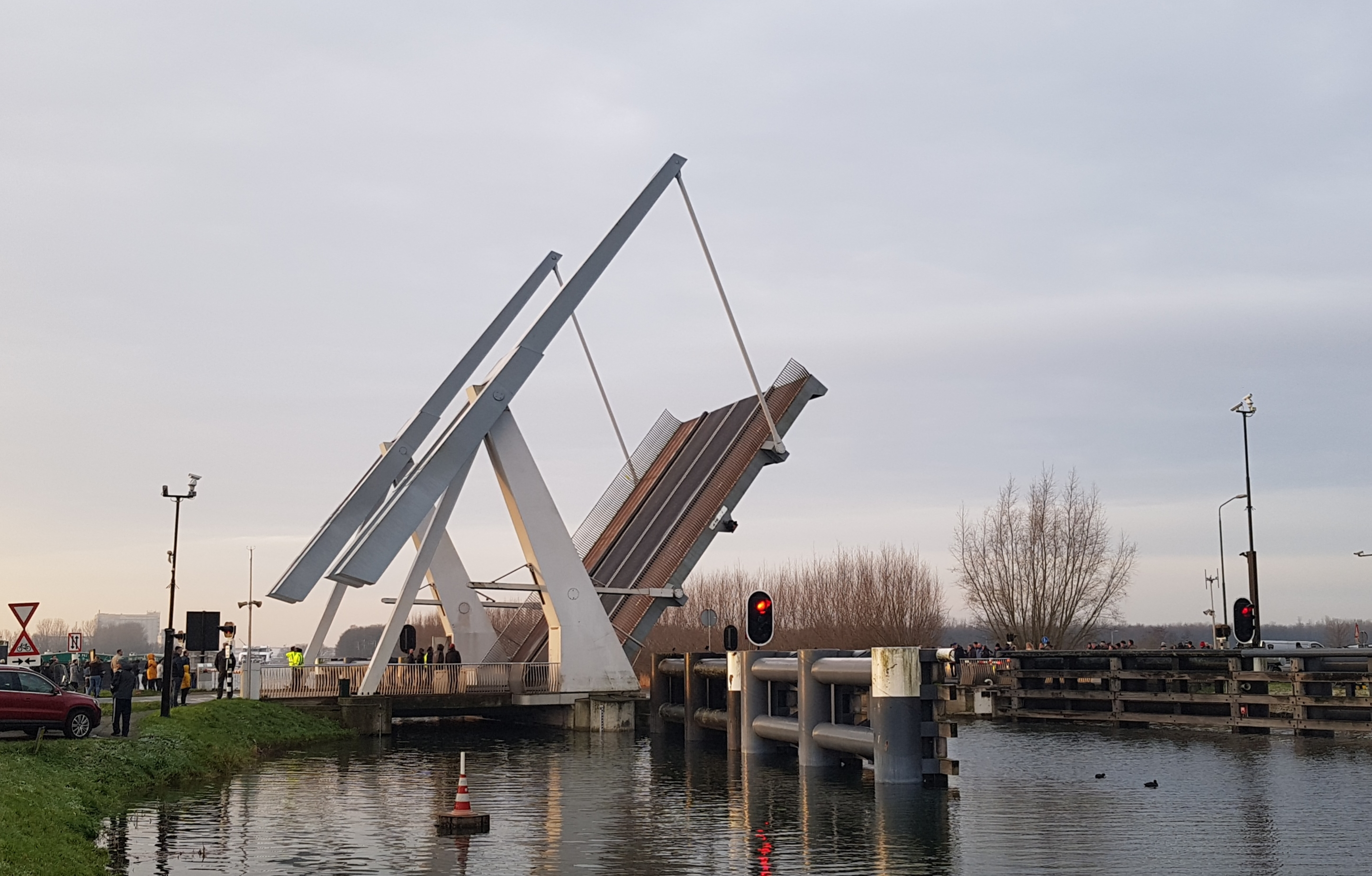
Bridge in Macharen
