= ORG-20599 =

Names
- IUPAC name (2β,3α,5β)-21-chloro-3-hydroxy-2-morpholin-4-ylpregnan-20-one
- Other names 2-chloro-1-[(2S,3S,5S,10S,13S)-3-hydroxy-10,13-dimethyl-2-morpholin-4-yl-2,3,4,5,6,7,8,9,11,12,14,15,16,17-tetradecahydro-1H-cyclopenta[a]phenanthren-17-yl]ethanone

Identifiers
CAS Number	156685-94-8
3D model (JSmol)	Interactive image
ChemSpider	8025739
PubChem CID	9850026
CompTox Dashboard (EPA)	DTXSID30349651
- InChI: InChI=1S/C25H40ClNO3/c1-24-8-7-19-17(18(24)5-6-20(24)23(29)15-26)4-3-16-13-22(28)21(14-25(16,19)2)27-9-11-30-12-10-27/h16-22,28H,3-15H2,1-2H3/t16-,17-,18-,19-,20+,21-,22-,24-,25-/m0/s1 Key: NZFNABGZEQPYBX-PMBZPZLSSA-N; InChI=1/C25H40ClNO3/c1-24-8-7-19-17(18(24)5-6-20(24)23(29)15-26)4-3-16-13-22(28)21(14-25(16,19)2)27-9-11-30-12-10-27/h16-22,28H,3-15H2,1-2H3/t16-,17-,18-,19-,20+,21-,22-,24-,25-/m0/s1 Key: NZFNABGZEQPYBX-PMBZPZLSBZ
- SMILES: C[C@]12CC[C@H]3[C@H]([C@@H]1CC[C@@H]2C(=O)CCl)CC[C@@H]4[C@@]3(C[C@@H]([C@H](C4)O)N5CCOCC5)C

Properties
Chemical formula	C_{25}H_{40}ClNO_{3}
Molar mass	438.04 g/mol
- Except where otherwise noted, data are given for materials in their standard state (at 25 °C [77 °F], 100 kPa). verify (what is ?) Infobox references

ORG-20599 is a synthetic neuroactive steroid, with sedative effects resulting from its action as a GABA_{A} receptor positive allosteric modulator and, at higher concentrations, agonist. It was developed for use as an anaesthetic agent but was never marketed for this purpose, although it is still used in scientific research.
