= Haren, North Brabant =

Haren
- Village
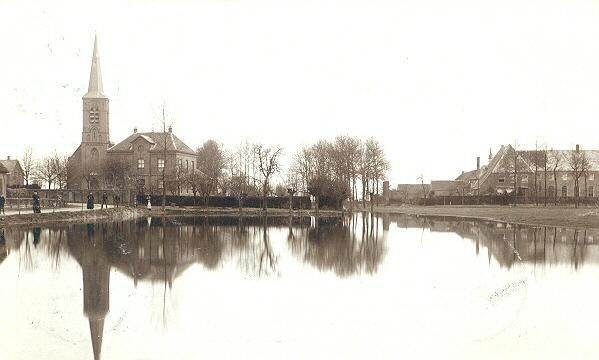
- View on Haren

- Location in the province of North Brabant in the Netherlands Haren (Netherlands)
- Coordinates: 51°48′6″N 5°35′5″E
- Country: Netherlands
- Province: North Brabant
- Municipality: Oss

Area
  - Total: 5.46 km^{2} (2.11 sq mi)
- Elevation: 6 m (20 ft)

Population (2021)
  - Total: 725
  - Density: 133/km^{2} (344/sq mi)
- Time zone: UTC+1 (CET)
  - Summer (DST): UTC+2 (CEST)
- Postal code: 5368
- Dialing code: 0412

Haren is a village in the municipality of Oss in the province of North Brabant, Netherlands.

The village was first mentioned in 1191 as "Egenus de Haren", which means "sandy ridge".

The chapel of the monastery of the Sisters of St. Francis was built in 1520. The monastery is surrounded by a moat and was buildings from the 17th century. The Catholic St Lambertus Church was built between 1867 and 1868 in Gothic Revival style.

Haren was home to 485 people in 1840. Before it became a part of the municipality Oss in 1994, Haren was a municipality together with Macharen and Megen.

== Gallery ==
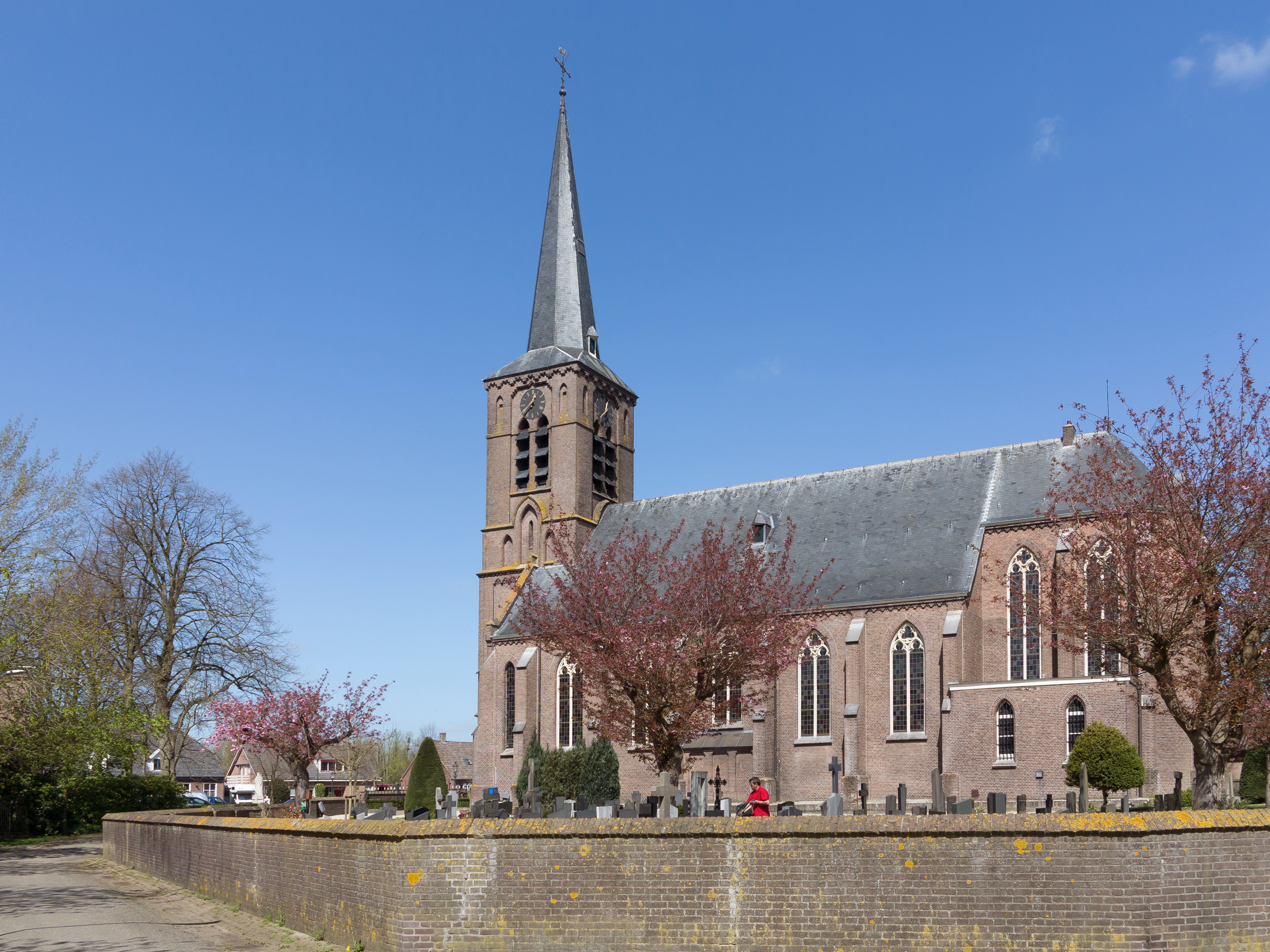
Haren, church de Sint-Lambertuskerk

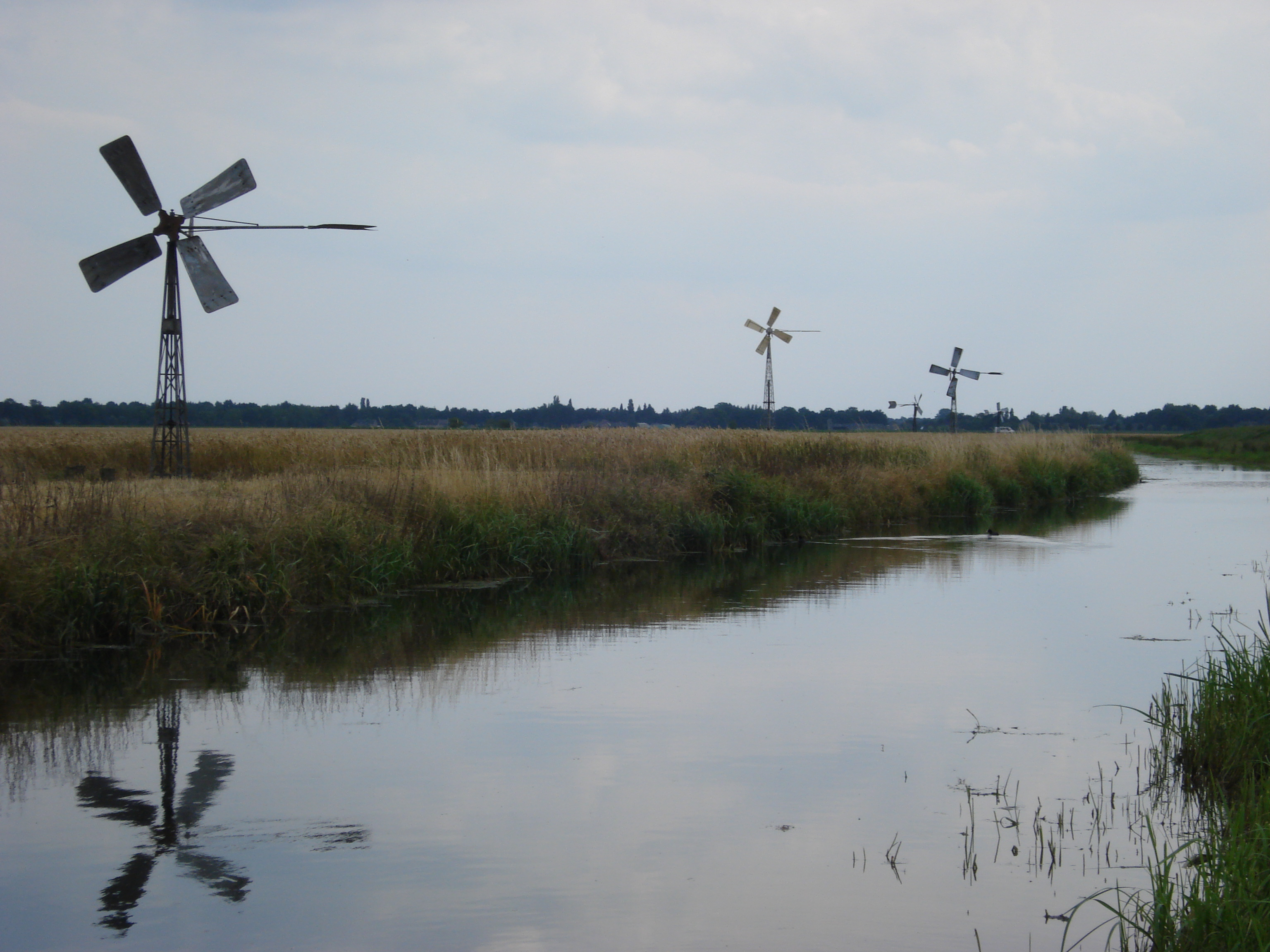
Little windmills in Haren.

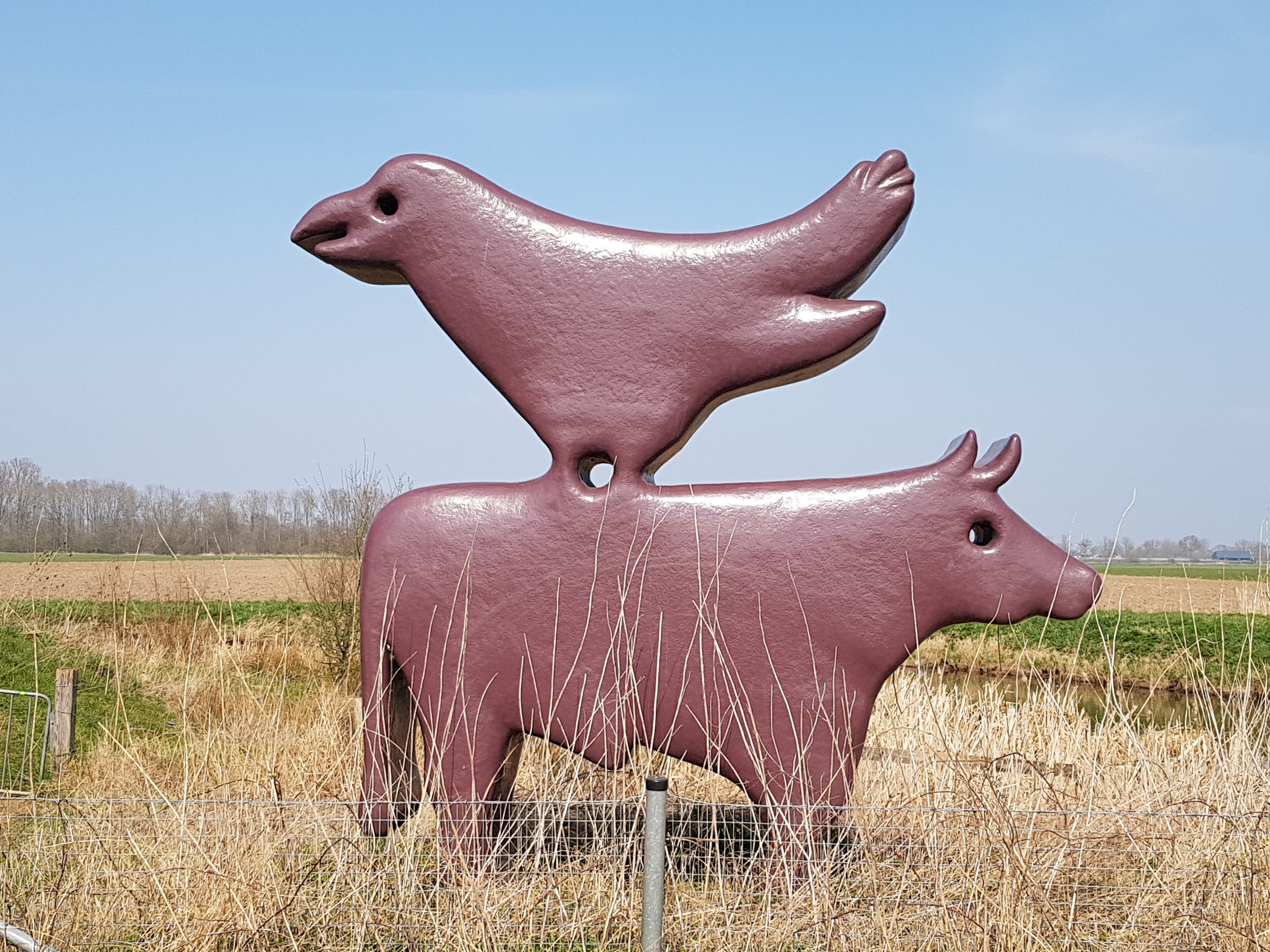
Statue of the merger of the Raven (Ravenstein) with the Ox (Oss)

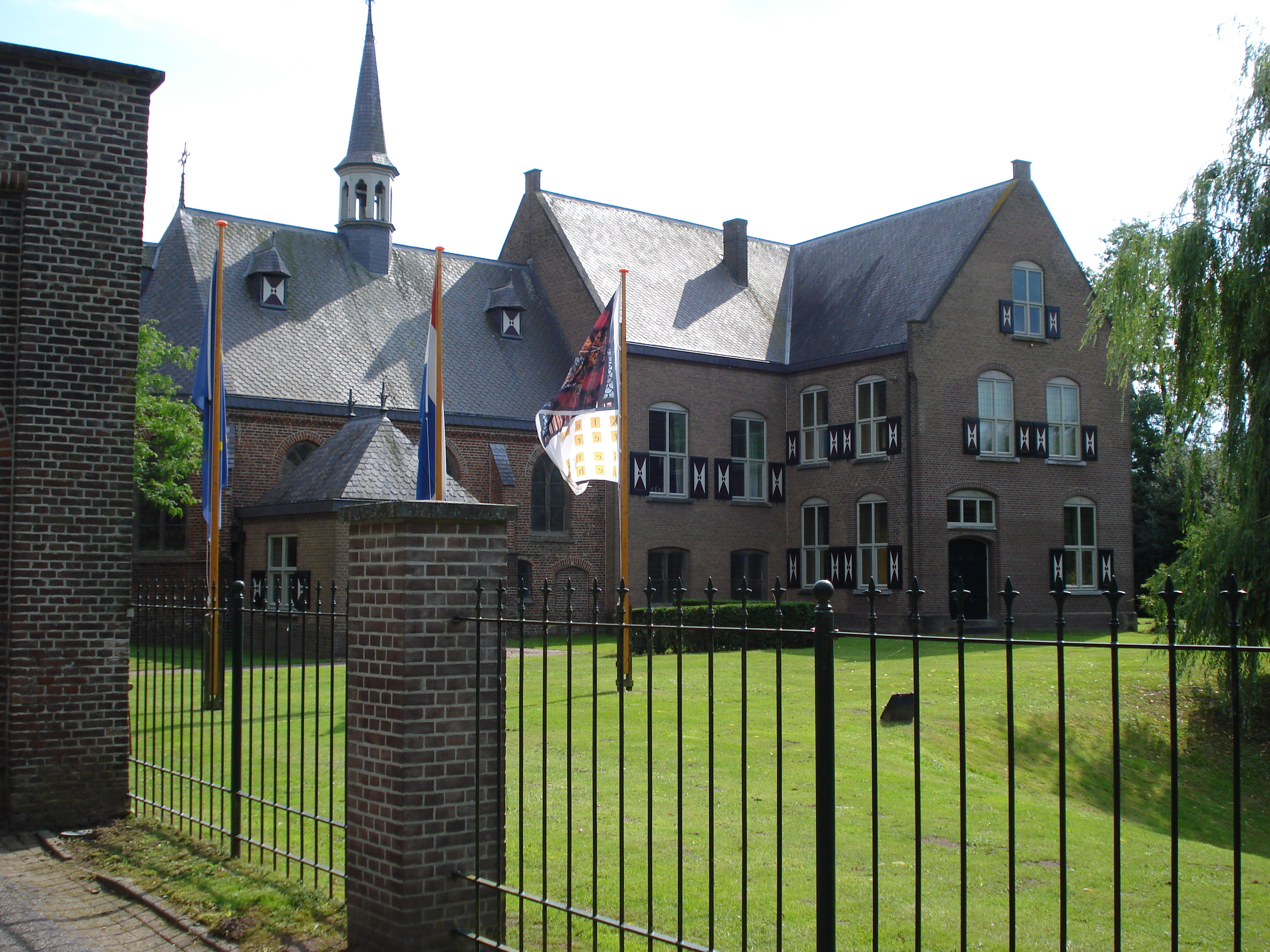
Former monastery Bethlem
