= List of people from Epsom =

Famous people from Epsom include those born here:

- Henry Dorling (died 1873), first clerk of Epsom race course And Mrs Beeton's stepfather
- James Chuter Ede, former Home Secretary, born in Epsom in 1882
- Terence Reese, bridge player, in 1913
- Petula Clark, singer, born in Epsom in 1932
- Freya Smith Dinshah, vegan activist, cofounder and current President, American Vegan Society, born in Epsom, 1941
- Sarah Miles, actress, born in Epsom, 1941
- Glyn Johns, recording engineer and record producer, in 1942
- James Whale, 1951, broadcaster, born in Ewell Village and attended Longmead Boys' School
- Jane Hutt, Labour politician serving as Member of the Welsh Parliament for the Vale of Glamorgan since 1999, was born here in 1949
- Andy Ward, drummer from the band Camel, in 1952
- Bobby G, vocalist with band Bucks Fizz, in 1953
- Ian McKay (formerly Ian Laidlaw), art critic and writer, born here in 1962
- Andrew Castle, GMTV presenter, was born in Epsom in 1963
- Alex Kingston, actress, ER attended Rosebery and was born in Epsom in 1963
- Julia Ormond, actress born in Epsom in 1965
- Jeremy Vine, BBC Radio 2 presenter was born in Epsom in 1965
- Michaela Strachan, TV broadcaster, was born in Ewell in 1966
- Simon Starling, Turner Prize 'Shedboatshed' winner, born 1967
- Mel Giedroyc, actress and comedian in 1968
- Nici Sterling, adult film actress in 1968
- Warwick Davis, actor in 1970
- Rebecca Carrington, comedian in 1971
- Alex Inglethorpe, footballer in 1971
- Neal Ardley, footballer in 1972
- Nick Easter, England international rugby union player, born 1978
- Paul Hodgson, England international rugby union player, born in 1982
- Tom Szekeres, actor, in 1983
- Freddy Eastwood, footballer, born in Epsom in 1984
- Chris Billam-Smith, cruiserweight boxer, born 1990
- Rory Burns, England international cricketer, born 1990
- Sam Smith, rugby union player for Harlequins, born 1990
- Dom Sibley, England international cricketer, born 1995
- Tyger Drew-Honey, who plays Jake in TV comedy Outnumbered was born in Epsom in 1996, and attended Epsom College.
- Catherine McCormack
- Andy Johns, record producer, sound engineer
- Thomas Mayr-Harting, former Ambassador of the European Union to the United Nations
- Martin Parr, photographer
- John Piper, painter and printmaker
- Isabella Potbury, portrait painter and suffragette
- Kathleen Riddick, British conductor
- Joe Wicks, fitness coach

Famous people from Epsom who resided here include:

- Isabella Beeton, writer famous for Mrs Beeton's Book of Household Management, lived for a while at her stepfather's house in Epsom
- Sally Mapp (c. 1706-1737) bonesetter
- John Parkhurst (1728-1797) academic, clergyman and lexicographer
- Jonathan Boucher (1738-1804 clergyman, teacher, philologist
- Archibald Primrose, 5th Earl of Rosebery (1847-1929) Prime Minister of the United Kingdom and Liberal Party MP
- Jimmy White, snooker player, lives in Epsom
- Norman Wisdom, comic actor lived in Epsom until his health declined and his family sold the flat in the early 2000s
- Frank Hampson (1918–1985) cartoonist and illustrator
- Jimmy Page, rock guitarist, founding member Led Zeppelin
- Alec Stock, former Queens Park Rangers and Fulham manager lived in Ashley Road, Epsom
- Kenneth Wolstenholme, sports broadcaster, lived by Epsom & Ewell FC grounds in West Street, Ewell for many years
- Bob Pearson, singer and pianist (of double act Bob and Alf Pearson), lived in Epsom in the 1960s
- Stanley Baker, actor, lived in Epsom for many years
- Rose Scott-Moncrieff, biochemist, died in Epsom
- Colin Southgate, businessman
- Ron Harris, Chelsea F.C. defender, nicknamed Chopper, lived in West Gardens, The Headway and his parents ran a sweet shop on Ruxley Lane in the 1960s and 1970s
- Joe Strummer, lead singer and co-founder of The Clash
- John Challis, actor, resided on the Woodcote Estate in Epsom as a child.
- Nadia Essex, TV personality
- Tim Palmer, music producer and mixer went to Glyn School and Ewell Castle.

Famous people, past and present who are associated with Epsom include:

- Jack Ashley, Labour MP now Baron Ashley of Stoke
- Efan Ekoku, footballer
- Tom Felton, actor
- Evelyn Glennie, musician, attended Rosebery
- Tim Vine, comic actor
- Ameet Chana, actor
- Jody Morris, footballer, grew up on the Longmead Estate
- Stedman Pearson, singer/member of the pop group Five Star, attended Laine Theatre Arts

See also: winners of The Derby; Epsom College and Rosebery School

- Andrew Garfield, actor, (The Amazing Spider-Man, The Social Network)
- David Vine, TV broadcaster
- Louis Cole, YouTuber
- Peter Xavier Price, illustrator and academic
- Steven Savile, writer
- Nici Sterling, adult film actor
- Johnny Haynes, professional footballer
