= Samuel Orchart Beeton =

English publisher (1831-1877)

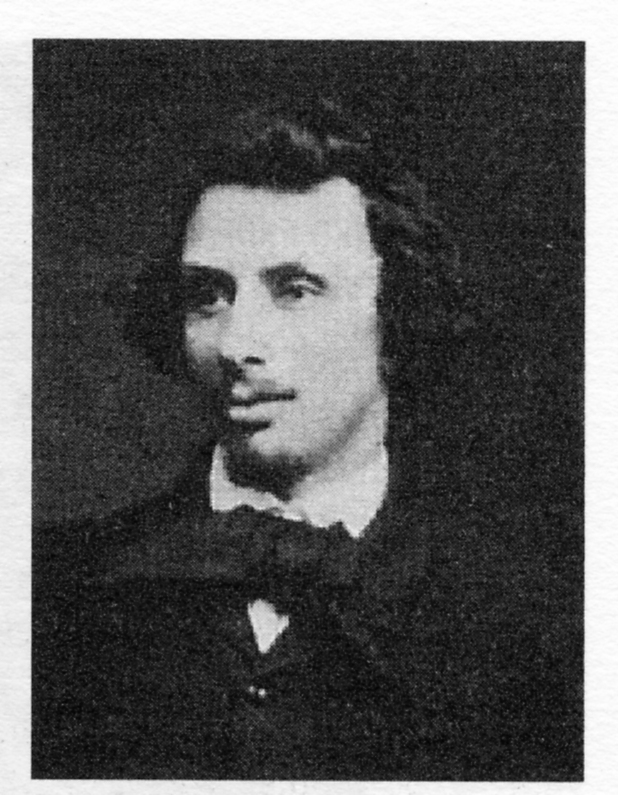
Samuel Beeton in 1860

Samuel Orchart Beeton (2 March 1831 – 6 June 1877) was an English publisher, best known as the husband of Mrs Beeton (Isabella Mary Mayson) and publisher of Mrs Beeton's Book of Household Management. He also founded and published Boy's Own Magazine (1855–90), the first and most influential boys' magazine.

== Publishing career ==
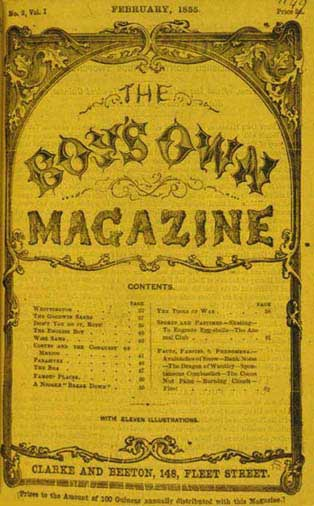
Beeton's Boy's Own Magazine, 1855–1890, was the first and most influential boys' magazine.

Beeton made money as the first British publisher of Uncle Tom's Cabin in 1852, securing the rights from the then-unknown Harriet Beecher Stowe. He was clever enough to realise that it would sell and the underlying message of the story underwrote his politics. In the year it was published he launched The Englishwoman's Domestic Magazine, a pioneering serial for middle-class women, the same year. His Boy's Own Magazine, published in the UK from 1855 to 1890, was the first and most influential boys' magazine.

Beeton married Isabella Mary Mayson in 1856. She began writing for The Englishwoman's Domestic Magazine, and contributed to the growing success of the business.

He founded Beeton's Christmas Annual paperback magazine in 1860 and in the following year he launched a weekly magazine titled "The Queen" about fashion and culture for upper-class women of society. The title was merged to "The Queen: The Ladies Newspaper and Court Chronicle" in 1864, although Beeton had sold his interest in 1862 to Serjeant Cox.

In 1887 Beeton's Christmas Annual featured A Study In Scarlet, a story by Sir Arthur Conan Doyle which was also the first work of literature to feature Sherlock Holmes.

Mrs Beeton's Book of Household Management was published in 1861. Beeton followed it with a series of other self-help textbooks, including Beeton's Book of Needlework, Beeton's Dictionary of Geography, Beeton's Book of Birds, Beeton's Book of Poultry and Domestic Animals, Beeton's Book of Home Pets, Beeton's Book of Anecdote, Wit and Humour, Beeton's Dictionary of Natural History, and others. He also produced an edition of the works of Francis Bacon.

== Later life ==
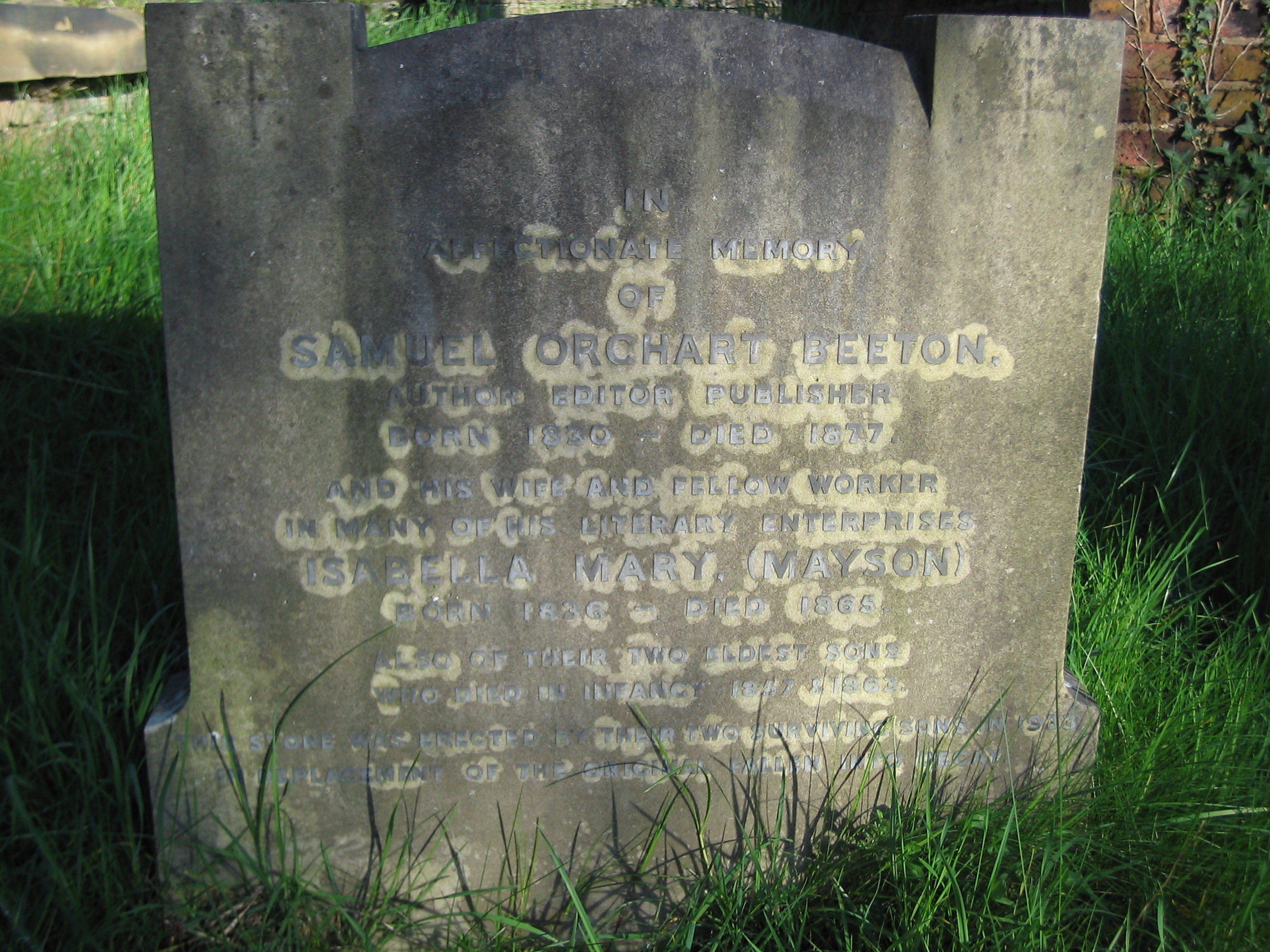
Headstone of Samuel and Isabella Beeton, West Norwood Cemetery.

After his wife Isabella died in 1865, Beeton's fortunes failed and he was obliged to sell the rights to the "Beeton" name to rival publishers, such as Ward, Lock & Co. and Frederick Warne & Co., and work for them for a salary. His last years were clouded by the tuberculosis from which he ultimately died, in 1877 aged 46. He was buried in his wife's grave in West Norwood Cemetery.

== Fiction ==
The 2006 TV drama The Secret Life of Mrs Beeton, based in part on Kathryn Hughes' biography The Short Life & Long Times of Mrs Beeton, implied that Isabella Beeton suffered from syphilis contracted from Samuel, and that this could have led to her early death and those of her first two children, and an alleged number of early miscarriages, although there is no evidence for this speculation.
