= Mrs. Beeton's Book of Household Management =

1861 book by Isabella Beeton

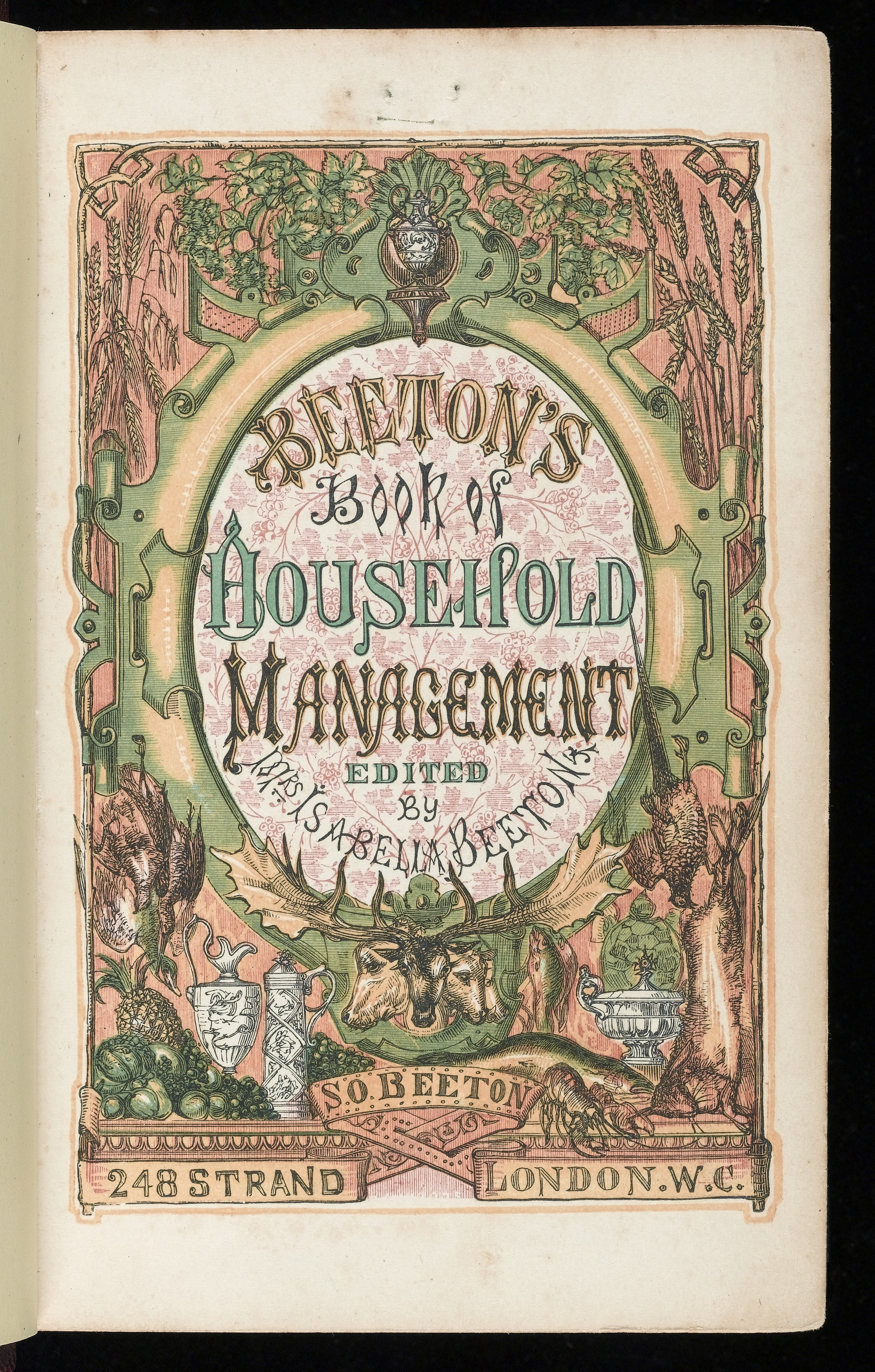
- Title page: the first edition did not use the "Mrs." of later editions.
- Author: Isabella Beeton
- Language: English
- Subject: Cookery
- Genre: Manual
- Publisher: S. O. Beeton Publishing
- Publication date: 1861
- Text: Mrs. Beeton's Book of Household Management at Wikisource

Mrs. Beeton's Book of Household Management, also published as Mrs. Beeton's Cookery Book, is an extensive guide to running a household in Victorian Britain, edited by Isabella Beeton and first published as a book in 1861. Previously published in parts, it initially and briefly bore the title Beeton's Book of Household Management, as one of the series of guidebooks published by her husband, Samuel Beeton. The recipes were highly structured, in contrast to those in earlier cookbooks. It was illustrated with many monochrome and colour plates.

Although Mrs. Beeton died in 1865, the book continued to be a best-seller. The first editions after her death contained an obituary notice, but later editions did not, allowing readers to imagine that every word was written by an experienced Mrs. Beeton personally. Many of the recipes were copied from the most successful cookery books of the day, including Eliza Acton's Modern Cookery for Private Families (first published in 1845), Elizabeth Raffald's The Experienced English Housekeeper (originally published in 1769), Marie-Antoine Carême's Le Pâtissier royal Parisien (1815), Hannah Glasse's The Art of Cookery Made Plain and Easy (1747), Maria Eliza Rundell's A New System of Domestic Cookery (1806), and the works of Charles Elmé Francatelli (1805–1876). This practice of Mrs. Beeton's has in modern times repeatedly been described as plagiarism.

The book expanded steadily in length until by 1907 it reached 74 chapters and over 2,000 pages. Nearly two million copies were sold by 1868, and as of 2016 it remains in print. Between 1875 and 1914 it was probably the most often-consulted cookery book. Mrs. Beeton has been compared on the strength of the book with modern "domestic goddesses" like Nigella Lawson and Delia Smith.

== History ==
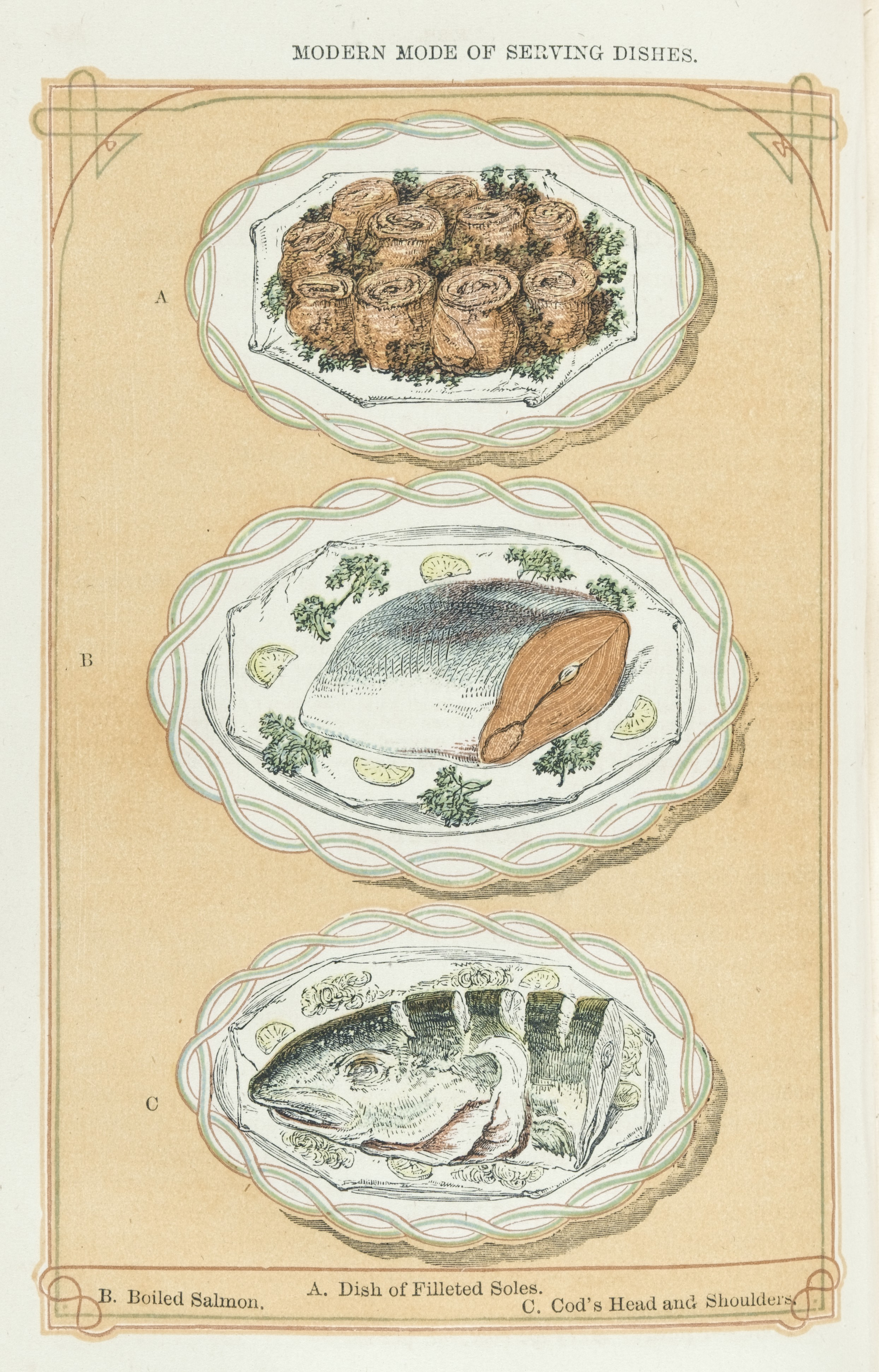
Presentation of fish dishes: filleted soles, boiled salmon, cod's head and shoulders

The author, Isabella Beeton, was 21 years old when she started working on the book. It was initially serialised in 24 monthly instalments, in her husband Samuel Orchart Beeton's publication The Englishwoman's Domestic Magazine; the first instalment appeared in 1859. On 1 October 1861, the instalments were collected into one volume with the title The Book of Household Management, comprising information for the Mistress, Housekeeper, Cook, Kitchen-Maid, Butler, Footman, Coachman, Valet, Upper and Under House-Maids, Lady's-Maid, Maid-of-all-Work, Laundry-Maid, Nurse and Nurse-Maid, Monthly Wet and Sick Nurses, etc. etc. – also Sanitary, Medical, & Legal Memoranda: with a History of the Origin, Properties, and Uses of all Things Connected with Home Life and Comfort.

In its preface she wrote:

I must frankly own, that if I had known, beforehand, that this book would have cost me the labour which it has, I should never have been courageous enough to commence it. What moved me, in the first instance, to attempt a work like this, was the discomfort and suffering which I had seen brought upon men and women by household mismanagement. I have always thought that there is no more fruitful source of family discontent than a housewife's badly-cooked dinners and untidy ways.

Beeton's half-sister, Lucy Smiles, was later asked by her son about her memories of the book's development, for the centenary of Beeton's birth, 1936. She recalled:

Different people gave their recipes for the book. That for Baroness pudding (a suet pudding with a plethora of raisins) was given by the Baroness de Tessier, who lived at Epsom. No recipe went into the book without a successful trial, and the home at Pinner was the scene of many experiments and some failures. I remember Isabella coming out of the kitchen one day, 'This won't do at all,' she said, and gave me the cake that had turned out like a biscuit. I thought it very good. It had currants in it.

Previously published as a part-work, it was first published as a book in 1861 by S. O. Beeton Publishing, 161 Bouverie Street, London, a firm founded by Samuel Beeton. The book was an immediate best-seller, selling 60,000 copies in its first year and totalling nearly two million by 1868. In 2010 a copy of the first edition of Household Management in "top condition" was stated to be worth more than £1,000. In 1863 a revised edition was issued.

In 1866, a year after Isabella's death, Samuel was in debt due to the collapse of Overend and Gurney, a London discount house to which he owed money. To save himself from bankruptcy he sold the copyright to all of his publications for a little over £19,000. Of that, the rights to Household Management were sold to publishers Ward, Lock and Tyler for £3,250. The early editions included an obituary notice for Beeton, but the publishers insisted it be removed "allowing readers to imagine – perhaps even as late as 1915 – that some mob-capped matriarch was out there still keeping an eye on them".

Revisions to Household Management by its publisher have continued to the present day. The effort has kept the Beeton name in the public eye for over 125 years, although current editions are far removed from those published in Mrs. Beeton's lifetime. By 1906 the book had 2,056 pages, "exclusive of advertising", with 3,931 recipes and was "half as large again" as the previous edition.

== Book ==
=== Contents ===
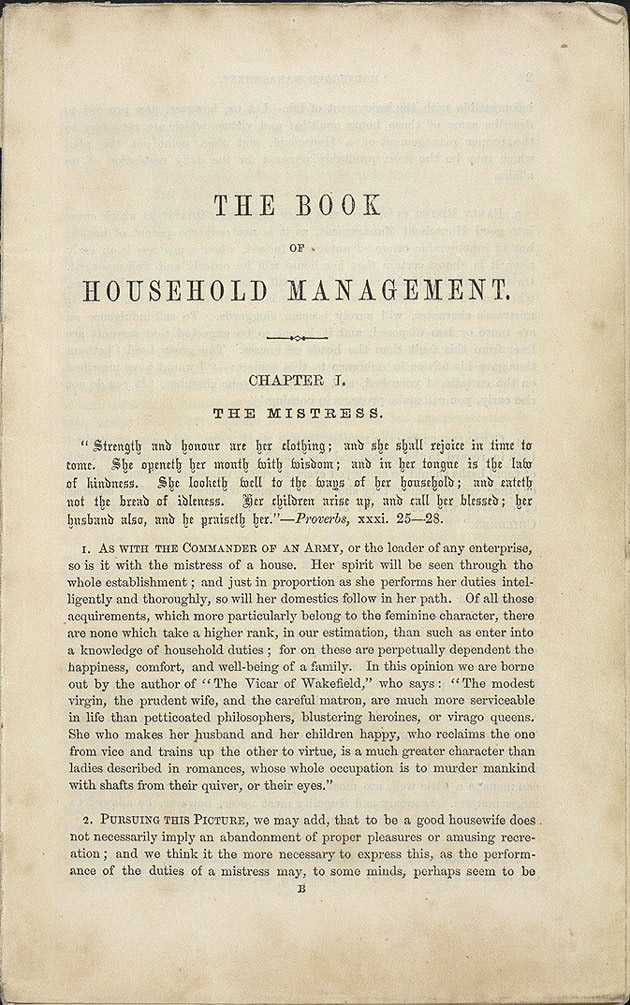
First page of the first chapter of Book of Household Management

The following description refers to the 1907 edition; the book was greatly extended in the decades since Mrs. Beeton's death (in 1865) to 74 chapters and over 2000 pages; the first edition had 44 chapters.

The book begins with general chapters on the duties of the "mistress", the housekeeper, and the cook. There follow chapters on the kitchen itself, "marketing" (choosing good-quality produce at the market), and an introduction to cookery (Chapter 6). Together, these take up over 100 pages. Chapters seven to 38 (roughly 1000 pages) cover English cooking, with recipes for soups, gravies, fish, meat (principally veal, beef, mutton and lamb, and pork), poultry, game, preserves, vegetables, pastries, puddings, sweets, jams, pickles, and savouries. Chapter 39 describes the "art of carving at table", supported by eleven illustrations. Chapters 40 to 50 (some 200 pages) give instructions for dairy products, vegetarian and invalid (sick person) cookery, making bread, biscuits and cakes, and beverages. Chapters 51 to 59 describe cooking in various international styles including French, German, Spanish, Jewish, Australian, South African, Indian, American, and Canadian cookery. Chapters 60 to 68 guide on matters from trussing poultry to the definitions of culinary terms, arranging meals, decorating the table, making menus, and the duties of domestic servants. Chapters 69 to 73 describe "household recipes" and medical preparations. The final chapter, 74, offers "legal memoranda".

There is a detailed index. The edition includes advertisements for products such as "Lemco" beef extract and "Cadbury's Cocoa".

=== Approach ===
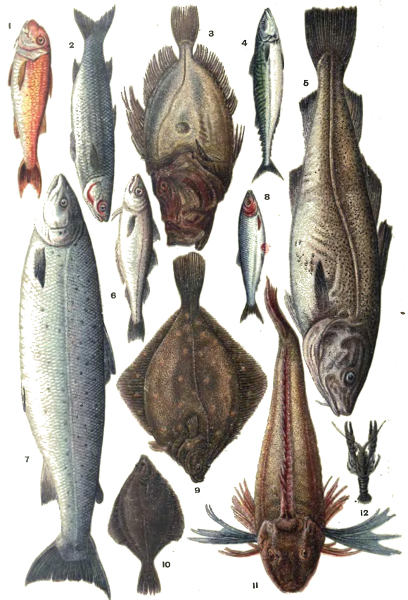
Full-page 1907 colour plate of types of fish to buy from the fishmonger: red mullet, grayling, John Dory, mackerel, cod, whiting, salmon, herring, plaice, flounder, gurnet, crayfish

The preface sets out the book's goal of providing men with such well-cooked food at home that it may compete with what they could eat "at their clubs, well-ordered taverns, and dining-houses". Mrs. Beeton claims that:

I have attempted to give, under the chapters devoted to cookery, an intelligible arrangement to every recipe, a list of the ingredients, a plain statement of the mode of preparing each dish, and a careful estimate of its cost, the number of people for whom it is sufficient, and the time when it is seasonable

She explains that she was thus attempting to make the basics of cookery "intelligible" to any "housewife".

The first chapter sets the tone of the book with a quotation from the Book of Proverbs, and in early editions cites also The Vicar of Wakefield with:

The modest virgin, the prudent wife, and the careful matron, are much more serviceable in life than petticoated philosophers, blustering heroines, or virago queens. She who makes her husband and her children happy, who reclaims the one from vice and trains up the other to virtue

The book thus advocates early rising, cleanliness, frugality, good temper, and the wisdom of interviewing servants rather than relying on written references.

Cookery is introduced with words about "the progress of mankind from barbarism to civilization", with a mention of man "in his primitive state, [living] upon roots and the fruits of the earth", rising to become in turn "a hunter and a fisher"; then a "herdsman" and finally "the comfortable condition of a farmer." It is granted that "the fruits of the earth, the fowls of the air, the beasts of the field, and the fish of the sea, are still the only food of mankind", but that:

[T]hese are so prepared, improved, and dressed by skill and ingenuity, that they are the means of immeasurably extending the boundaries of human enjoyments.

The text then swiftly passes to a description of simple measures like a table-spoonful, and the duties of servants.

The whole rest of the book is taken up with instructions for cooking, with an introduction in each chapter to the type of food it describes. The first of these, on soups, begins "Lean, juicy beef, mutton, and veal form the basis of all good soups; therefore it is advisable to procure those pieces which afford the richest succulence, and such as are fresh-killed." The account of how to make soup consists of a single essay, divided into general advice and numbered steps for making any kind of (meat-based) soup. This is followed in early editions by a separate chapter of recipes for soups of different kinds.

Each recipe is structured into a title, a list of ingredients (with quantities, either natural – as a number of eggs or vegetables, a number of slices of ham – or measured in Imperial units – ounces of salt, quarts of water. The actual instructions are headed "Mode", as "Cut up the veal, and put it with the bones and trimmings of poultry". A separate section gives the overall preparation time, and the average cost as, for example, "9d. per quart". (Note: "d" means a penny, 1/240 of a pound sterling.) Many recipes state in separate brief sections when a recipe is "seasonable" and for how many persons it is "sufficient". Finally, a "note" gives any required advice, such as "When stronger stock is desired, double the quantity of veal, or put in an old fowl." This highly structured presentation was the book's main innovation.

=== Oddities ===
(The tomato's) flavour stimulates the appetite and is almost universally approved. The Tomato is a wholesome fruit, and digests easily. ... it has been found to contain a particular acid, a volatile oil, a brown, very fragrant extracto-resinous matter, a vegeto-mineral matter, muco-saccharine, some salts, and, in all probability, an alkaloid. The whole plant has a disagreeable odour, and its juice, subjected to the action of the fire, emits a vapour so powerful as to cause vertigo and vomiting.

— Book of Household Management sections 1158–1159. The conflicting opinions on the tomato occurring on the same page have been noted as seemingly careless editing.

Despite professing to be a guide of reliable information about every aspect of running a house for the aspirant middle classes, the original edition devotes 23 pages to household management, then discusses cooking for almost all of the other 900. Even with the emphasis on food, some of her cooking advice is so odd as to suggest that she had little experience preparing meals. For example, the book recommends boiling pasta for an hour and forty-five minutes. Like many other British people of her social class and generation, Mrs. Beeton adopted a distaste for unfamiliar foods, saying that mangoes tasted like turpentine, lobsters were indigestible, garlic was offensive, potatoes were "suspicious; a great many are narcotic, and many are deleterious", cheese could only be consumed by sedentary people, and tomatoes were either good or bad for a range of reasons.

Unlike earlier cookbook authors, such as Hannah Glasse, the book offered an "emphasis on thrift and economy". It also discarded the style of previous writers who employed "daunting paragraph[s] of text with ingredients and method jumbled up together" for what is a recognisably modern "user-friendly formula listing ingredients, method, timings and even the estimated cost of each recipe".

=== Plagiarism ===
In a critical letter, Mrs. Beeton's acquaintance Mrs. Henrietta Mary Pourtois English advised her that "Cookery is a Science that is only learnt by Long Experience (Note: Emphasis in the original.) and years of study which of course you have not had. Therefore my advice would be to compile a book from recipes from a Variety of the Best Books published on Cookery and Heaven knows there is a great variety for you to choose from." The recipes were largely copied from the most successful cookery books of the day, the copying in several cases unacknowledged in the text. The "variety" included Eliza Acton's Modern Cookery for Private Families and her The English Bread–Book, (Note: Acton is acknowledged with "The following observations are extracted from a valuable work on Bread-making,† and will be found very useful to our readers ... [Footnote: †'The English Bread–Book.' By Eliza Acton. London: Longman.]".) Elizabeth Raffald's The Experienced English Housekeeper, Marie-Antoine Carême's Le Pâtissier royal Parisien, Louis Eustache Ude's The French Cook, (Note: Ude is however acknowledged in chapters 6, 17, 21, 23 and 27.) Alexis Soyer's The Modern Housewife or, Ménagère and The Pantropheon, Hannah Glasse's The Art of Cookery Made Plain and Easy, Maria Eliza Rundell's A New System of Domestic Cookery, and the works of Charles Elmé Francatelli.

In modern times Mrs. Beeton's practice has been criticised as plagiarism; Beeton's modern biographer Kathryn Hughes talks of her "lifting" and "brazenly copying" recipes from others, and says that this was "the way that cookery books had been put together from time immemorial ...". The New York Times said, "Isabella [Beeton] plagiarised only the best". This led to the comment that "Mrs Beeton couldn't cook but she could copy". Hughes recounts that Beeton's "first recipe for Victoria sponge was so inept that she left out the eggs" and that her work was "brazenly copied ... almost word for word, from books as far back as the Restoration". The influential 20th-century food writer Elizabeth David dismissed her as "a plagiarist" and later wrote: "I wonder if I would have ever learned to cook at all if I had been given a routine Mrs. Beeton to learn from".

=== Illustrations ===
The 1907 edition runs to some 30 full-page colour plates and over 100 full-page illustrations in monochrome. These include photographs, such as of the housekeeper standing with hands behind her back in her kitchen, facing the first page of Chapter two, "The Housekeeper". An idea of the amount of detail may be gained from the fact that there are eleven illustrations of types of fish, such as "steamed sole" and "soused mackerel", and another of "fish entrées".

One full-page colour plate illustrated a range of puddings, showing jelly, raspberry cream, a centre dish piled high with fruits, a trifle, and an ornamental flowerpot containing a strawberry plant.

Another full-page colour plate showed a variety of fruits including apricots, white and black cherries, white, red, and black currants, a melon, strawberries, and varieties of plums, all piled high on circular dishes or fruit stands.

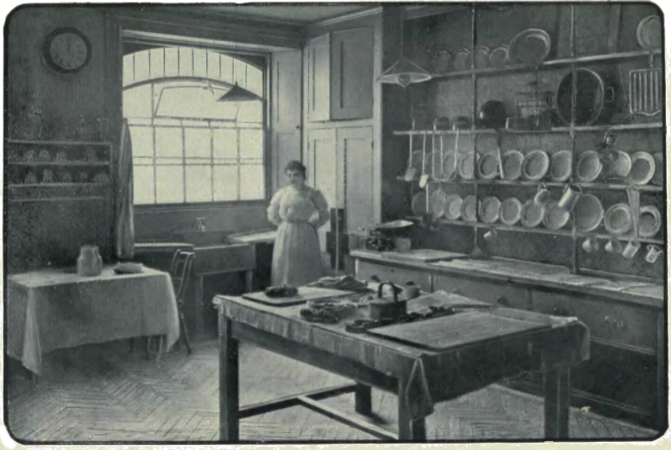
Kitchen with a housekeeper, 1907

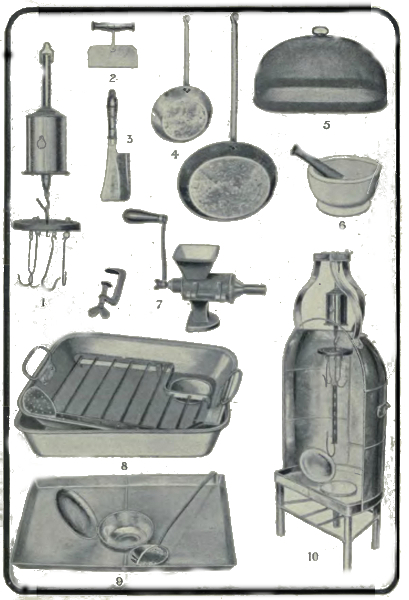
Kitchen equipment, 1907

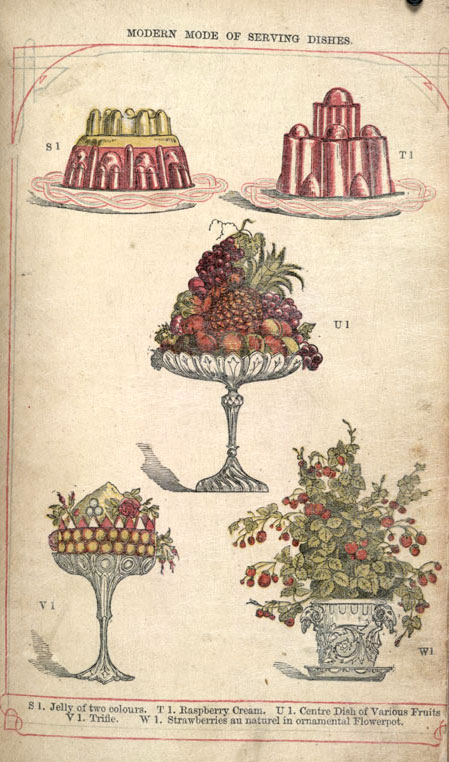
Full-page colour plate of puddings

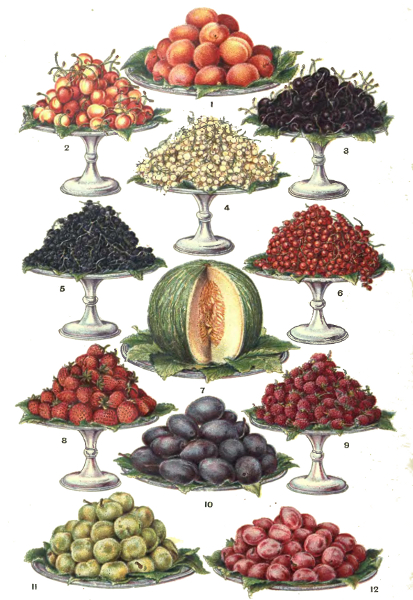
Full-page colour plate of fruits

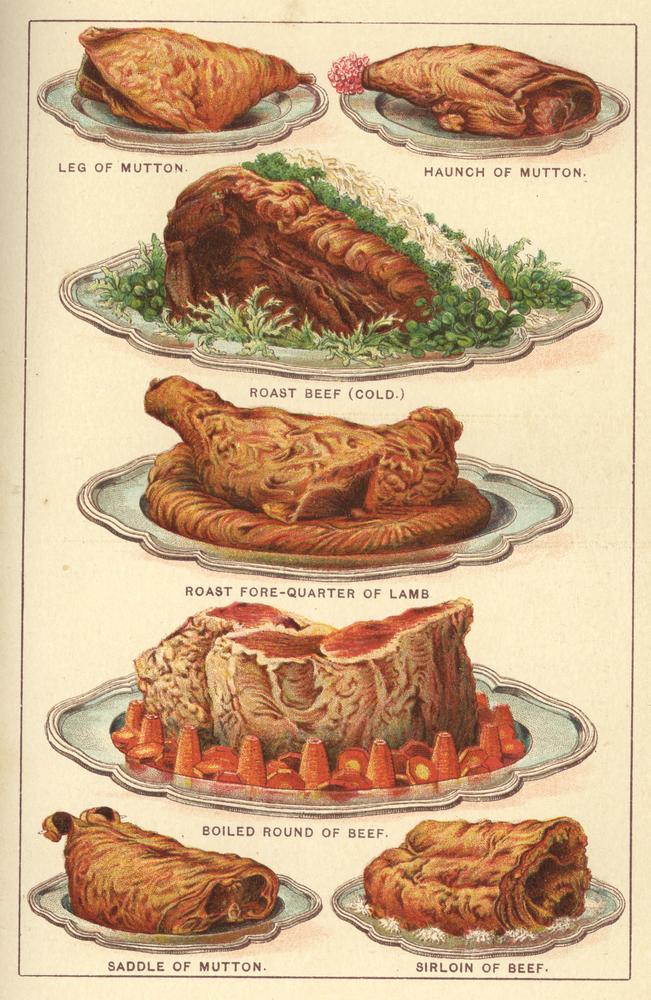
Roast meats, 1901

== Influence and legacy ==
=== Contemporary ===
The preface of Wilhelmina Rawson's Queensland Cookery and Poultry Book (1878), published in Australia, observes that: "Mrs. Lance Rawson's Cookery Book ... is written entirely for the Colonies, and for the middle classes, and for those people who cannot afford to buy a Mrs. Beeton or a Warne, but who can afford the three shillings for this."

The Oxford English Dictionary recognised that, by the 1890s, Beeton's name "was adopted as a term for an authority on all things domestic and culinary". The Robert Mondavi Institute for Wine and Food Science observed that "it was probably found in more homes than any other cookery book, and [was probably] the most often consulted, in the years 1875 to 1914".

A chapter of Sir Arthur Conan Doyle's novel A Duet, with an Occasional Chorus (1899) is entitled, "Concerning Mrs. Beeton"; a character declares: "Mrs. Beeton must have been the finest housekeeper in the world, therefore Mr. Beeton must have been the happiest and most comfortable man".

=== Modern ===
Mrs. Beeton has been described as "the grandmother of modern domestic goddesses", like Nigella Lawson and Delia Smith, who saw, as Beeton did, the need to provide reassuring advice on culinary matters for the British middle classes. However, while Lawson and Smith "insist that cooking can be easy, fun and uncomplicated", Beeton "acknowledges the labour and skill required to cook well".

The book is referenced repeatedly in The Wind in the Willows episode "The Masterchef". Mr. Toad attempts to make an apricot souffle, but the wind blows the pages to a "mustard and linseed poultice" remedy from the medical preparations section midway through. He fails to notice. Luckily, the linseed oil ignites in the oven and destroys the dish before he can serve it to his friends.

The food writer and chef Gerard Baker tested and revised 220 of Beeton's recipes, and published the result as Mrs. Beeton: How To Cook (2011).

For the book's 150th anniversary in 2011, the Royal Society of Chemistry planned to feature one of Beeton's recipes. Due to the financial climate at the time in wake of the Great Recession, the Society selected Beeton's toast sandwich, a dish that Beeton included to cater to the less well-off.

In 2012, the food economist for the British television period drama Downton Abbey described Beeton's book as an "important guide" for the food served in the series.

== Editions ==
The book has appeared in many editions, including:

Editions
- 1st edition in 24 monthly parts, S. O. Beeton, 1859–1861
- 1st bound edition, S. O. Beeton, 1861.
- New edition, Ward, Lock & Tyler, 1861
- S. O. Beeton, 1864
- Ward, Lock, 1865
- S. O. Beeton, 1865
- S. O. Beeton, 1866
- Ward, Lock & Tyler, 1867
- 3rd edition, Ward, Lock & Tyler, 1868
- New edition, Ward, Lock & Tyler, 1869
- Ward, Lock & Tyler, 1870
- New edition, Ward, Lock & Tyler, 1878
- London and New York: Ward, Lock, 1879
- Entirely new edition, London: Ward, Lock, 1880
- Entirely new edition, London and New York: Ward, Lock, 1886
- London: Ward, Lock, 1888
- London: Ward, Lock, 1890
- London: Ward, Lock, 1891
- London: Ward, Lock, Bowden, 1891
- Melbourne: E. W. Cole, 1891
- London, New York, Melbourne, Sydney: Ward, Lock, Bowden, 1892
- London, New York: Ward, Lock, Bowden, 1893
- London, New York: Ward, Lock, Bowden, 1894
- London: Ward, Lock, Bowden, 1895
- London and New York: Ward, Lock, Bowden, 1896. Six hundred and twentieth thousand.
- London, New York, Melbourne: Ward, Lock, 1898
- London, New York: Ward, Lock, 1899
- London: Ward, Lock, 1900
- London, Melbourne: Ward, Lock, 1901
- Sydney: Anthony Hordern & Sons, 1901
- London: Ward, Lock, 1902
- Melbourne: Foy & Gibson, 1902
- London: Ward, Lock, 1903
- London: Ward, Lock, 1904
- London: Ward, Lock, 1905
- London: Ward, Lock, 1906
- Adelaide: E. S. Wigg & Son, 1906
- Ward, Lock, 1907
- London, New York: Ward, Lock, 1908
- London, Melbourne: Ward, Lock, 1909
- London, New York, Melbourne: Ward, Lock, 1910
- London: Ward, Lock, 1911
- London, Melbourne, Toronto: Ward, Lock, 1912
- London: Ward, Lock, 1913
- London: Ward, Lock, 1914
- London: Ward, Lock, 1915
- London, Melbourne: Ward, Lock, 1920
- London, Melbourne: Ward, Lock, 1923
- London, Melbourne, Sydney: Ward, Lock, 1924
- London, Melbourne, New York: Ward, Lock, 1925
- London, Melbourne: Ward, Lock, 1926
- London, Melbourne: Ward, Lock, 1927
- London: Ward, Lock, 1929
- London, Melbourne: Ward, Lock, 1932
- London: Ward, Lock, 1936
- London, Melbourne: Ward, Lock, 1939
- London: Ward, Lock, 1948
- London: Ward, Lock, 1949
- London, Melbourne: Ward, Lock, 1950
- London, Melbourne: Ward, Lock, 1951
- London: Ward, Lock, 1952
- Ward, Lock, 1960
- London: Ward, Lock, 1961
- London: Pan Books, 1961
- London: Ward, Lock, 1962
- London: Ward, Lock, 1963
- London: Pan Books, 1963
- Facsimile edition, London: Jonathan Cape, 1968
- New York: Farrar, Straus, and Giroux, 1969
- London: Ward Lock, 1969
- London: Ward Lock, 1971
- London: Pan Books, 1972
- London: Ward Lock, 1972
- New York: Crescent Books, 1972
- Facsimile edition, London: Jonathan Cape, 1974
- New York: Farrar, Straus, and Giroux, 1977
- Facsimile edition, London, New York: S. O. Beeton, 1977
- London: Ward Lock, 1978
- Adelaide: Rigby, 1981
- London: Ward Lock, 1982
- London: Chancellor Press, 1982
- London: Chancellor Press, 1984
- New York: Exeter Books, 1986
- Facsimile edition, London: Jonathan Cape, 1986
- London: Ward Lock, 1986
- London: Ward Lock, 1989
- London: Ward Lock, 1990
- London: Ward Lock, 1991
- London: Ward Lock, 1992
- London: Ward Lock, 1993.
- London: Chancellor, 1994
- Lewes: Southover Press, 1998
- London: Brockhampton, 1999
- London: Cassell, 2000
- Oxford: Oxford University Press, 2000
- London: Brockhampton, 2000
- London: Brockhampton, 2001
- New York: Barnes & Noble digital, 2002
- Lewes: Southover, 2003
- Ware: Wordsworth Editions, 2006
- London: Impala, 2006
- New York: Cosimo Classics, 2007
- Oxford: Oxford University Press, 2008
- Oxford: Benediction Press, 2010
