= Edwin Brett =

Victorian editor and publisher

Edwin John Brett (1828–1895) was a Victorian editor and publisher of boys' magazines, romantic fiction and "penny dreadfuls" who pioneered the weekly format of serialised and sensational fiction.

== Early life ==
Edwin Brett was born in White Horse Lane, Canterbury, the son of Thomas Brett (c.1777–1867), an army officer, and his wife, Mary. At fourteen he was apprenticed to a local watchmaker, but soon moved to London, where he was employed as an artist-engraver and joined a radical Chartist circle that included Feargus O'Connor, Charles Cochrane, George William MacArthur Reynolds and George Augustus Sala, the latter two becoming lifelong friends.

== Career ==
Brett entered into an informal partnership with Ebenezer Landells (1808-1860), the Newcastle artist engraver, small publisher and one of the moving forces behind the satirical magazine Punch. In September 1860 Brett attempted a take-over of the editorship of the Illustrated Inventor published by his professional mentor, the Liberal MP Herbert Ingram, but was thwarted when Ingram and his son drowned in an excursion ship collision on Lake Michigan. In 1864, together with the publisher William Laurence Emmett, he took over the English Girl's Journal and Ladies' Magazine, from the publisher Edward Harrison, which folded the following year. The failure of this partnership was to lead to an intense publishing rivalry between Emmett and Brett.

After unsuccessfully experimenting with a couple of small format weeklies, The Boys' Companion and British Traveller and The Boys' Own Reader, Brett joined the Newsagents' Publishing Company (NPC) at 147 Fleet Street, where, with aggressive marketing and shrewd identification of his target readership, he pioneered a series of best-selling boys' periodicals. Under his management the NPC developed a new sub-genre in sensational 'penny-dreadful' fiction featuring young heroes in tales which were often brutal, glamorising highwaymen and burglars.

In 1866 he started his own periodical, Boys of England, at 173 Fleet Street, a weekly magazine blending thrilling fiction and factual articles which was published for 33 years. Articles exhorted boys to participate in healthy outdoor games and to contribute some of their pocket money to the journal's lifeboat fund which purchased the first Southend Lifeboat in 1879 (Brett named the vessel after the magazine and himself). Later that year he signed the adventure novelist Captain Thomas Mayne Reid as a regular contributor following his bankruptcy. In 1868 Brett targeted a slightly older readership with Young Men of Great Britain, a 'healthy, moral, instructive and amusing companion for every age', which lasted four years. In the 1870s Brett expanded into popular romantic fiction with titles such as Wedding Bells (1870–79), Something to Read (1881–99), English Ladies' Novelettes (1891–2) and Princesses' Novelettes (1893-1904).

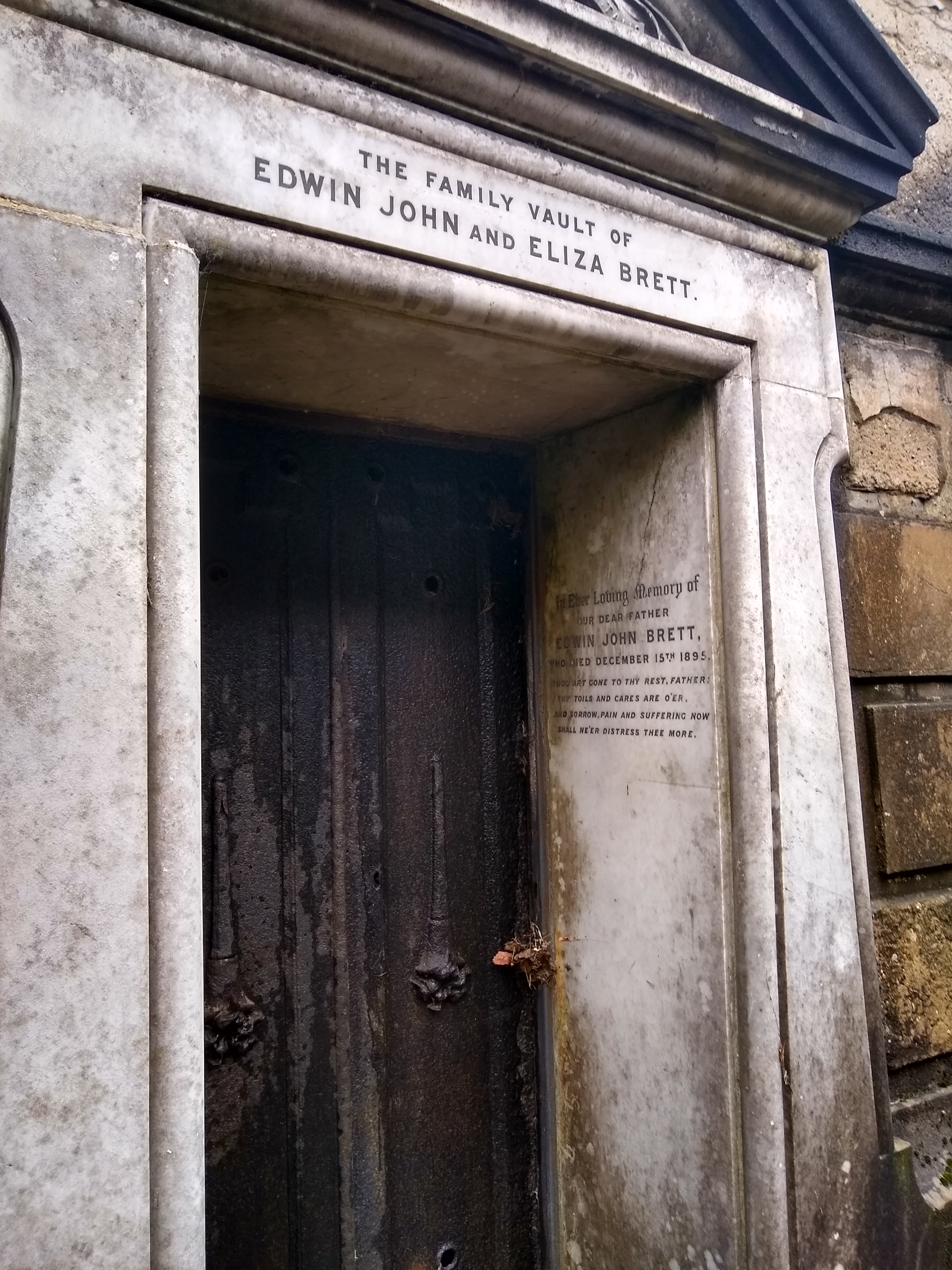
Vault of Edwin John Brett in the Circle of Lebanon at Highgate Cemetery

== Personal life ==
On 4 January 1849 he married Eliza (1832–1893), daughter of Henry Archer, a Clerkenwell butcher and they divided their time between two residences, Burleigh House, at 342 Camden Road, and Oaklands, on the Isle of Thanet. Financial success allowed him to indulge his passion for arms and armour, and over thirty years he acquired nearly a thousand items of militaria. Following the death of his wife on 30 May 1893, he devoted his time to his collection, publishing a lavishly illustrated catalogue in 1894 entitled Ancient Arms and Armour, collected and described by Edwin J Brett, which formed the basis of the Christie's catalogue when he sold most of the collection at auction on 18 March 1895 for £11,773.

Bonhams sold a portrait of Brett at auction on 26th Nov 2014, along with a copy of Brett's illustrated Ancient Arms and Armour.

After a long illness Brett died at Burleigh House on 15 December 1895, leaving an estate worth £76,538 to his nine children. The majority of his publishing empire was left to his eldest sons, Edwin Charles and Edgar Percy, who continued to manage its titles until the business collapsed in 1909.

Brett was buried in the family vault in Highgate cemetery on 19 December 1895.
