= The Englishwoman's Domestic Magazine =

Defunct British magazine

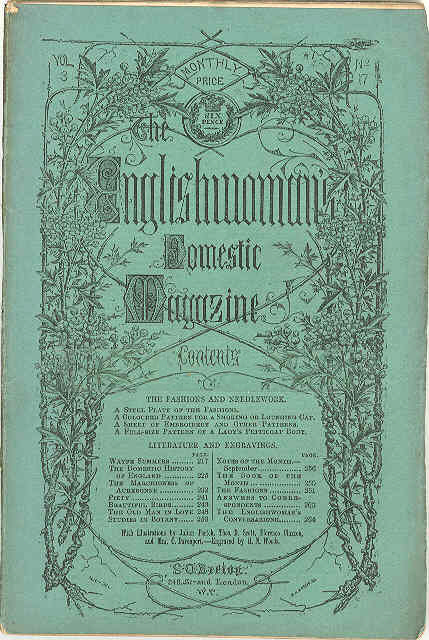
The Englishwoman's Domestic Magazine, title page, September 1861

The Englishwoman's Domestic Magazine (EDM) was a monthly magazine which was published between 1852 and 1879. Initially, the periodical was jointly edited by Isabella Mary Beeton and her husband Samuel Orchart Beeton, with Isabella contributing to sections on domestic management, fashion, embroidery and translations of French novels. Some of her contributions were later collected to form her widely acclaimed Book of Household Management. The editors sought to inform as well as entertain their readers; providing the advice of an 'encouraging friend' and 'cultivation of the mind' alongside serialised fiction, short stories and poetry. More unusually, it also featured patterns for dressmaking.

Originally priced at 2d, the periodical was a relatively cheap option for young, middle-class women. In 1860, however, following the Paper Tax abolition, the Beeton's decided to take the publication in a slightly different direction; opting to relaunch in a larger format and include high quality coloured plates. Subsequently, the price of the magazine rose to 6d.

In 1865, following the death of Isabella Beeton, the magazine was co-edited by her friend, Matilda Brown.

In 1867, Beeton expanded the existing correspondence section of the magazine. The contents of this "Conversazione", now included contributions by men, included material extolling the attractions of corsetry/tight-lacing, cross-dressing and flagellation; extracts on the latter were republished in pornographic compilations such as The Birchen Bouquet.

== Social importance ==
Through their correspondence columns and the subjects of their serialised fiction, The Englishwoman's Domestic Magazine provided a platform for middle-class women to express and confront the anxieties of femininity and domesticity. It was also a valuable resource for fashion, being 'the first English serial to make dress patterns and the latest fashions available to a mass audience'.

The magazine was considered an essential tool for any Victorian woman looking to fit into society and keep up with the times, especially in terms of fashion. Beeton later published other journals, some specifically on Victorian fashion. Le Moniteur de la Mode and The Queen appeared in 1861. They emphasized what was already featured in the EDM. The magazine was a way for readers to write in and explain their own lives and problem remedies. It could be used as an encyclopedia, a correspondence between readers, and a place for women to share their thoughts on everyday issues.

== Corsets ==
Corsets and tight-lacing were extensively explored by EDM. Tight-lacing was used as a way to enhance a women's figure, as it gradually added pressure on her waist to make it smaller over time. EDM had a correspondence column called, “The Corset Correspondence”. Two columns “Cupids Letter-Bag” and “Englishwoman’s Conversazione” were later combined into “The Conversazione””. The editors “decided to create some detached volumes about the themes due to the profit that this topic brought in. The Corset and the Crinoline (later republished as The Freaks of Fashion) and a History of the Rod”.

The mental and physical problems that corseting girls could cause was a frequent discussion point. The EDM has been used uncritically as evidence of tight-lacing during the period before the rise of dress history as a discipline with better resource in archives. An example is Robert's 1977 book which takes the correspondence at face value: "In 1867 an innocent letter from a mother worried about the use of corsets in her daughter’s school sparked a long discussion, in which the connection between tight-lacing, torture and pleasure was made explicit. Right when the "corset correspondence" ended, a more sadistic subject rose, concerning the habit of whipping to control female servants and girls." Furthermore, "a letter, which started the long discussion of tight-lacing, came from a mother complaining that she had left her "merry, romping girl" in a "large and fashionable boarding school near London" when she went abroad. On her return four years later she saw a "tall pale young lady glide slowly in with measured gait and languidly embrace me"; her absurdly small waist explained her change in demeanor."

== Sources ==
- The Englishwoman's Domestic Magazine, 1852-1879. Curated chronological listing of open-access copies of The Englishwoman's Domestic Magazine, including those available at Google Books, the HathiTrust, and the Internet Archive.
- Marcus, Sharon (2007). Between Women Friendship, Desire, and Marriage in Victorian England. ISBN 9780691128351. OCLC 1020172224.
