= British boys' magazines =

Magazines intended for boys

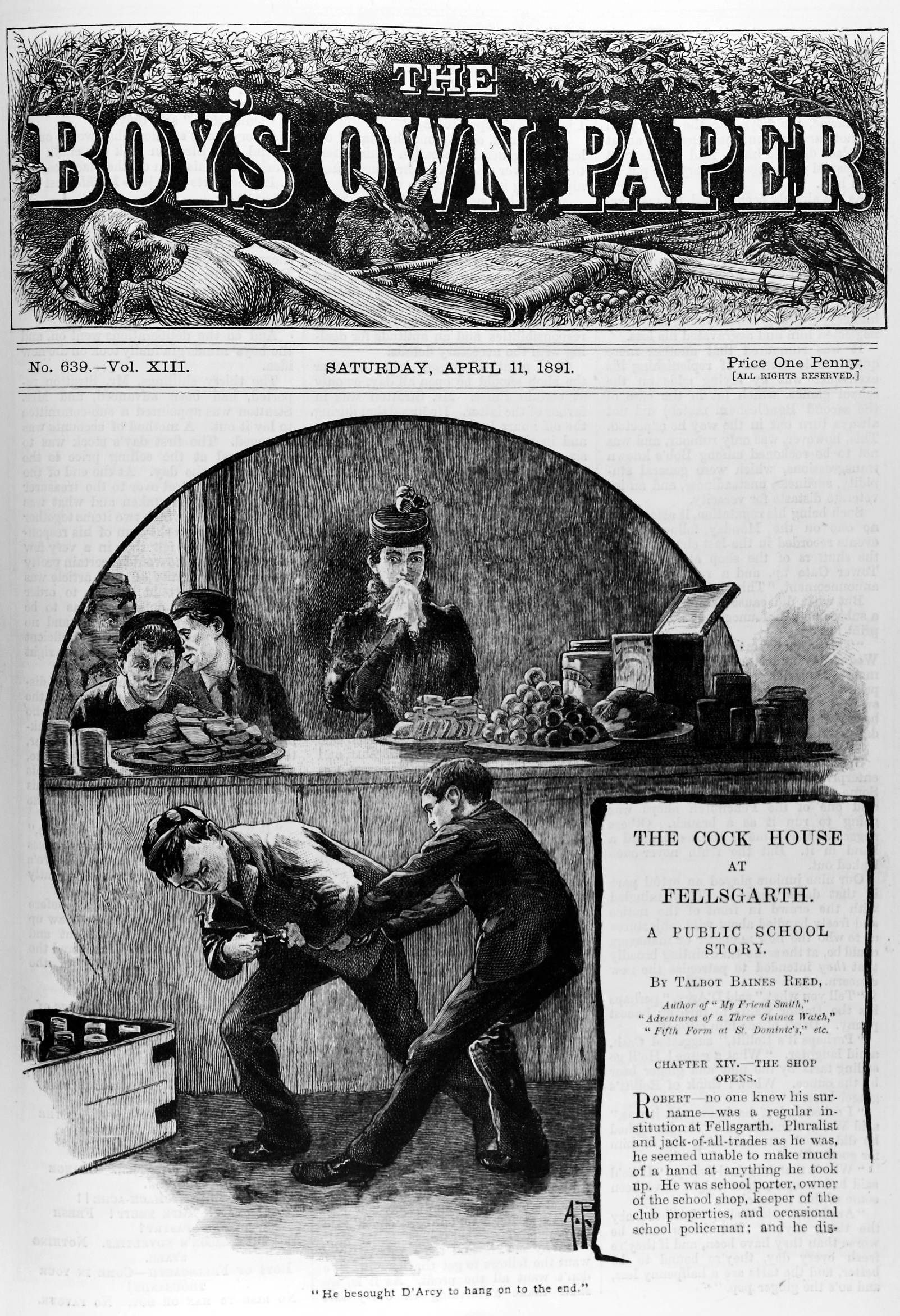
The Boy's Own Paper, front page, 11 April 1891

Magazines intended for boys fall into one of three classifications. These are comics which tell the story by means of strip cartoons; story papers which have several short stories; and pulp magazines which have a single, but complete, novella in them. The latter were not for the younger child and were often detective or western in content and were generally greater in cost. Several titles were published monthly whereas the other two categories were more frequent.

== History ==
=== Early 19th-century boys' literature ===
In 1828 in London, and in 1829 in Boston, an encyclopedia for boys by William Clarke was published, titled The Boy's Own Book: A Complete Encyclopedia of all the Diversions, Athletic, Scientific, and Recreative, of Boyhood and Youth. According to sports historian Robert William Henderson, "It was a tremendous contrast to the juvenile books of the period, which emphasized piety, morals and instruction of mind and soul; it must have been received with whoops of delight by the youngsters of both countries." The encyclopedia was frequently updated and reprinted through the end of the century.

=== Victorian period ===
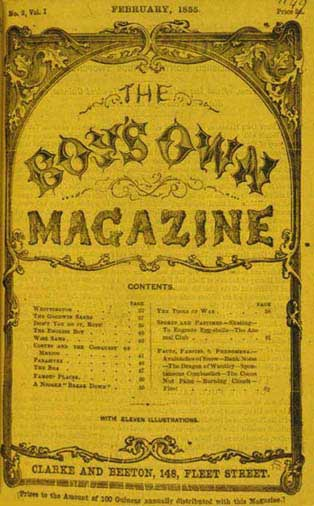
Beeton's Boy's Own Magazine, published in the UK from 1855 to 1890, was the first and most influential boys' magazine.

With the growth of education in the later part of the 19th century (universal education started in England in 1871), demand was growing for reading material aimed at the juvenile market. The first known edition of what would later become known as a "story paper" had been the unsuccessful monthly Young Gentleman's Magazine, published in 1777 and discontinued after six editions. The first story paper to make an impact was The Boys' and Girls' Penny Magazine, first published in September 1832.

The first successful serial publication aimed at boys alone, and one of the most influential, was Samuel Beeton's weekly Boy's Own Magazine, published from 1855 to 1890. Between 1855 and 1920, over a dozen weekly serials by various publishers were created with the copycat title Boys' Own.

Other story papers begun midcentury included Every Boy's Magazine in 1862, edited by Edmund Routledge, in 1862 (Note: In January 1862 the first number of Every Boy's Magazine was advertised as to appear "on Wednesday, the 22d instant" (The Observer, 12 January 1862, p. 1); and in the same Sunday newspaper two weeks later (26 January, p. 1), as "Just published, price 6d., No. 1 of an entirely new Illustrated Serial, containing 64 pages ...". Later newspaper coverage shows issue No. 12 published in December, and issue No. 13 in January as "the February issue" or "for February". It's possible that numbers 1 to 12 are dated February 1862 to January 1863 in retrospect. In December 1864, number 24 is promoted as the first of the new volume (1865).) and Boys of England in 1866. Numerous competitors quickly followed, including Boy’s Leisure Hour, Boys Standard, Young Men of Great Britain, etc. As the price and quality of fiction was the same, many of these storypapers also fell under the general definition of penny dreadfuls (also known as "penny bloods" or "blood and thunders" in their early days).

Few of these publications lasted more than a few years. Some did last; The Boy's Own Paper was published from 1879 to 1967 and The Boys' Friend from 1895 to 1927.

Another magazine with a comparatively long life was Chums, which started in 1892 and survived until 1941. It had stories about animals and sports as well as many about young people. In 1908 Chums sought to gain Baden Powell's support, and create its own brand of Scouts supporting the Chums paper. Baden-Powell was committed by contract to support the Pearson periodical The Scout, and gave no support to Chums, which became derisive about the Boy Scouts. In 1909 however it became the official journal for the British Boy Scouts, a break-away group from Baden Powell's Scout movement. (Note: The change came about due to the fact that the editor's own boys had joined the British Boy Scouts - see Edition 28 July 1909, page 916. Details from a MS History of the British Boy Scouts - Dr Michael Foster, held in the BBS Archives, Tarrant Hinton Rectory.)

=== Early 20th century ===
As the youth market established itself as an important part of the publishing industry, demand was perceived to exist for fiction which featured boys themselves in a leading role. This demand was to be met by stories about the public schools, a world where adults could be relegated to the background and where youths could be presented as having a degree of independence not possible elsewhere.

The publisher who took the lead in this period was Trapp Holmes with magazines such as Smiles, Funny Cuts and Vanguard. This last paper was a short lived paper, published from 1907 to 1909 and was a pioneer of the school stories genre.

Amalgamated Press soon entered the market in started to two of the most famous boys' papers, The Gem and The Magnet. The main writer for both was Charles Hamilton who was to be an important figure in schools fiction until his death in 1961.

=== Inter-war period ===
In between the two world wars there appeared in Britain a number of weekly magazines or papers aimed at boys between the ages of 8 and 16. Their price was 2d (two pence) and they were consequently known as the "tuppenny bloods". They were printed on newsprint, with a coloured front cover. Inside there were short stories, with illustrations and often in a serial form. Some factual articles were included. They were published by DC Thomson and known as the "Big Five."

Meanwhile, The Magnet and Gem continued to publish school stories, along with newcomers like Nelson Lee and spinoffs such as The Schoolboy's Own Library which reprinted earlier stories. Such papers, however, were continually losing circulation.

During the same period, comics publications like Amalgamated Press' Comic Cuts and Illustrated Chips, (Note: Comic Cuts and Illustrated Chips were both launched in 1890.) along with DC Thomson's The Dandy and The Beano, started to appear.

One boys' magazine that did not conform to the above formats was Modern Wonder, published by Odhams. It had a comparatively short life, starting in 1937 and closing down in 1941. It differed from the other magazines by mainly having factual articles of a technical nature, instead of all fiction. Some short stories and a serial were included, but it was largely well-illustrated articles about modern inventions.

=== Post-war period ===
Several new boys' comics were started in the 1950s, Tiger and Eagle being long-lasting. The characters in the strip of these two comics were mainly human, unlike those in The Beano and The Dandy. The Eagle had strips such as Dan Dare and PC 49 drawn without distortion.

By the middle of the 1960s, the taste of the youth of Britain was changing. Television had, for many, displaced reading. The improvement of public libraries also hastened the end of some magazines. As various publications stopped publication, they were sometimes merged with one of the remaining magazines. By 1970 most of the publications with text had been replaced by new weeklies of the strip cartoon type. Previously, this type of boys' magazine had largely only been available in the United Kingdom as imports from North America. Cartoon-strip novels for adults were also introduced.

By the end of the 20th century, many of these magazines had become collector's items. From being worthless paper, copies became highly desirable with high prices attached to them.

== Selected publications ==
=== Story papers ===
- Adventure
- Aldine Adventure Library
- The Boys' Friend (1895–1927)
- Boys' Fun
- The Boys' Herald (1903–1913)
- Boys' Journal
- The Boys' Leisure Hour
- Boys' Magazine
- Boys of the Empire
- Boys of England (1866–1899)
- The Boy’s Own Magazine (1855–1890)
- The Boy's Own Paper (1879–1967)
- The Boys' Realm (1902–1916; 1919–1929)
- The Bullseye
- The Champion (1922–1955)
- Chums (1892–1934)
- Detective Weekly (1933–1940)
- Every Boy’s Magazine (from 1862)
- The Gem (1907–1940)
- The Greyfriars Herald
- Halfpenny Marvel (1893–1922)
- The Magnet (1908–1940)
- The Marvel
- The Modern Boy (1928–1939)
- Nelson Lee Library
- Oracle
- The (Penny) Popular
- Pluck (1894–1916; 1922–1924)
- Schoolboys' Own Library
- The Skipper
- The Thriller (1929–1937)
- The Triumph
- Union Jack
- The Vanguard (1907–1909)
- Young Britain
- The Young Englishman
- The Wizard (1922–1963)

=== The Big Five (Tuppenny Bloods) ===
- Thomson's Adventure (1921–1961)
- Thomson's Hotspur (1933–1959) – Red Circle School stories
- Thomson's Rover (1922–1961)
- Thomson's Skipper (1930–1941)
- Thomson's Wizard (1922–1963)

=== Comics ===
- Thomson's The Beano (1938–present) – strip comic
- The Champion (1939–45 at least; 1922 to 1955 probably)
- Thomson's The Dandy (1937–2012) – strip comic
- Eagle (1950–1994, with a gap) – strip comic
- Tiger (1954–1985) – strip comic

=== Other ===
- Modern Wonder; later Modern World (1937 to 1941)

== See also ==
- Boys' Own
- Penny dreadful
- British comics
- "Boys' Weeklies" – essay by George Orwell
- Shounen manga

== Other sources ==
- "Wartime Scrapbook on the Home Front 1939 to 1945" by Robert Opie - published by piglobal ISBN 0-9547954-4-X
- "The 30s Scrapbook" by Robert Opie - published by piglobal ISBN 1-872727-33-6
- Richards, Jeffery (1991), Happiest Days: Public Schools in English Fiction, Manchester: Manchester University Press.
- Turner, E.S. (1975), Boys will be Boys – 3rd edition, London: Penguin.
