= Isabella Beeton =

English journalist, publisher and writer (1836–1865)

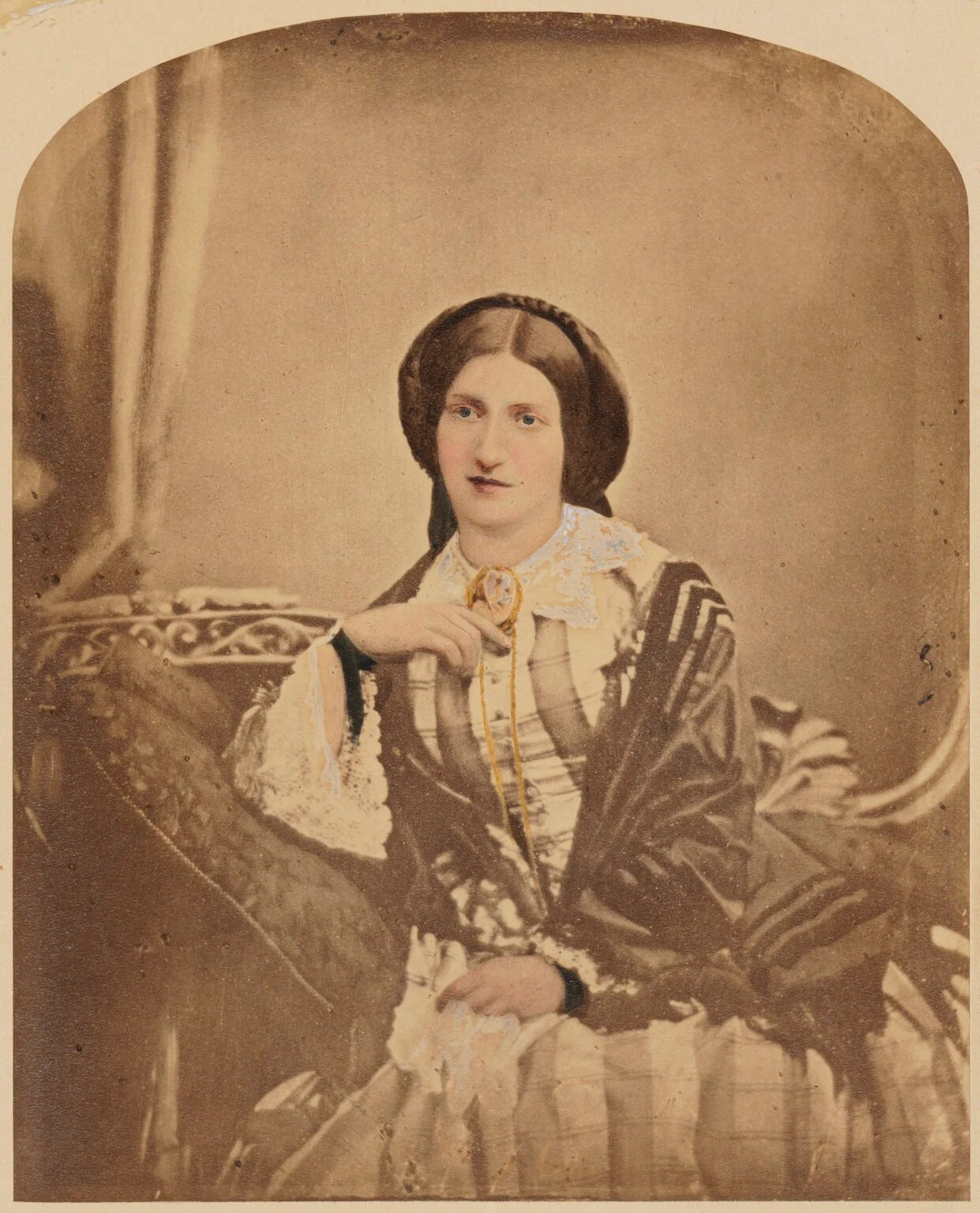
- Beeton photographed c. 1854
- Born: Isabella Mary Mayson; 14 March 1836; Marylebone, London, England
- Died: 6 February 1865 (aged 28); Swanscombe, Kent, England
- Occupations: Journalist; editor; writer
- Known for: Mrs. Beeton's Book of Household Management (1861)
- Spouse: Samuel Orchart Beeton

Isabella Mary Beeton (née Mayson; 14 March 1836 – 6 February 1865), known as Mrs Beeton, was an English journalist, editor and writer. Her name is particularly associated with her first book, the 1861 work Mrs. Beeton's Book of Household Management. She was born in London and, after schooling in Islington, north London, and Heidelberg, Germany, she married Samuel Orchart Beeton, an ambitious publisher and magazine editor.

In 1857, less than a year after the wedding, Beeton began writing for one of her husband's publications, The Englishwoman's Domestic Magazine. She translated French fiction and wrote the cookery column, though all the recipes were plagiarised from other works or sent in by the magazine's readers. In 1859 the Beetons launched a series of 48-page monthly supplements to The Englishwoman's Domestic Magazine; the 24 instalments were published in one volume as Mrs Beeton's Book of Household Management in October 1861, which sold 60,000 copies in the first year. Beeton was working on an abridged version of her book, which was to be titled The Dictionary of Every-Day Cookery, when she died of puerperal fever in February 1865 at the age of 28. She gave birth to four children, two of whom died in infancy, and had several miscarriages. Two of her biographers, Nancy Spain and Kathryn Hughes, posit the theory that Samuel had unknowingly contracted syphilis in a premarital liaison with a prostitute, and had unwittingly passed the disease on to his wife.

The Book of Household Management has been edited, revised and enlarged several times since Beeton's death and is still in print as at 2016. Food writers have stated that the subsequent editions of the work were far removed from and inferior to the original version. Several cookery writers, including Elizabeth David and Clarissa Dickson Wright, have criticised Beeton's work, particularly her use of other people's recipes. Others, such as the food writer Bee Wilson, consider the censure overstated, and that Beeton and her work should be thought extraordinary and admirable. Her name has become associated with knowledge and authority on Victorian cooking and home management, and the Oxford English Dictionary states that by 1891 the term Mrs Beeton had become used as a generic name for a domestic authority. She is also considered a strong influence in the building or shaping of a middle-class identity of the Victorian era.

== Biography ==
=== Early life, 1836–1854 ===
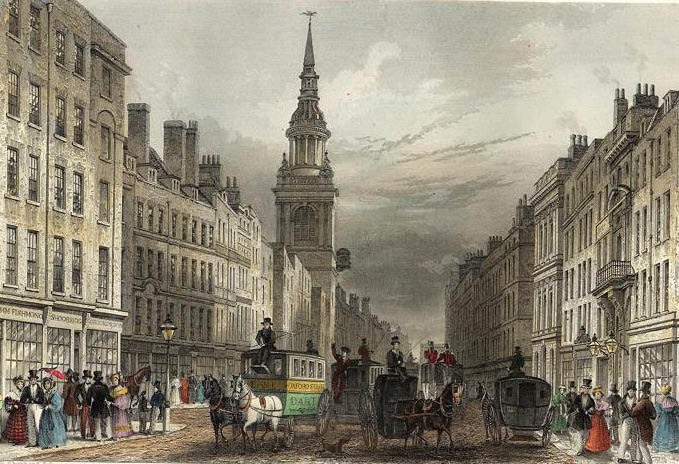
Cheapside, London, where Isabella and her family moved in 1836

Isabella Mayson was born on 14 March 1836 in Marylebone, London. She was the eldest of three daughters to Benjamin Mayson, a linen factor (merchant) (Note: Beeton's biographer, Kathryn Hughes, opines that Benjamin, "a vicar's son ... though not quite a gentleman, was established in a gentlemanly line of business".) and his wife Elizabeth (née Jerrom). Shortly after Isabella's birth the family moved to Milk Street, Cheapside, from where Benjamin traded. (Note: Although several biographies state Beeton was at Milk Lane, Hughes considers this as part of the "legend" that surrounds Beeton; birth at the address in the City of London would have been within the sound of the bells of St Mary-le-Bow church, which would make her a cockney.) He died when Isabella was four years old, (Note: The cause of death was given as "apoplexy" which, Hughes notes, was the term used to cover a range of ailments including alcoholism, syphilis, stroke and heart attack. The historian Sarah Freeman, in her biography of Beeton, considers that the cause of death was "probably fever, perhaps cholera".) and Elizabeth, pregnant and unable to cope with raising the children on her own while maintaining Benjamin's business, sent her two elder daughters to live with relatives. Isabella went to live with her recently widowed paternal grandfather in Great Orton, Cumberland, though she was back with her mother within the next two years.

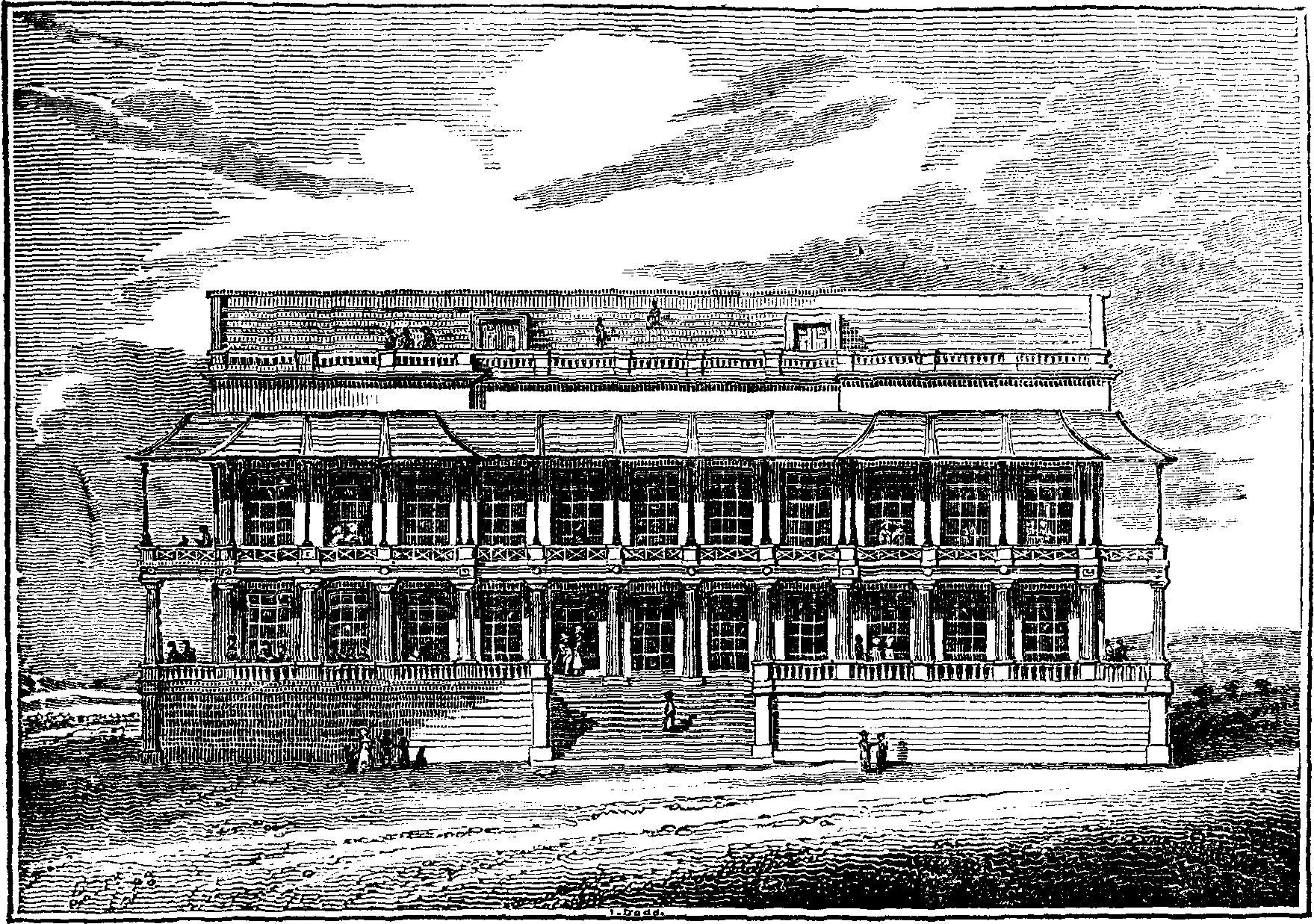
The new race stand at Epsom Racecourse in 1829

Three years after Benjamin's death Elizabeth married Henry Dorling, a widower with four children. Henry was the Clerk of Epsom Racecourse, and had been granted residence within the racecourse grounds. The family, including Elizabeth's mother, moved to Surrey and over the next twenty years Henry and Elizabeth had a further thirteen children. Isabella was instrumental in her siblings' upbringing, and collectively referred to them as a "living cargo of children". (Note: The couple's twelfth child, Alfred, was embarrassed about the number of children and sent his father a condom through the post as a practical joke. His father, unhappy with the implication—condoms tended to only be used by prostitutes' clients—sent his son away for an apprenticeship with the merchant navy.) The experience gave her much insight and experience in how to manage a family and its household.

After a brief education at a boarding school in Islington, in 1851 Isabella was sent to school in Heidelberg, Germany, accompanied by her stepsister Jane Dorling. Isabella became proficient in the piano and excelled in French and German; she also gained knowledge and experience in making pastry. (Note: The practice in middle class German households at the time was for the mistress of the house to make cakes and puddings herself, rather than instructing the household staff to undertake the task.) She had returned to Epsom by the summer of 1854 and took further lessons in pastry-making from a local baker.

=== Marriage and career, 1854–1861 ===
Around 1854 Isabella Mayson began a relationship with Samuel Orchart Beeton. His family had lived in Milk Street at the same time as the Maysons—Samuel's father still ran the Dolphin Tavern there—and Samuel's sisters had also attended the same Heidelberg school as Isabella. Samuel was the first British publisher of Harriet Beecher Stowe's Uncle Tom's Cabin in 1852 and had also released two innovative and pioneering journals: The Englishwoman's Domestic Magazine in 1852 and the Boys' Own magazine in 1855. The couple entered into extensive correspondence in 1855—in which Isabella signed her letters as "Fatty"—and they announced their engagement in June 1855. The marriage took place at St Martin's Church, Epsom, in July the following year, and was announced in The Times. Samuel was "a discreet but firm believer in the equality of women" and their relationship, both personal and professional, was an equal partnership. The couple went to Paris for a three-week honeymoon, after which Samuel's mother joined them in a visit to Heidelberg. They returned to Britain in August, when the newlyweds moved into 2 Chandos Villas, a large Italianate house in Pinner.

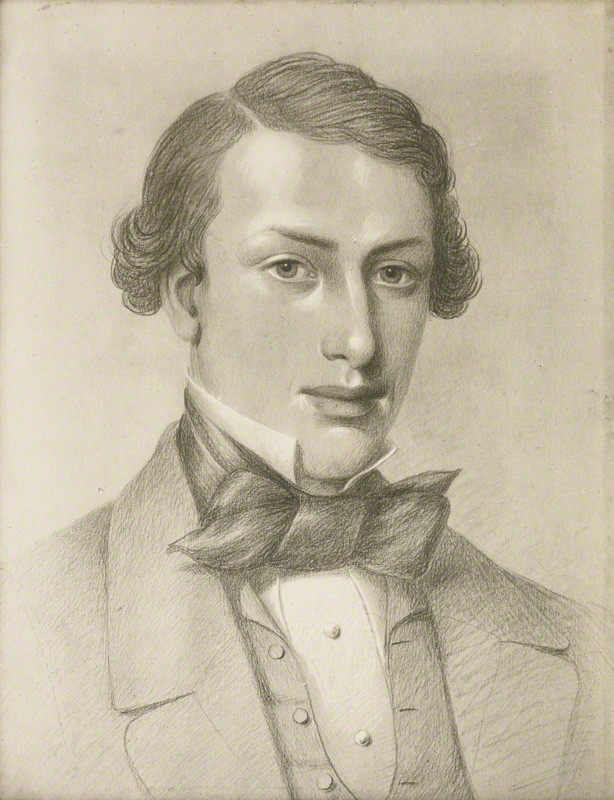
Samuel Orchart Beeton in 1860

Within a month of returning from their honeymoon Beeton was pregnant. A few weeks before the birth, Samuel persuaded his wife to contribute to The Englishwoman's Domestic Magazine, a publication that the food writers Mary Aylett and Olive Ordish consider was "designed to make women content with their lot inside the home, not to interest them in the world outside". The magazine was affordable, aimed at young middle class women and was commercially successful, selling 50,000 issues a month by 1856. Beeton began by translating French fiction for publication as stories or serials. Shortly afterwards she started to work on the cookery column—which had been moribund for the previous six months following the departure of the previous correspondent—and the household article. The Beetons' son, Samuel Orchart, was born towards the end of May 1857, but died at the end of August that year. On the death certificate, the cause of death was given as diarrhoea and cholera, although Hughes hypothesises that Samuel senior had unknowingly contracted syphilis in a premarital liaison with a prostitute, and had unwittingly passed the condition on to his wife, which would have infected his son.

While coping with the loss of her child, Beeton continued to work at The Englishwoman's Domestic Magazine. Although she was not a regular cook, she and Samuel obtained recipes from other sources. A request to receive the readers' own recipes led to over 2,000 being sent in, which were selected and edited by the Beetons. Published works were also copied, largely unattributed to any of the sources. These included Eliza Acton's Modern Cookery for Private Families, Elizabeth Raffald's The Experienced English Housekeeper, Marie-Antoine Carême's Le Pâtissier royal parisien, Louis Eustache Ude's The French Cook, Alexis Soyer's The Modern Housewife or, Ménagère and The Pantropheon, Hannah Glasse's The Art of Cookery Made Plain and Easy, Maria Rundell's A New System of Domestic Cookery, and the works of Charles Elmé Francatelli. Suzanne Daly and Ross G. Forman, in their examination of Victorian cooking culture, consider that the plagiarism makes it "an important index of mid-Victorian and middle-class society" because the production of the text from its own readers ensures that it is a reflection of what was actually being cooked and eaten at the time. In reproducing the recipes of others, Beeton was following the recommendation given to her by Henrietta English, a family friend, who wrote that "Cookery is a Science that is only learnt by Long Experience and years of study which of course you have not had. Therefore my advice would be compile a book from receipts from a Variety of the Best Books published on Cookery and Heaven knows there is a great variety for you to choose from."

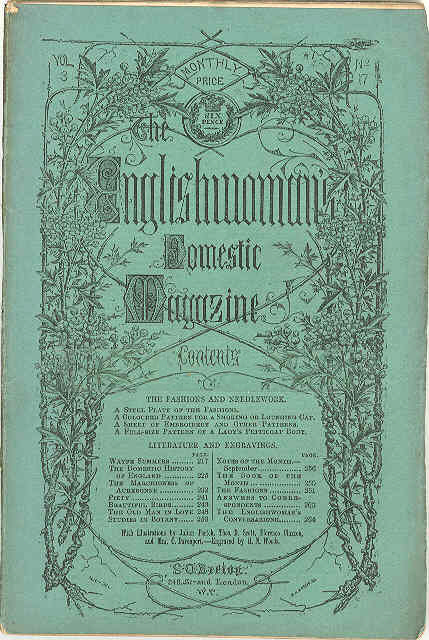
The Englishwoman's Domestic Magazine, September 1861

The Beetons partly followed the layout of Acton's recipes, although with a major alteration: whereas the earlier writer provided the method of cooking followed by a list of the required ingredients, the recipes in The Englishwoman's Domestic Magazine listed the components before the cooking process. Beeton 's standardised layout used for the recipes also showed the approximate costs of each serving, the seasonality of the ingredients and the number of portions per dish. According to the twentieth-century British cookery writer Elizabeth David, one of the strengths of Beeton's writing was in the "clarity and details of her general instructions, her brisk comments, her no-nonsense asides". Margaret Beetham, the historian, sees that one of the strengths of the book was the "consistent principle of organisation which made its heterogeneous contents look uniform and orderly", and brought a consistent style in presentation and layout. Whereas Daly and Forman consider such an approach as "nothing if not formulaic", Hughes sees it as "the thing most beloved by the mid Victorians, a system".

During the particularly bitter winter of 1858–59 Beeton prepared her own soup that she served to the poor of Pinner, "Soup for benevolent purposes"; (Note: The soup—which took six and a half hours to make at the cost of 1 1/2d. ("d" was a penny, 1/240 of a pound sterling) per quart—consisted of: "An ox-cheek, any pieces of trimmings of beef, which may be bought very cheaply (say 4 lbs.), a few bones, any pot-liquor the larder may furnish, 1/4 peck of onions, 6 leeks, a large bunch of herbs, 1/2 lb. of celery (the outside pieces, or green tops, do very well); 1/2 lb. of carrots, 1/2 lb. of turnips, 1/2 lb. of coarse brown sugar, 1/2 a pint of beer, 4 lbs. of common rice or pearl barley; 1/2 lb. of salt, 1 oz. of black pepper, a few raspings, 10 gallons of water.") her sister later recalled that Beeton "was busy making [the] soup for the poor, and the children used to call with their cans regularly to be refilled". The recipe would become the only entry in her Book of Household Management that was her own. After two years of miscarriages, the couple's second son was born in June 1859; he was also named Samuel Orchart Beeton. (Note: The writer Nancy Spain, in her biography of Beeton, put the month of birth as September, while Freeman puts the birth in the autumn.) Hughes sees the miscarriages as further evidence of Samuel's syphilis.

As early as 1857 the Beetons had considered using the magazine columns as the basis of a book of collected recipes and homecare advice, Hughes believes, and in November 1859 they launched a series of 48-page monthly supplements with The Englishwoman's Domestic Magazine. The print block for the whole series of the supplements was set from the beginning so the break between each edition was fixed at 48 pages, regardless of the text, and in several issues the text of a sentence or recipe is split between the end of one instalment and the beginning of the next.

The Beetons decided to revamp The Englishwoman's Domestic Magazine, particularly the fashion column, which the historian Graham Nown describes as "a rather drab piece". They travelled to Paris in March 1860 to meet Adolphe Goubaud, the publisher of the French magazine Le Moniteur de la Mode. The magazine carried a full-sized dress pattern outlined on a fold-out piece of paper for users to cut out and make their own dresses. The Beetons came to an agreement with Goubaud for the Frenchman to provide patterns and illustrations for their magazine. The first edition to carry the new feature appeared on 1 May, six weeks after the couple returned from Paris. For the redesigned magazine, Samuel was joined as editor by Isabella, who was described as "Editress". As well as being co-editors, the couple were also equal partners. Isabella brought an efficiency and strong business acumen to Samuel's normally disorganised and financially wasteful approach. She joined her husband at work, travelling daily by train to the office, where her presence caused a stir among commuters, most of whom were male. In June 1860 the Beetons travelled to Killarney, Ireland, for a fortnight's holiday, leaving their son at home with his nurse. They enjoyed the sightseeing, although on the days it rained, they stayed inside their hotel and worked on the next edition of The Englishwoman's Domestic Magazine. Beeton was impressed with the food they were served, and wrote in her diary that the dinners were "conducted in quite the French style".

In September 1861 the Beetons released a new, weekly publication called The Queen, the Ladies' Newspaper. (Note: After merging with Harper's magazine to become Harper's & Queen in 1970, the publication then became Harper's, before its current incarnation, Harper's Bazaar.) With the Beetons busy running their other titles, they employed Frederick Greenwood as the editor.

=== Mrs Beeton's Book of Household Management and later, 1861–1865 ===
I must frankly own, that if I had known, beforehand, that this book would have cost me the labour which it has, I should never have been courageous enough to commence it.

— Isabella Beeton, Preface of the Book of Household Management

The complete version of Mrs Beeton's Book of Household Management, consisting of the 24 collected monthly instalments, was published on 1 October 1861; (Note: The full title of the book was The Book of Household Management, comprising information for the Mistress, Housekeeper, Cook, Kitchen-Maid, Butler, Footman, Coachman, Valet, Upper and Under House-Maids, Lady's-Maid, Maid-of-all-Work, Laundry-Maid, Nurse and Nurse-Maid, Monthly Wet and Sick Nurses, etc. etc.—also Sanitary, Medical, & Legal Memoranda: with a History of the Origin, Properties, and Uses of all Things Connected with Home Life and Comfort.) it became one of the major publishing events of the nineteenth century. Beeton included an extensive 26-page "Analytical Index" in the book. Although not an innovation—it had been used in The Family Friend magazine since 1855—Hughes considers the index in the Book of Household Management to be "fabulously detailed and exhaustively cross-referenced". Of the 1,112 pages, over 900 contained recipes. The remainder provided advice on fashion, child care, animal husbandry, poisons, the management of servants, science, religion, first aid and the importance in the use of local and seasonal produce. In its first year of publication, the book sold 60,000 copies. It reflected Victorian values, particularly hard work, thrift and cleanliness. Christopher Clausen, in his study of the British middle classes, sees that Beeton "reflected better than anyone else, and for a larger audience, the optimistic message that mid-Victorian England was filled with opportunities for those who were willing to learn how to take advantage of them". The food writer Annette Hope thinks that "one can understand its success. If ... young ladies knew nothing of domestic arrangements, no better book than this could have been devised for them."

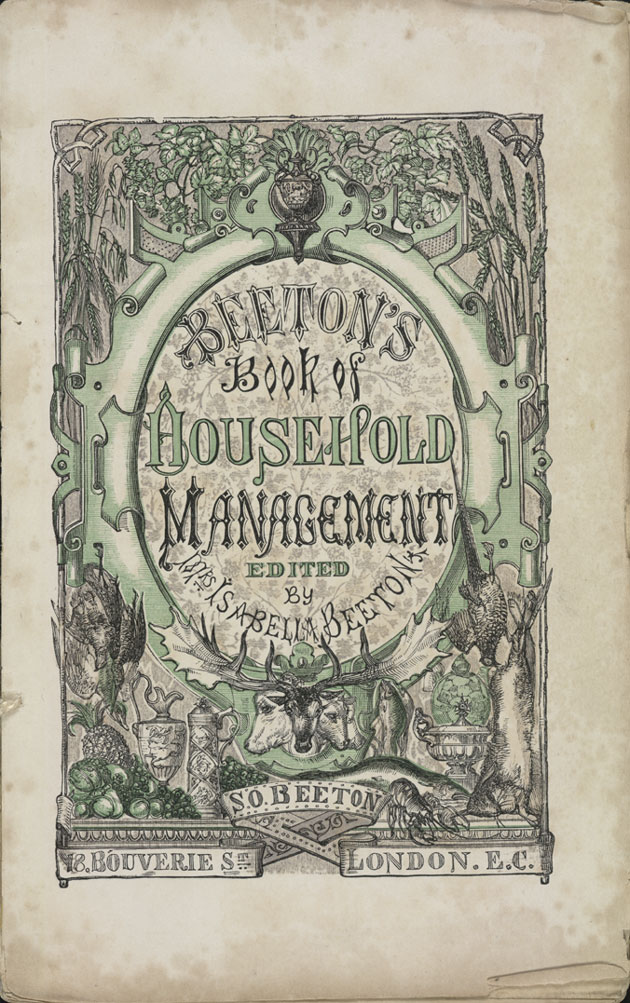
Title page of Mrs Beeton's Book of Household Management, published in 1861

The reviews for Book of Household Management were positive. The critic for the London Evening Standard considered that Beeton had earned herself a household reputation, remarking that she had "succeeded in producing a volume which will be, for years to come, a treasure to be made much of in every English household". The critic for the Saturday Review wrote that "for a really valuable repertory of hints on all sorts of household matters, we recommend Mrs Beeton with few misgivings". The anonymous reviewer for The Bradford Observer considered that "the information afforded ... appears intelligible and explicit"; the reviewer also praised the layout of the recipes, highlighting details relating to ingredients, seasonality and the times needed. Writing in The Morning Chronicle, an anonymous commentator opined that "Mrs Beeton has omitted nothing which tends to the comfort of housekeepers, or facilitates the many little troubles and cares that fall to the lot of every wife and mother. She may safely predict that this book will in future take precedence of every other on the same subject." For the 1906 edition of the book, The Illustrated London News's reviewer considered the work "a formidable body of domestic doctrine", and thought that "the book is almost of the first magnitude".

Samuel's business decisions from 1861 were unproductive and included an ill-advised investment in purchasing paper—in which he lost £1,000—and a court case over unpaid bills. His hubris in business affairs brought on financial difficulties and in early 1862 the couple had moved from their comfortable Pinner house to premises over their office. The air of central London was not conducive to the health of the Beetons' son, and he began to ail. Three days after Christmas his health worsened and he died on New Year's Eve 1862 at the age of three; his death certificate gave the cause as "suppressed scarlatina" and "laryngitis". (Note: Scarlatina is an archaic name for scarlet fever.) In March 1863 Beeton found that she was pregnant again, and in April the couple moved to a house in Greenhithe, Kent; their son, who they named Orchart, was born on New Year's Eve 1863. Although the couple had been through financial problems, they enjoyed relative prosperity during 1863, boosted by the sale of The Queen to Edward Cox in the middle of the year.

In the middle of 1864 the Beetons again visited the Goubauds in Paris—the couple's third visit to the city—and Beeton was pregnant during the visit, just as she had been the previous year. On her return to Britain she began working on an abridged version of the Book of Household Management , which was to be titled The Dictionary of Every-Day Cookery. On 29 January 1865, while working on the proofs of the dictionary, she went into labour; the baby—Mayson Moss—was born that day. (Note: Mayson became a journalist for the Daily Mail; he was knighted for his work at the Ministry of Munitions during the First World War. The Beetons' elder son, Orchart, went on to a career in the army; both died in 1947.) Beeton began to feel feverish the following day and died of puerperal fever on 6 February at the age of 28.

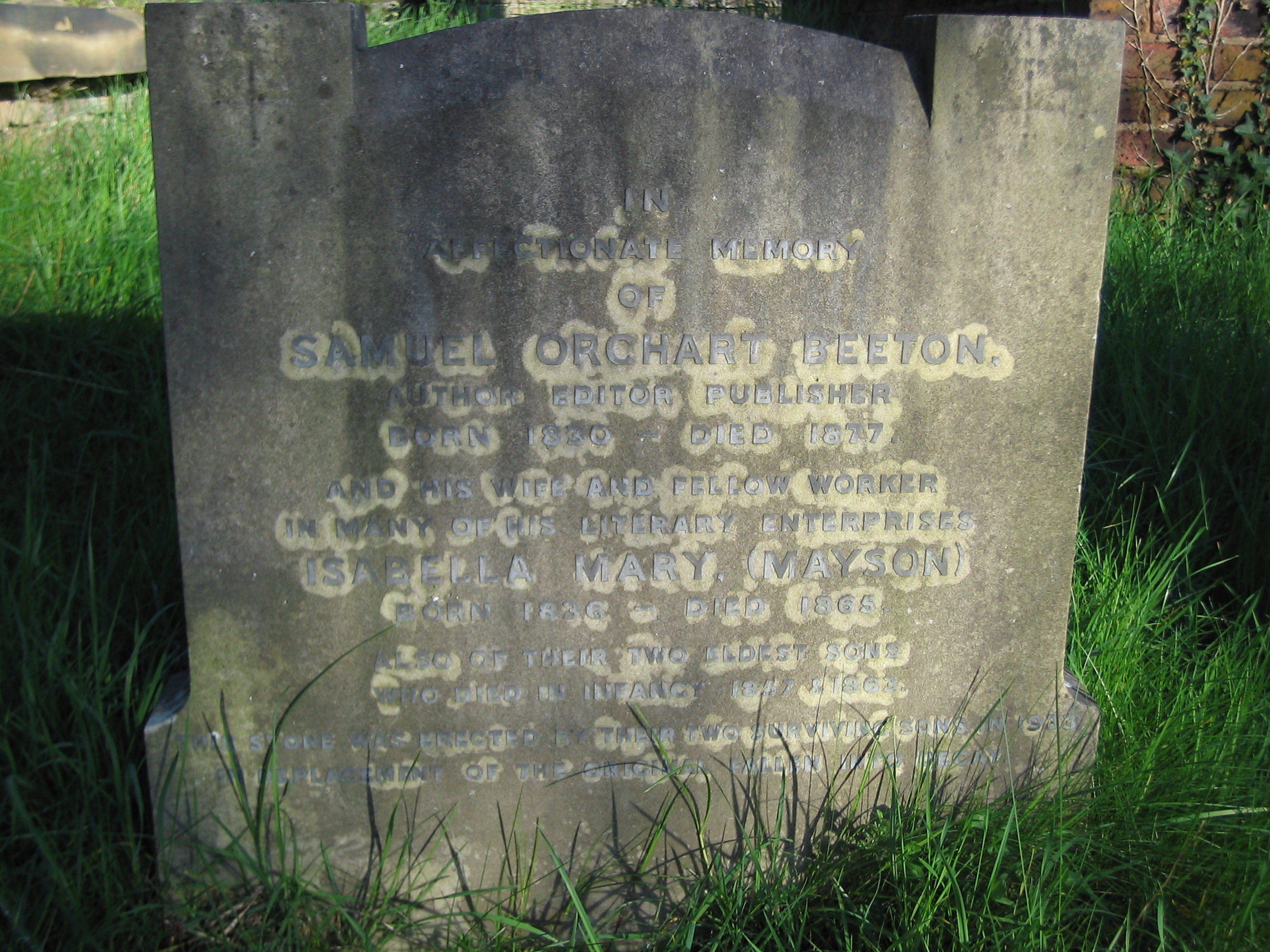
Gravestone of Samuel and Isabella, West Norwood Cemetery

Beeton was buried at West Norwood Cemetery on 11 February. (Note: When Samuel died in 1877, at the age of 46, he was buried alongside his wife.) When The Dictionary of Every-Day Cookery was published in the same year, Samuel added a tribute to his wife at the end:

Her works speak for themselves; and, although taken from this world in the very height and strength, and in the early days of womanhood, she felt satisfaction—so great to all who strive with good intent and warm will—of knowing herself regarded with respect and gratitude.

— Samuel Beeton, The Dictionary of Every-Day Cookery

== Legacy ==
In May 1866, following a severe downturn in his financial fortunes, Samuel sold the rights to the Book of Household Management to Ward, Lock and Tyler (later Ward Lock & Co). The writer Nancy Spain, in her biography of Isabella, reports that, given the money the company made from the Beetons' work, "surely no man ever made a worse or more impractical bargain" than Samuel did. In subsequent publications Ward Lock suppressed the details of the lives of the Beetons—especially the death of Isabella—in order to protect their investment by letting readers think she was still alive and creating recipes—what Hughes considers to be "intentional censorship". Those later editions continued to make the connection to Beeton in what Beetham considers to be a "fairly ruthless marketing policy which was begun by Beeton but carried on vigorously by Ward, Lock, and Tyler". Those subsequent volumes bearing Beeton's name became less reflective of the original. Since its initial publication the Book of Household Management has been issued in numerous hardback and paperback editions, translated into several languages and has never been out of print.

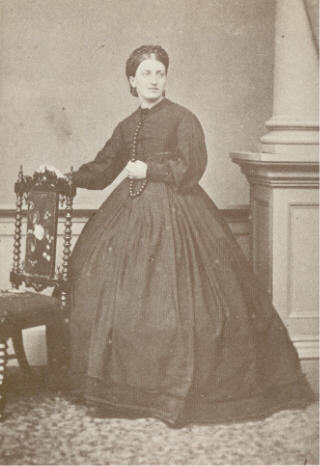
Isabella in 1860

Beeton and her main work have been subjected to criticism over the course of the twentieth century. Elizabeth David complains of recipes that are "sometimes slapdash and misleading", although she acknowledges that Prosper Montagné's Larousse Gastronomique also contains errors. The television cook Delia Smith admits she was puzzled "how on earth Mrs Beeton's book managed to utterly eclipse ... [Acton's] superior work", while her fellow chef, Clarissa Dickson Wright, opines that "It would be unfair to blame any one person or one book for the decline of English cookery, but Isabella Beeton and her ubiquitous book do have a lot to answer for." In comparison, the food writer Bee Wilson opines that disparaging Beeton's work was only a "fashionable" stance to take and that the cook's writing "simply makes you want to cook". Christopher Driver, the journalist and food critic, suggests that the "relative stagnation and want of refinement in the indigenous cooking of Britain between 1880 and 1930" may instead be explained by the "progressive debasement under successive editors, revises and enlargers". David comments that "when plain English cooks" were active in their kitchens, "they followed plain English recipes and chiefly those from the Mrs Beeton books or their derivatives". Dickson Wright considers Beeton to be a "fascinating source of information" from a social history viewpoint, and Aylett and Ordish consider the work to be "the best and most reliable guide for the scholar to the domestic history of the mid-Victorian era".

Despite the criticism, Clausen observes that "'Mrs. Beeton' has ... been for over a century the standard English cookbook, frequently outselling every other book but the Bible". According to the Oxford English Dictionary, the term Mrs Beeton became used as a generic name for "an authority on cooking and domestic subjects" as early as 1891, and Beetham opines that "'Mrs. Beeton' became a trade mark, a brand name". In a review by Gavin Koh published in a 2009 issue of The BMJ, Mrs Beeton's Book of Household Management was labelled a medical classic. In Beeton's "attempt to educate the average reader about common medical complaints and their management", Koh argues, "she preceded the family health guides of today". Robin Wensley, a professor of strategic management, believes that Beeton's advice and guidance on household management can also be applied to business management, and her lessons on the subject have stood the test of time better than some of her advice on cooking or etiquette.

Following the radio broadcast of Meet Mrs. Beeton, a 1934 comedy in which Samuel was portrayed in an unflattering light, (Note: Meet Mrs. Beeton, written by L. du Garde Peach, was broadcast on 4 January 1934 on the BBC National Programme; Joyce Carey played Isabella and George Sanders played Samuel.) and Mrs Beeton, a 1937 documentary, (Note: Mrs. Beeton, written by Joan Adeney Easdale, was broadcast on 9 November 1937 on the BBC Regional Programme.) Mayson Beeton worked with H. Montgomery Hyde to produce the biography Mr and Mrs Beeton, although completion and publication were delayed until 1951. In the meantime Nancy Spain published Mrs Beeton and her Husband in 1948, updated and retitled in 1956 to The Beeton Story. In the new edition Spain hinted at, but did not elucidate upon, on the possibility that Samuel contracted syphilis. Several other biographies followed, including from the historian Sarah Freeman, who wrote Isabella and Sam in 1977; Nown's Mrs Beeton: 150 Years of Cookery and Household Management, published on the 150th anniversary of Beeton's birthday, and Hughes's The Short Life and Long Times of Mrs Beeton, published in 2006. Beeton was ignored by the Dictionary of National Biography for many years: while Acton was included in the first published volume of 1885, Beeton did not have an entry until 1993.

There have been several television broadcasts about Beeton. In 1970 Margaret Tyzack portrayed her in a solo performance written by Rosemary Hill, in 2006 Anna Madeley played Beeton in a docudrama, and Sophie Dahl presented a documentary, The Marvellous Mrs Beeton, in 2011.

The literary historian Kate Thomas sees Beeton as "a powerful force in the making of middle-class Victorian domesticity", while the Oxford University Press, advertising an abridged edition of the Book of Household Management, considers Beeton's work a "founding text" and "a force in shaping" the middle-class identity of the Victorian era. Within that identity, the historian Sarah Richardson sees that one of Beeton's achievements was the integration of different threads of domestic science into one volume, which "elevat[ed] the middle-class female housekeeper's role ... placing it in a broader and more public context". Nown quotes an unnamed academic who thought that "Mrs Beetonism has preserved the family as a social unit, and made social reforms a possibility", while Nicola Humble, in her history of British food, sees The Book of Household Management as "an engine for social change" which led to a "new cult of domesticity that was to play such a major role in mid-Victorian life". Nown considers Beeton

... a singular and remarkable woman, praised in her lifetime and later forgotten and ignored when a pride in light pastry ... were no longer considered prerequisites for womanhood. Yet in her lively, progressive way, she helped many women to overcome the loneliness of marriage and gave the family the importance it deserved. In the climate of her time she was brave, strong-minded and a tireless champion of her sisters everywhere.

== Notes and references ==
=== Sources ===
- Allen, Rob; van den Berg, Thijs (2014). Serialization in Popular Culture. New York and Abingdon, Oxon: Routledge. ISBN 978-1-134-49205-3.
- Aylett, Mary; Ordish, Olive (1965). First Catch Your Hare. London: Macdonald. OCLC 54053.
- Beetham, Margaret (2003). A Magazine of Her Own?: Domesticity and Desire in the Woman's Magazine, 1800–1914. London and New York: Routledge. ISBN 978-1-134-76878-3.
- Beetham, Margaret (2004). "Beeton, Samuel Orchart (1831–1877)". Oxford Dictionary of National Biography (online ed.). Oxford University Press. doi:10.1093/ref:odnb/45481. (Subscription, Wikipedia Library access or UK public library membership required.)
- Beetham, Margaret (2012). "Beeton, Isabella Mary (1836–1865)". Oxford Dictionary of National Biography (online ed.). Oxford University Press. doi:10.1093/ref:odnb/37172. (Subscription, Wikipedia Library access or UK public library membership required.)
- Beeton, Isabella (1861). The Book of Household Management. London: S.O. Beeton. OCLC 8586799.
- Beeton, Isabella (1865). Mrs Beeton's Dictionary of Every-day Cookery. London: S.O. Beeton. OCLC 681270556.
- Cox, Howard; Mowatt, Simon (2014). Revolutions from Grub Street: A History of Magazine Publishing in Britain. Oxford: Oxford University Press. ISBN 978-0-19-960163-9.
- David, Elizabeth (1961). An Omelette and a Glass of Wine. New York, NY: Lyons & Burford. ISBN 978-1-55821-571-9.
- Dickson Wright, Clarissa (2011). A History of English Food. London: Random House. ISBN 978-1-905211-85-2.
- Driver, Christopher (1983). The British at Table 1940–1980. London: Chatto & Windus. ISBN 978-0-7011-2582-0.
- Forster-Walmsley, J.K. (2013). Breaking the Mould (Kindle ed.). Amazon Media. ISBN 978-1-291-95255-1.
- Freeman, Sarah (1977). Isabella and Sam: The Story of Mrs. Beeton. London: Victor Gollancz Ltd. ISBN 978-0-575-01835-8.
- Freeman, Sarah (1989). Mutton and Oysters: The Victorians and Their Food. London: Gollancz. ISBN 978-0-575-03151-7.
- Hardy, Sheila (2011). The Real Mrs Beeton: The Story of Eliza Acton. Stroud, Glous: History Press. p. 1. ISBN 978-0-7524-6680-4.
- Hope, Annette (2005). Londoners' Larder. Edinburgh: Mainstream Publishing. ISBN 978-1-84018-965-0.
- Hughes, Kathryn (2006). The Short Life and Long Times of Mrs Beeton. London: HarperCollins Publishers. ISBN 978-0-7524-6122-9.
- Humble, Nicola (2006). Culinary Pleasures. London: Faber and Faber. ISBN 978-0-571-22871-3.
- Hyde, Montgomery (1951). Mr and Mrs Beeton. London: George G. Harrap and Co. OCLC 4729698.
- Nown, Graham (1986). Mrs Beeton: 150 Years of Cookery and Household Management. London: Ward Lock. ISBN 978-0-7063-6459-0.
- Paxman, Jeremy (2009). The Victorians: Britain Through the Paintings of the Age. London: BBC Books. ISBN 978-1-84607-743-2.
- Richardson, Sarah (2013). The Political Worlds of Women: Gender and Politics in Nineteenth Century Britain. London: Routledge. ISBN 978-1-135-96493-1.
- Snodgrass, Mary Ellen (2004). Encyclopedia of Kitchen History. Abingdon, Oxon: Routledge. ISBN 978-1-135-45572-9.
- Spain, Nancy (1948). Mrs Beeton and her Husband. London: Collins. OCLC 3178766.
- Wilson, Roger; Wilson, Nancy (1983). Please Pass the Salt. Philadelphia, PA: George F. Stickley. ISBN 978-0-89313-027-5.
