= Boys of England =

Nineteenth century UK boys' weekly magazine

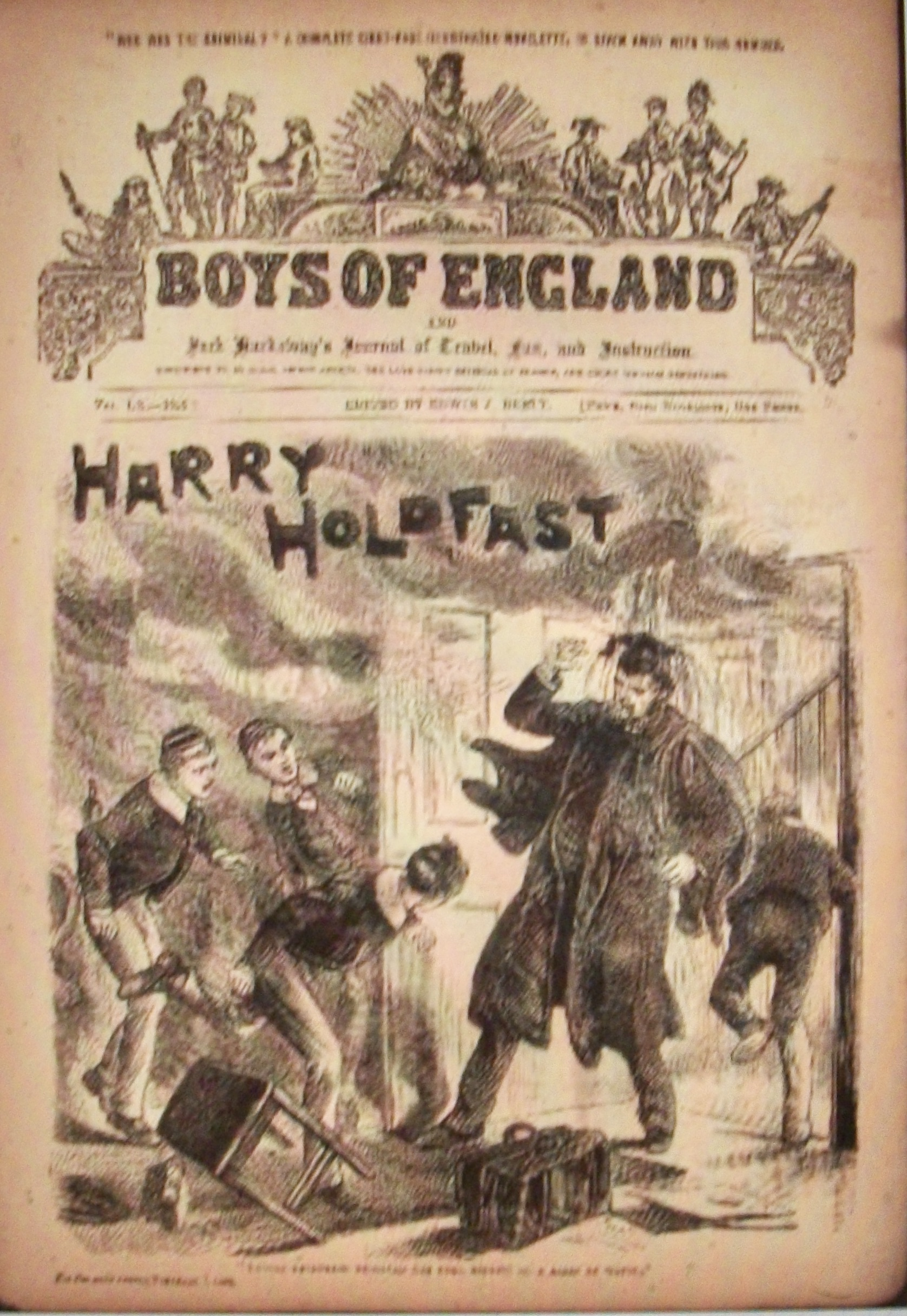
- Boys of England cover
- Frequency: Weekly
- First issue: 1866; 159 years ago
- Final issue: 1899
- Country: England
- Based in: London
- Language: English

Boys of England was a British boys' periodical issued weekly from 1866 to 1899, and has been called "the leading boys' periodical of the nineteenth century".

The magazine was based in London. Issues contained an average of eight pages, and sold for one penny. Each issue would contain an installment of a serialized story. Boys of England was edited by the publisher and former Chartist Edwin John Brett. By the 1870s it had a circulation of 250,000,

== Content ==
Articles exhorted boys to participate in healthy outdoor games and to contribute some of their pocket money to the journal's lifeboat fund which purchased the first Southend Lifeboat in 1879 (Brett named the vessel after the magazine and himself).

Boys of England had a mainly working-class readership, in comparison to middle-class competitors such as The Boy's Own Paper, It was relatively unconcerned with Empire. Subject matters which predominated were history, rebels, crime, and public schools.

In 1866 the periodical serialized Jack Ruston: or, Alone in the Pirate’s Lair, which was later reprinted as a book. In 1881 they published A Strange Woman about Calamity Jane.

=== Jack Harkaway stories ===
The first Jack Harkaway story, written by Bracebridge Hemyng, appeared in Boys of England in July 1871. The periodical's sales increased so much after the Harkaway stories began that the magazine's owner named his new home Harkaway House.

The serialized sections of these stories appeared in over 800 issues, and were later published as books. The novels were sold not only in the United Kingdom, but also in the United States, where they were advertised in the back of juvenile periodicals published by Street & Smith as part of the "Round the World Library."

Advertising for the books stated:

Every reader, young and old, has heard of Jack Harkaway. His remarkable adventures in out-of-the-way corners of the globe are really classics, and every one should read them. Jack is a splendid, manly character, full of life and strength and curiosity. He has a number of very interesting companions–Professor Mole, for instance, who is very funny. He also has some very strange enemies, who are anything but funny.

== See also ==
- The Childhood of Jack Harkaway
- British boys' magazines
