= Henry Dorling =

Racecourse clerk (d. 1873)

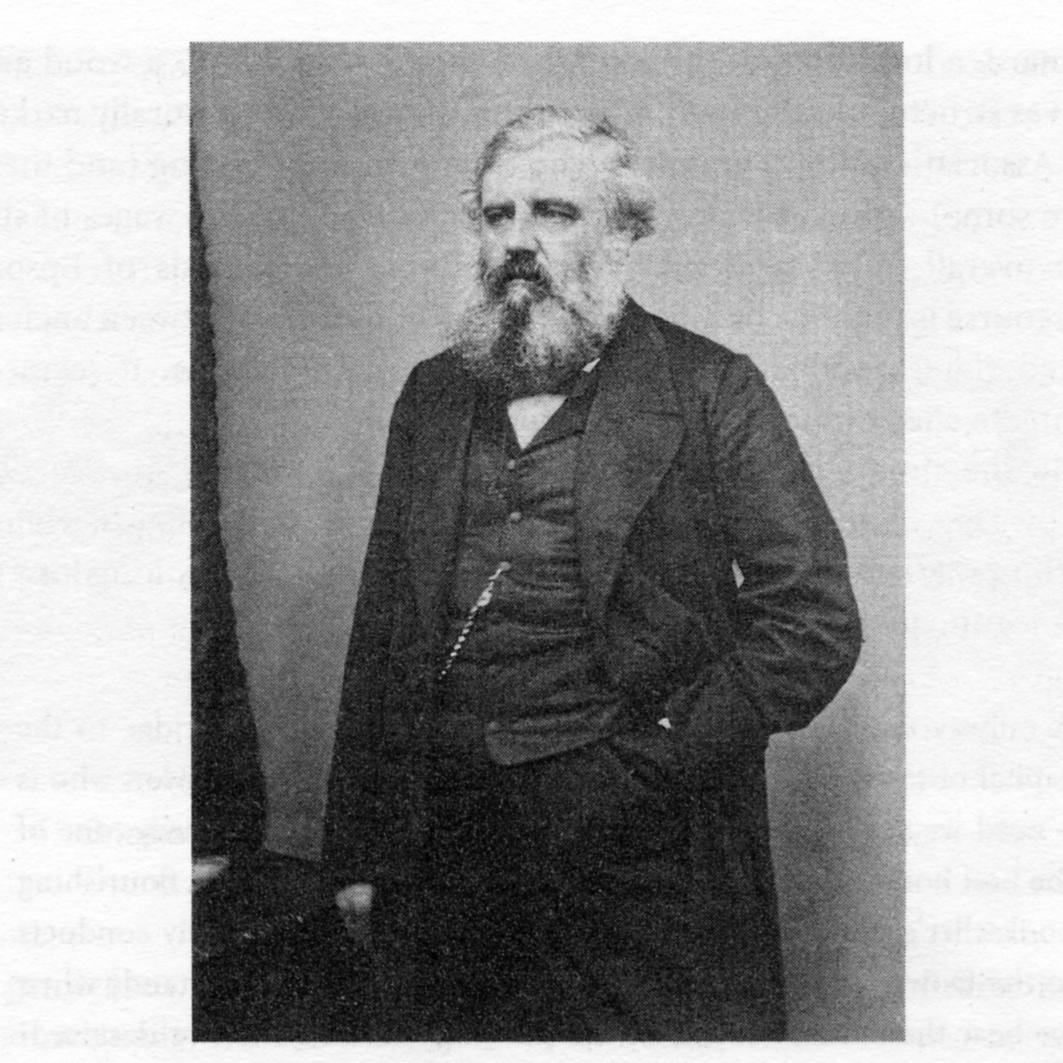
Dorling in the 1860s

Henry Dorling (died 20 March 1873) was the first Clerk of the course at Epsom Downs Racecourse and cookery writer Mrs Beeton's stepfather.

Dorling's father was a bookseller in Epsom, and Henry was apprenticed to a printer, returning to Epsom in 1834 to join his father's business, where he printed race cards for the course before becoming the first Clerk of the Course in 1840. In 1845 he leased the Grandstand for £1,000 per annum from the Epsom Grand Stand Association, which had been running it at a loss. He moved his printing operation into the basement of the stand, laid out a new racecourse in 1847, and extended the stand.

Dorling married his first wife, Emily, before returning to Epsom in 1834, and after her death he married widow Elizabeth Mayson (née Jerram) in 1843. He had two sons and two daughters by his late wife Emily, and she had three daughters (the eldest being Isabella, the future Mrs Beeton) and a son by her late husband Benjamin Mayson. They went on to have a further thirteen children. At one stage this large family lived most of the year in the Grandstand at Epsom Racecourse, along with Elizabeth's mother, Dorling's mother-in-law, "Granny Jerram" to the children, the children being sent away to Brighton on race days. Elizabeth died in 1871 and was the first person to be buried in the new municipal cemetery in Epsom: while an ordinary grave space would have cost one pound eleven shillings and six pence, Dorling paid seven pounds, seven shillings and six pence for his wife's burial space.

The National Portrait Gallery has a watercolour painting The children of Benjamin and Elizabeth Mayson, 1848, which is "attributed to Henry Dorling"; these children would have been his stepchildren, the future Mrs Beeton and her siblings.

By 1851 Dorling's father William had retired and Dorling moved his household to Ormonde House in the High Street, Epsom, where he ran a bookshop and lending library. At the time of his death in 1873 Dorling's home was Stroud Green House in Croydon, the site of which is now Ashburton Park.

In his will, Dorling left "20 fully paid-up £20 shares in the Epsom Grand Stand Association" to each of his sons, Henry Mayson Dorling and Edward Jonathan Dorling, and money to these sons, his other children, his daughters-in-law and his stepdaughter, and divided the rest of his property between all his children. The estate was noted as "below £80,000". Reporting on the proving of the will, The Times noted that The deceased was the well-known clerk of the course at the Epsom race meetings.

In the BBC drama The Secret Life of Mrs Beeton, broadcast in 2006, Henry Dorling was played by Jim Carter.

Dorling Drive, a street built in 1961 in Ewell, near Epsom, was named to commemorate Dorling.
