= Boys' Own =

Various British and US magazines

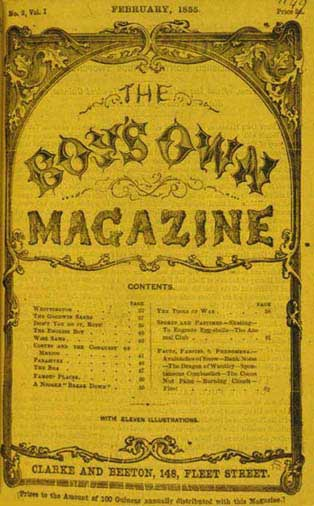
Beeton's Boy's Own Magazine, published in the UK from 1855 to 1890, was the first and most influential boys' magazine.

Boys' Own or Boy's Own or Boys Own, is the title of a varying series of similarly titled magazines, story papers, and newsletters published at various times and by various publishers, in the United Kingdom and the United States, from the mid-19th century to the mid-20th century, for preteen and teenage boys.

== History ==
In 1828 in London, and in 1829 in Boston, US, an encyclopedia for boys by William Clarke was published, titled The Boy's Own Book: A Complete Encyclopedia of all the Diversions, Athletic, Scientific, and Recreative, of Boyhood and Youth. According to sports historian Robert William Henderson, "It was a tremendous contrast to the juvenile books of the period, which emphasised piety, morals and instruction of mind and soul; it must have been received with whoops of delight by the youngsters of both countries." The encyclopedia was frequently updated and reprinted through the end of the century.

Beginning with Samuel Beeton's Boy's Own Magazine, published from 1855 to 1890, the first gender-specific boys' magazines emerged, with the aim of both entertaining and building character. The fun and educational Boys' Own–type magazines, created by various publishers from 1855 through 1920, helped shape ideas of masculinity in the youth of that period.

Titles of some of the other varying magazine franchises called "Boys Own", which total more than 15 different publications, included Boys' Own Journal, Boys' Own Library, Boy's Own Paper, The Boys' Own, Boys' Own Times and News of the World, etc. The most long-lived of the magazines was Boy's Own Paper, which was published from 1879 until 1967, becoming a British institution. The phrase "real Boys Own stuff" is still used in Britain to describe exciting feats of derring-do.

== 1986 fanzine ==
The title Boy's Own was used for a different type of publication, a fanzine, from 1986 to 1992, publishing two or three thousand copies, founded by Andrew Weatherall, Terry Farley, Steve Mayes, Steve Hall, and Cymon Eckel. It covered football, fashion, music, clubbing, politics and humour. The magazine's crew threw parties, and gave rise to a record label, Junior Boy's Own. In 2025 a hardback collection of all the fanzines was published.

== Content ==
The contents of the various magazine titles consisted largely of boyish and manly fiction and adventure tales. The magazines could also contain nonfiction stories and adventures, nonfiction and how-to instructional articles, and articles similar to scouting or Boy Scout activities. Contents also included articles on sports, articles on boys school life, and also detective fiction, Western fiction, science fiction, and other genres of interest to boys.

== See also ==
- Boys' Life
- British boys' magazines
