= Kathryn Hughes =

British academic, journalist, and biographer

- Born: 1959 (age 66–67); UK
- Occupations: Academic; biographer; journalist

Kathryn Hughes (born 1959) is a British academic, journalist and biographer. She is a Fellow of the Royal Historical Society and the Royal Society of Literature.

== Life ==
She was educated at Lady Margaret Hall, Oxford University and the University of East Anglia (UEA); her doctorate in Victorian history was developed into her first book, The Victorian Governess. She is the Director of Creative Non-Fiction at the University of East Anglia,

Hughes' book George Eliot: The Last Victorian was awarded the 1999 James Tait Black Memorial Prize for biography, a life of the author George Eliot, and her 2005 biography of Isabella Beeton, The Short Life and Long Times of Mrs Beeton was also well-received, and made the long list for the Samuel Johnson Prize. (Hughes's UEA website stated that the book had made the shortlist, but this turned out not to be true). Reviewing Mrs Beeton in the UK daily newspaper The Independent, Frances Spalding wrote: "There is seemingly no aspect of Victorian life that Kathryn Hughes cannot assimilate and understand from the inside. This is living history, in which massive research and impeccable scholarship is handled with invigorating panache".

Hughes has also reviewed and written for The Guardian, The Economist and The Times Literary Supplement. An occasional presenter of Open Book on BBC Radio 4, she also contributes to the same network's Saturday Review.

== Bibliography ==
=== Books ===
- Hughes, Kathryn (1993). The Victorian Governess. London: The Hambledon Press. ISBN 9781852850029.
  (Bloomsbury paperback ISBN 978-1-852850029)
- Hughes, Kathryn (1998). George Eliot: The Last Victorian. London: Fourth Estate. ISBN 978-1857024203.
- Hughes, Kathryn (2005). The Short Life and Long Times of Mrs Beeton. London: Fourth Estate. ISBN 978-1841153735.
- Hughes, Kathryn (2017). Victorians Undone: Tales of the Flesh in the Age of Decorum. London: Fourth Estate. ISBN 978-0007548361.
- Hughes, Kathryn (2024). Catland: Louis Wain and the Great Cat Mania. London: Fourth Estate. ISBN 978-0008365103.

=== Critical studies and reviews of Hughes' work ===
Victorians undone

- Lycett, Andrew (September 2017). "Stripping down the buttoned up". Reviews. History Today. 67 (9): 96.
