= Maypole Dairy Company =

British company

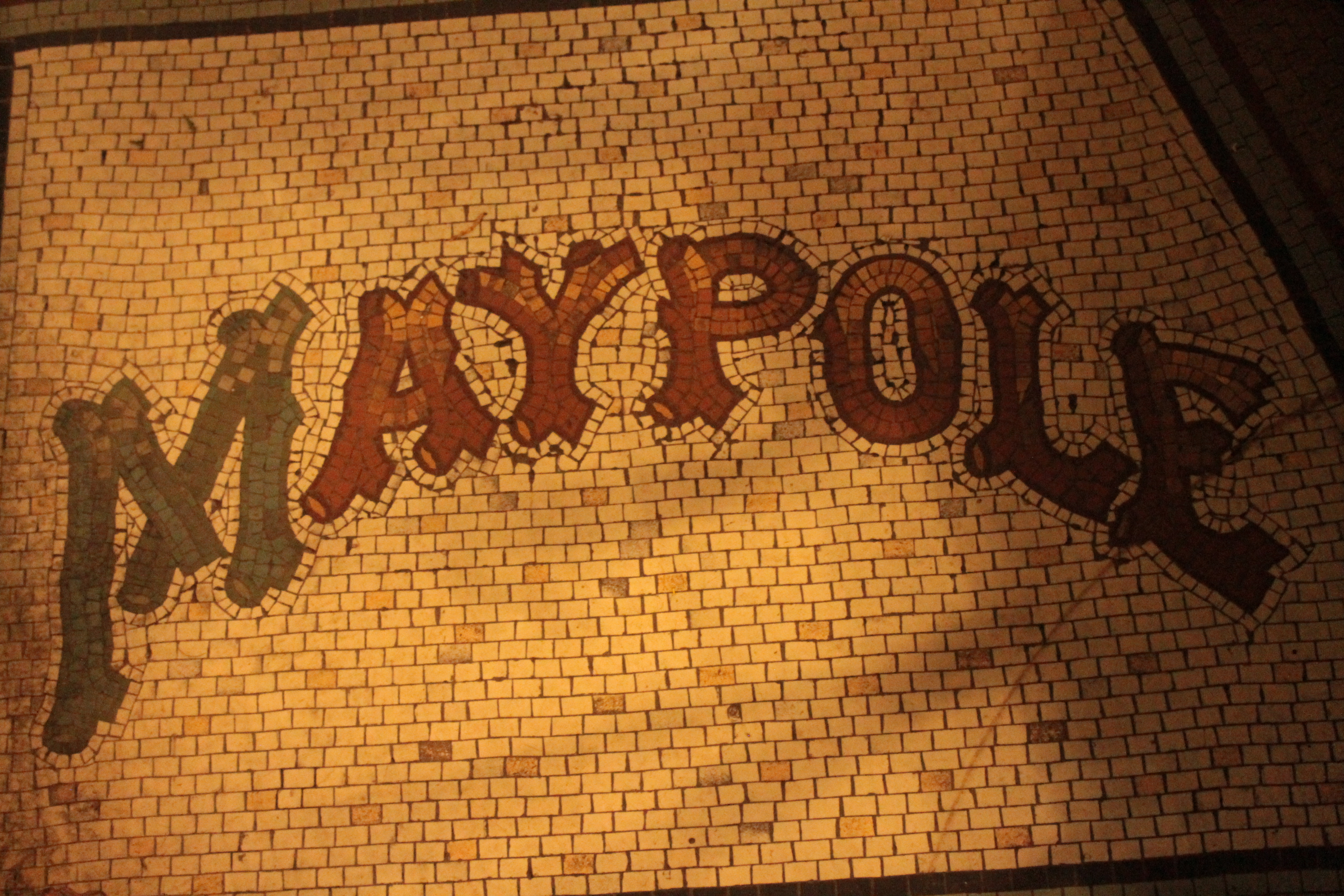
Entrance to former Maypole Dairy shop, 276 Canongate, Edinburgh

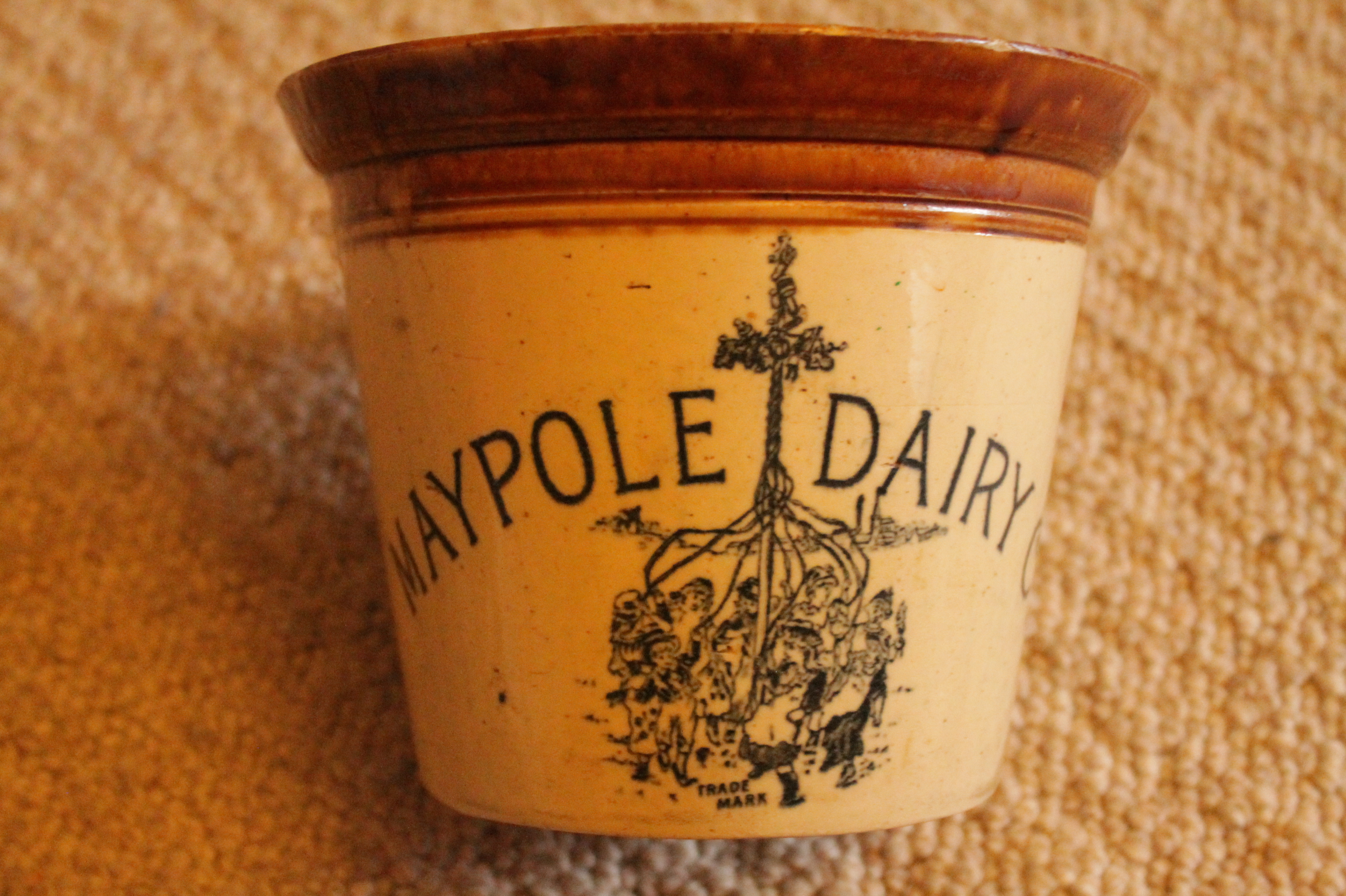
Maypole Dairy Co, container for lard c.1900

The Maypole Dairy Company or Maypole Dairies were an early chain of British dairies who are also noted as the first people to promote the widespread use of margarine as an alternative to butter, originally under the name of Butterine but following legal action protecting this name was known as margarine from 1887.

The logo of the company is a group of young people dancing around a maypole.

== Origins ==
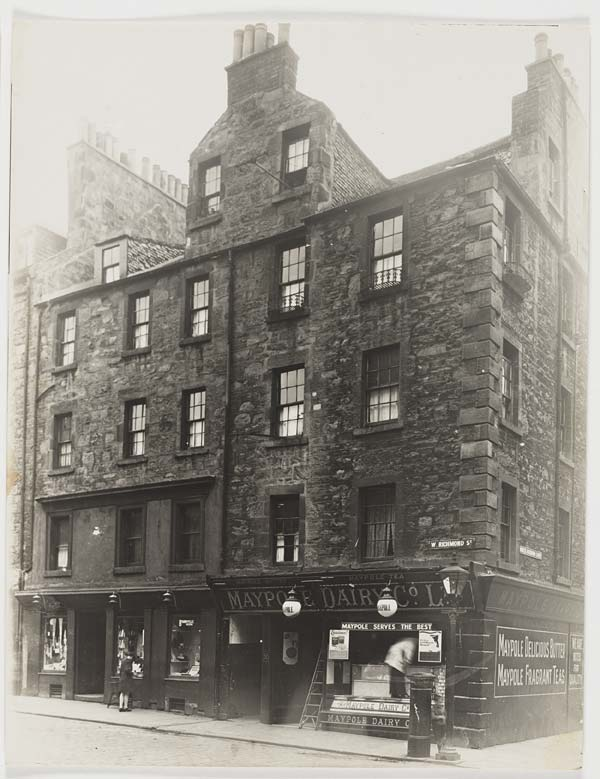
The Maypole Dairy on West Richmond Street in Edinburgh c.1900

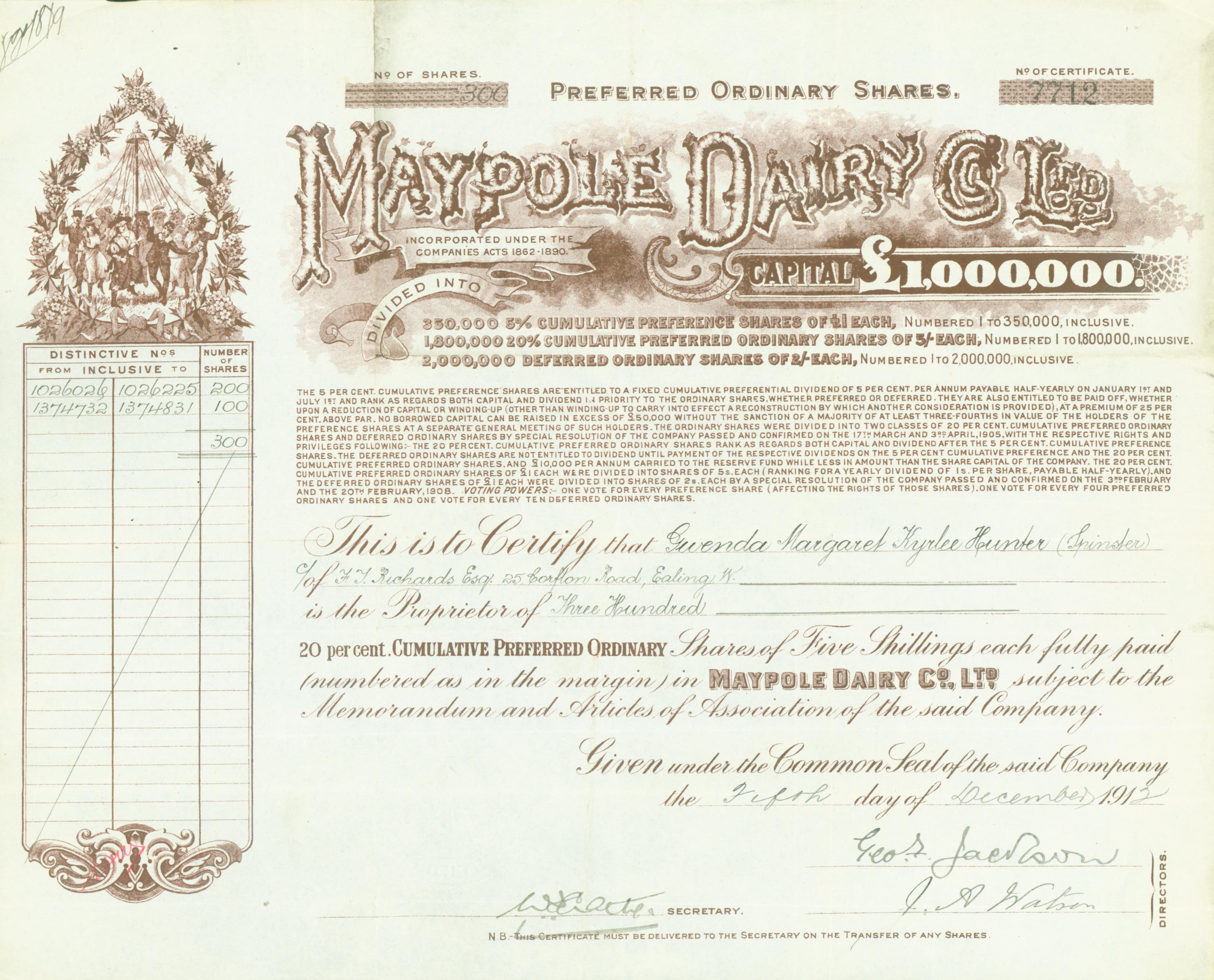
Cumulative preferred oridinary share of the Maypole Dairy Company Ltd., issued 5 December 1917

The dairy evolved in Birmingham from the Watson family, who had owned dairies in the area for generations. In 1859 George Jackson created the company Medova Dairies with three younger men the Watson brothers. Internal arguments regarding the introduction of margarine to their product range led George Watson to restart alone in 1887 as Maypole Dairies, leaving his brothers to continue with the Medova Dairies. George's main premises was at 67 Queen Street in Wolverhampton.

The family rejoined forces in 1898 but decided to keep both dairy names. Expanding greatly by 1905 Maypole Dairies had 105 branches (compared to 80 branches of Medova), including multiple branches in London, Manchester, Glasgow and other major cities and were a household name. They had strong links to Denmark and much of their dairy produce was Danish. Their main products were butter, cheese, margarine, eggs and condensed milk (but curiously not milk itself). By 1873 they were importing 30,000 tons of Danish butter per annum.

The company was a high-volume, low-margin company, providing dairy products at very affordable prices, and they focussed on working class areas. By 1915 they had 985 branches and they celebrated the opening of their 1000th shop in 1926, by that time the most extensive company in Britain. Over and above their retail units they owned eight creameries in Ireland and one in England, and had offices organising supplies in both Denmark and Sweden.

In 1902 they acquired the OMA margarine factory in Godley, Greater Manchester which produced 200 tons of margarine per week. By 1912 the company was making £550,000 per annum.

Their concentration on the promotion of margarine made them the biggest single producer in the UK supplying one third of all supplies by 1914. Unlike rival companies which used animal products, the Maypole margarine was made with groundnut oil from peanuts in West Africa.

The First World War had a huge negative impact due to restrictions of cargoes as margarine was largely made with oils from Africa. Rationing did further damage. Maypole sold their factory in Manchester to Lever Brothers.

In 1915 they took over Otto Monsted's huge OMA margarine factory in Southall in an attempt to recoup losses. This was the biggest margarine factory in the world and employed 650 people and made 35,000 tons of margarine per annum. They also bought the edible oil refinery in Erith in eastern London. By 1918 they had increased production to a staggering 100,000 tons per annum in Southall alone. By this time margarine accounted for 85% of all the Maypole sales.

== Rivalry and demise ==
Foreign competition, especially from Blue Band margarines started a price war in the 1920s which pushed prices and profits downwards. In 1924 the Watson family sold their majority share holding to the firm Home and Colonial Stores. In 1925 lard was added to the product range.

Ironically the name "Maypole Dairy" still continued to expand due to its customer good will, and it peaked in 1928 with a stunning 1040 stores and 18 creameries.

In 1929 the huge Southall factory was sold to "Wall's" to make sausages and ice-cream.

Sir William George Watson (the company chairman) died in 1930 leaving £2 million.

In 1931 their West African peanut plantations were sold to the United Africa Company (controlled by Unilever).

By 1939 stores had dropped to 977 and World War II rationing forced further diversification.

The Maypole brand survived until 1964 when it was absorbed with other companies by Allied Suppliers and a central headquarters created in London. The final Maypole Dairy closed in 1970.

The name survives mainly in tile-work at entranceways and occasionally internally (most of the dairies had tiled interiors).

The rights to the Maypole Dairy brand name are owned by Morrisons supermarkets.

== Trivia ==
Their factory in Southall gave name to Margarine Road (later renamed Bridge Road).

== Appearance in Film ==
In the Ealing comedy The Magnet one scene is set in a Liverpool branch of Maypole Dairies.
