= 2023 Goodyear 400 =

NASCAR Cup Series race

Race details
- Race 13 of 36 in the 2023 NASCAR Cup Series
- Date: May 14, 2023
- Location: Darlington Raceway in Darlington, South Carolina
- Course: Permanent racing facility
- Course length: 1.366 miles (2.198 km)
- Distance: 295 laps, 402.97 mi (648.517 km)
- Scheduled distance: 293 laps, 400.238 mi (644.121 km)
- Average speed: 118.88 miles per hour (191.32 km/h)

Pole position
Driver	Martin Truex Jr.	Joe Gibbs Racing
- Time: 29.028

Most laps led
Driver	Martin Truex Jr.	Joe Gibbs Racing
- Laps: 145

Winner
No. 24	William Byron	Hendrick Motorsports

Television in the United States
- Network: FS1
- Announcers: Mike Joy, Clint Bowyer, Richard Petty (Stage 1), Kyle Petty (Stage 1), Carl Edwards (Stage 2), and Bill Elliott (Stage 3)

Radio in the United States
- Radio: MRN
- Booth announcers: Alex Hayden, Mike Bagley, and Rusty Wallace
- Turn announcers: Dave Moody (1 & 2) and Kurt Becker (3 & 4)

The 2023 Goodyear 400 was a NASCAR Cup Series race held on May 14, 2023, at Darlington Raceway in Darlington, South Carolina. Contested over 295 laps – extended from 293 laps due to an overtime finish, on the 1.366-mile (2.198 km) egg-shaped oval, it was the 13th race of the 2023 NASCAR Cup Series season. It was the 67th running of the event.

== Report ==
=== Background ===
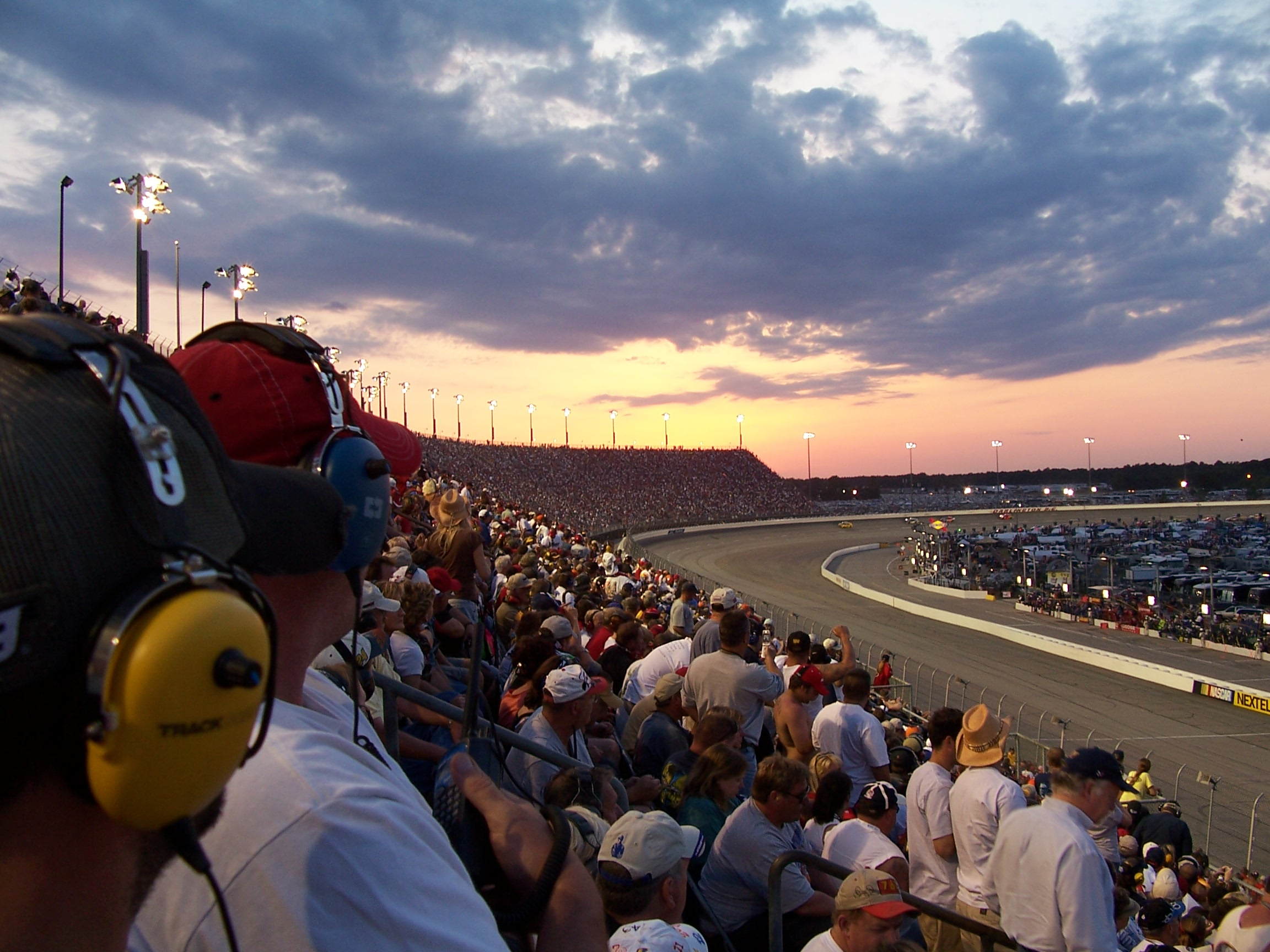
Darlington Raceway where the race was held.

Darlington Raceway is a race track built for NASCAR racing located near Darlington, South Carolina. It is nicknamed "The Lady in Black" and "The Track Too Tough to Tame" by many NASCAR fans and drivers and advertised as "A NASCAR Tradition." It is of a unique, somewhat egg-shaped design, an oval with the ends of very different configurations, a condition which supposedly arose from the proximity of one end of the track to a minnow pond the owner refused to relocate. This situation makes it very challenging for the crews to set up their cars' handling in a way that is effective at both ends.

Since 2015, the race has hosted NASCAR's Throwback weekend, which features cars sporting paint schemes that pay homage to past teams and drivers. (The lineage of this race includes races billed as the Southern 500 from 2005 to 2020).

==== Entry list ====
- (R) denotes rookie driver.
- (i) denotes the driver ineligible for series driver points.

No.	Driver	Team	Manufacturer	Sponsor or throwback
1	Ross Chastain	Trackhouse Racing	Chevrolet	Worldwide Express/UPS – Dale Jarrett's 2001 No. 88 paint scheme (Worldwide Express is an authorized UPS reseller)
2	Austin Cindric	Team Penske	Ford	Freightliner Trucks
3	Austin Dillon	Richard Childress Racing	Chevrolet	Bass Pro Shops
4	Kevin Harvick	Stewart-Haas Racing	Ford	Sunny Delight – Harvick's cancelled 2001 No. 30 America Online paint scheme (he was originally scheduled to run part-time that season, but the death of Dale Earnhardt at the 2001 Daytona 500 moved him full-time in the No. 29)
5	Kyle Larson	Hendrick Motorsports	Chevrolet	HendrickCars.com – Tony Stewart's 2009 second-tier series No. 80 paint scheme that won at Daytona.
6	Brad Keselowski	RFK Racing	Ford	BP - Castrol GTX Classic, used most notably by Castrol-sponsored NHRA driver John Force (1987–93) and also Tom Walkinshaw Racing's Jaguar XJR-9 in IMSA.
7	Corey LaJoie	Spire Motorsports	Chevrolet	NationsGuard – Tribute to LaJoie's grandfather Don LaJoie
8	Kyle Busch	Richard Childress Racing	Chevrolet	Lucas Oil – Busch's first win with RCR at Fontana
9	Chase Elliott	Hendrick Motorsports	Chevrolet	LLumar Window Film – Bill Elliott's 2001 Dodge paint scheme
10	Aric Almirola	Stewart-Haas Racing	Ford	Smithfield Foods – Dale Earnhardt Jr.'s No. 8 Budweiser MLB paint scheme that won at the 2001 Pepsi 400
11	Denny Hamlin	Joe Gibbs Racing	Toyota	FedEx – 50th anniversary tribute scheme using 1973 logos
12	Ryan Blaney	Team Penske	Ford	Menards/Dutch Boy Paint – Dave Blaney's 1995 World of Outlaws No. 12 Casey Luna Ford/Vivarin paint scheme
14	Chase Briscoe	Stewart-Haas Racing	Ford	Mahindra Tractors – Tony Stewart's 2000 Turkey Night Grand Prix No. 9 paint scheme
15	Brennan Poole (i)	Rick Ware Racing	Ford	MACC Door Systems - Bobby Allison's 1978 Norris paint scheme that won the 1978 Daytona 500
16	A. J. Allmendinger	Kaulig Racing	Chevrolet	Black's Tire & Wheel Distributors
17	Chris Buescher	RFK Racing	Ford	Fifth Third Bank
19	Martin Truex Jr.	Joe Gibbs Racing	Toyota	Auto-Owners Insurance – Truex's 2017 No. 78 paint scheme
20	Christopher Bell	Joe Gibbs Racing	Toyota	DeWalt – Matt Kenseth's 2003 No. 17 paint scheme
21	Harrison Burton	Wood Brothers Racing	Ford	DEX Imaging – Jeff Burton's 1999 No. 99 Exide paint scheme
22	Joey Logano	Team Penske	Ford	Shell – Mark Donohue's 1973 No. 16 AMC Matador paint scheme to commemorate the 50th anniversary of Penske's first NASCAR win
23	Bubba Wallace	23XI Racing	Toyota	Dr Pepper
24	William Byron	Hendrick Motorsports	Chevrolet	Axalta – Jeff Gordon's 1998 DuPont NASCAR 50th Anniversary gold paint scheme raced at that year's NASCAR All-Star Race
31	Justin Haley	Kaulig Racing	Chevrolet	Leaf Filter
34	Michael McDowell	Front Row Motorsports	Ford	Stage Front VIP
38	Todd Gilliland	Front Row Motorsports	Ford	Serial 1 E-bikes – Elton Sawyer's 1997 NASCAR Busch Series Barbasol paint scheme
41	Ryan Preece	Stewart-Haas Racing	Ford	United Rentals – Jeff Preece's 1998 Late Model No. 4 paint scheme
42	Noah Gragson (R)	Legacy Motor Club	Chevrolet	Sunseeker Resort – Jimmie Johnson's No. 48 Lowe's stars and stripes paint scheme that won at the 2014 Coca-Cola 600
43	Erik Jones	Legacy Motor Club	Chevrolet	Allegiant Air – Richard Petty's 1968 Plymouth with a vinyl roof (the black parts of the wrap replicated the vinyl roof)
45	Tyler Reddick	23XI Racing	Toyota	McDonald's/Xfinity/Monster Energy – Kurt Busch's 2003 No. 97 Rubbermaid paint scheme which finished second to Ricky Craven at Darlington
47	Ricky Stenhouse Jr.	JTG Daugherty Racing	Chevrolet	Kroger/Country Crock – Special Mother's Day throwback featuring Stenhouse's favorite grilled cheese and Dale Jarrett's 2001 No. 88 UPS paint scheme
48	Josh Berry (i)	Hendrick Motorsports	Chevrolet	Ally Financial – Spotter and former driver Kevin Hamlin's 2007 NASCAR Busch Series No. 42 Havoline paint scheme
51	Ryan Newman	Rick Ware Racing	Ford	Jacob Industries – Newman's 2002 No. 12 Mobil 1 paint scheme that scored his first career win at New Hampshire
54	Ty Gibbs (R)	Joe Gibbs Racing	Toyota	Shriners Hospitals for Children – Bobby Labonte's 1996 No. 18 Interstate Batteries/Washington Redskins paint scheme that honored Joe Gibbs' induction into the Pro Football Hall of Fame
77	Ty Dillon	Spire Motorsports	Chevrolet	Garner – Tribute to Joe Lee Johnson (inaugural Coca-Cola 600 winner)
78	B. J. McLeod	Live Fast Motorsports	Chevrolet	The Daily Downforce/Out of the Groove
99	Daniel Suárez	Trackhouse Racing	Chevrolet	Shell – Ricky Rudd's 1988 No. 26 paint scheme with Quaker State (a Shell brand since 2002)
Official entry list

== Practice ==
Chase Elliott was the fastest in the practice session with a time of 29.231 seconds and a speed of 168.232 mph (270.743 km/h).

=== Practice results ===
Pos	No.	Driver	Team	Manufacturer	Time	Speed
1	9	Chase Elliott	Hendrick Motorsports	Chevrolet	29.231	168.232
2	43	Erik Jones	Legacy Motor Club	Chevrolet	29.332	167.653
3	24	William Byron	Hendrick Motorsports	Chevrolet	29.350	167.550
Official practice results

== Qualifying ==
Martin Truex Jr. scored the pole for the race with a time of 29.028 and a speed of 169.409 mph (272.637 km/h).

=== Qualifying results ===
Pos	No.	Driver	Team	Manufacturer	R1	R2
1	19	Martin Truex Jr.	Joe Gibbs Racing	Toyota	28.941	29.028
2	23	Bubba Wallace	23XI Racing	Toyota	29.084	29.040
3	47	Ricky Stenhouse Jr.	JTG Daugherty Racing	Chevrolet	29.183	29.141
4	24	William Byron	Hendrick Motorsports	Chevrolet	29.246	29.212
5	1	Ross Chastain	Trackhouse Racing	Chevrolet	29.112	29.255
6	99	Daniel Suárez	Trackhouse Racing	Chevrolet	28.946	29.300
7	5	Kyle Larson	Hendrick Motorsports	Chevrolet	29.052	29.348
8	11	Denny Hamlin	Joe Gibbs Racing	Toyota	29.012	29.365
9	45	Tyler Reddick	23XI Racing	Toyota	29.147	29.392
10	6	Brad Keselowski	RFK Racing	Ford	28.872	29.572
11	12	Ryan Blaney	Team Penske	Ford	29.059	—
12	8	Kyle Busch	Richard Childress Racing	Chevrolet	29.107	—
13	54	Ty Gibbs (R)	Joe Gibbs Racing	Toyota	29.114	—
14	21	Harrison Burton	Wood Brothers Racing	Ford	29.117	—
15	22	Joey Logano	Team Penske	Ford	29.139	—
16	20	Christopher Bell	Joe Gibbs Racing	Toyota	29.238	—
17	10	Aric Almirola	Stewart-Haas Racing	Ford	29.271	—
18	3	Austin Dillon	Richard Childress Racing	Chevrolet	29.291	—
19	34	Michael McDowell	Front Row Motorsports	Ford	29.324	—
20	4	Kevin Harvick	Stewart-Haas Racing	Ford	29.348	—
21	9	Chase Elliott	Hendrick Motorsports	Chevrolet	29.354	—
22	31	Justin Haley	Kaulig Racing	Chevrolet	29.386	—
23	48	Josh Berry (i)	Hendrick Motorsports	Chevrolet	29.399	—
24	38	Todd Gilliland	Front Row Motorsports	Ford	29.413	—
25	2	Austin Cindric	Team Penske	Ford	29.428	—
26	51	Ryan Newman	Rick Ware Racing	Ford	29.440	—
27	17	Chris Buescher	RFK Racing	Ford	29.456	—
28	43	Erik Jones	Legacy Motor Club	Chevrolet	29.463	—
29	42	Noah Gragson (R)	Legacy Motor Club	Chevrolet	29.477	—
30	16	A. J. Allmendinger	Kaulig Racing	Chevrolet	29.501	—
31	14	Chase Briscoe	Stewart-Haas Racing	Ford	29.684	—
32	41	Ryan Preece	Stewart-Haas Racing	Ford	29.762	—
33	77	Ty Dillon	Spire Motorsports	Chevrolet	29.961	—
34	7	Corey LaJoie	Spire Motorsports	Chevrolet	30.066	—
35	78	B. J. McLeod	Live Fast Motorsports	Chevrolet	30.577	—
36	15	Brennan Poole (i)	Rick Ware Racing	Ford	30.684	—
Official qualifying results

== Race ==
=== Race results ===
==== Stage results ====
Stage One Laps: 90

Pos	No	Driver	Team	Manufacturer	Points
1	19	Martin Truex Jr.	Joe Gibbs Racing	Toyota	10
2	24	William Byron	Hendrick Motorsports	Chevrolet	9
3	23	Bubba Wallace	23XI Racing	Toyota	8
4	1	Ross Chastain	Trackhouse Racing	Chevrolet	7
5	8	Kyle Busch	Richard Childress Racing	Chevrolet	6
6	6	Brad Keselowski	RFK Racing	Ford	5
7	47	Ricky Stenhouse Jr.	JTG Daugherty Racing	Chevrolet	4
8	4	Kevin Harvick	Stewart-Haas Racing	Ford	3
9	45	Tyler Reddick	23XI Racing	Toyota	2
10	20	Christopher Bell	Joe Gibbs Racing	Toyota	1
Official stage one results

Stage Two Laps: 95

Pos	No	Driver	Team	Manufacturer	Points
1	1	Ross Chastain	Trackhouse Racing	Chevrolet	10
2	8	Kyle Busch	Richard Childress Racing	Chevrolet	9
3	5	Kyle Larson	Hendrick Motorsports	Chevrolet	8
4	24	William Byron	Hendrick Motorsports	Chevrolet	7
5	6	Brad Keselowski	RFK Racing	Ford	6
6	20	Christopher Bell	Joe Gibbs Racing	Toyota	5
7	4	Kevin Harvick	Stewart-Haas Racing	Ford	4
8	12	Ryan Blaney	Team Penske	Ford	3
9	47	Ricky Stenhouse Jr.	JTG Daugherty Racing	Chevrolet	2
10	19	Martin Truex Jr.	Joe Gibbs Racing	Toyota	1
Official stage two results

=== Final Stage results ===
Stage Three Laps: 108

Pos	Grid	No	Driver	Team	Manufacturer	Laps	Points
1	4	24	William Byron	Hendrick Motorsports	Chevrolet	295	56
2	20	4	Kevin Harvick	Stewart-Haas Racing	Ford	295	42
3	21	9	Chase Elliott	Hendrick Motorsports	Chevrolet	295	34
4	10	6	Brad Keselowski	RFK Racing	Ford	295	44
5	2	23	Bubba Wallace	23XI Racing	Toyota	295	40
6	14	21	Harrison Burton	Wood Brothers Racing	Ford	295	31
7	12	8	Kyle Busch	Richard Childress Racing	Chevrolet	295	45
8	22	31	Justin Haley	Kaulig Racing	Chevrolet	295	29
9	11	12	Ryan Blaney	Team Penske	Ford	295	31
10	27	17	Chris Buescher	RFK Racing	Ford	295	27
11	24	38	Todd Gilliland	Front Row Motorsports	Ford	295	26
12	8	11	Denny Hamlin	Joe Gibbs Racing	Toyota	295	25
13	3	47	Ricky Stenhouse Jr.	JTG Daugherty Racing	Chevrolet	295	30
14	16	20	Christopher Bell	Joe Gibbs Racing	Toyota	295	29
15	32	41	Ryan Preece	Stewart-Haas Racing	Ford	295	22
16	13	54	Ty Gibbs (R)	Joe Gibbs Racing	Toyota	295	21
17	31	14	Chase Briscoe	Stewart-Haas Racing	Ford	295	20
18	15	22	Joey Logano	Team Penske	Ford	295	19
19	25	2	Austin Cindric	Team Penske	Ford	295	18
20	7	5	Kyle Larson	Hendrick Motorsports	Chevrolet	295	25
21	17	10	Aric Almirola	Stewart-Haas Racing	Ford	295	16
22	9	45	Tyler Reddick	23XI Racing	Toyota	295	7
23	30	16	A. J. Allmendinger	Kaulig Racing	Chevrolet	294	14
24	34	7	Corey LaJoie	Spire Motorsports	Chevrolet	293	13
25	28	43	Erik Jones	Legacy Motor Club	Chevrolet	293	12
26	29	42	Noah Gragson (R)	Legacy Motor Club	Chevrolet	293	11
27	33	77	Ty Dillon	Spire Motorsports	Chevrolet	293	10
28	26	51	Ryan Newman	Rick Ware Racing	Ford	291	9
29	5	1	Ross Chastain	Trackhouse Racing	Chevrolet	287	25
30	23	48	Josh Berry (i)	Hendrick Motorsports	Chevrolet	286	0
31	1	19	Martin Truex Jr.	Joe Gibbs Racing	Toyota	280	17
32	35	78	B. J. McLeod	Live Fast Motorsports	Chevrolet	226	5
33	19	34	Michael McDowell	Front Row Motorsports	Ford	200	4
34	6	99	Daniel Suárez	Trackhouse Racing	Chevrolet	199	3
35	18	3	Austin Dillon	Richard Childress Racing	Chevrolet	196	2
36	36	15	Brennan Poole (i)	Rick Ware Racing	Ford	39	0
Official race results

=== Race statistics ===
- Lead changes: 19 among 8 different drivers
- Cautions/Laps: 8 for 47 laps
- Red flags: 0
- Time of race: 3 hours, 23 minutes, and 23 seconds
- Average speed: 118.88 miles per hour (191.32 km/h)

== Media ==
=== Television ===
The race was carried by FS1 in the United States. Mike Joy and Clint Bowyer called the race from the broadcast booth. Richard Petty, Kyle Petty, Carl Edwards and Bill Elliott swapped through the booth in stage 1, 2, and 3. Jamie Little and Regan Smith handled the pit road for the television side. Larry McReynolds provided insight from the Fox Sports studio in Charlotte.

FS1
Booth announcers	Pit reporters	In-race analyst
Lap-by-lap: Mike Joy; Color-commentator: Clint Bowyer; Color-commentator: Richard Petty (Stage 1); Color-commentator: Kyle Petty (Stage 1); Color-commentator: Carl Edwards (Stage 2); Color-commentator: Bill Elliott (Stage 3)	Jamie Little; Regan Smith	Larry McReynolds

=== Radio ===
MRN had the radio call for the race, which was also simulcasted on Sirius XM NASCAR Radio.

MRN Radio
Booth announcers	Turn announcers	Pit reporters
Lead announcer: Alex Hayden; Announcer: Mike Bagley; Announcer: Rusty Wallace	Turns 1 & 2: Dave Moody; Turns 3 & 4: Kurt Becker	Kim Coon; Jason Toy; Winston Kelley

== Standings after the race ==
Drivers' Championship standings

	Pos	Driver	Points
	1	Ross Chastain	429
	2	Christopher Bell	402 (–27)
2	3	Kevin Harvick	400 (–29)
	4	Denny Hamlin	393 (–36)
4	5	William Byron	387 (–42)
3	6	Martin Truex Jr.	385 (–44)
	7	Ryan Blaney	381 (–48)
2	8	Tyler Reddick	371 (–58)
1	9	Brad Keselowski	365 (–64)
2	10	Kyle Larson	363 (–66)
1	11	Kyle Busch	353 (–76)
1	12	Joey Logano	334 (–95)
	13	Chris Buescher	329 (–100)
	14	Ricky Stenhouse Jr.	325 (–104)
3	15	Bubba Wallace	293 (–136)
1	16	Chase Briscoe	275 (–154)
Official driver's standings

Manufacturers' Championship standings

Pos	Manufacturer	Points
1	Chevrolet	492
2	Toyota	454 (–38)
3	Ford	438 (–54)

- Note: Only the first 16 positions are included for the driver standings.
- . – Driver has clinched a position in the NASCAR Cup Series playoffs.

Previous race: 2023 AdventHealth 400	NASCAR Cup Series; 2023 season	Next race: 2023 Coca-Cola 600
