= Becel =

Brand name of margarine made by Upfield

- Product type: Margarine
- Current owner: Flora Food Group
- Related brands: Flora
- Markets: Global
- Previous owners: Unilever
- Website: Becel (Canada)

Becel is a brand of margarine produced by Dutch company Flora Food Group. In France, it is sold as Fruit D'or, and in the United States as Promise.

== Name ==
The name Becel originates from the initials BCL (Blood Cholesterol-Lowering). When introduced, the makers of Becel claimed to achieve a blood cholesterol-lowering effect by modifying the triacylglycerol (TAG) profile of the fat used in the margarine under the idea that an increased level of polyunsaturated fatty acids (PUFA) reduces the blood cholesterol level.

== "Pro-active" brand ==
More recently, products were introduced under the "Pro-active" sub-brand.

In light of supporting evidence from various clinical trials, Becel Pro-Activ gained the European Food Safety Authority’s (EFSA) approval for its claim to reduce cholesterol levels. It does not reduce the risk of heart disease and is not claimed to do so by Upfield, although many consumers believe it does.

== 2010 Academy Awards controversy ==
In 2009, Becel commissioned Sarah Polley to direct a two-minute short "to inspire women to take better care of that particular vital organ" [the heart]. A week before the short's planned premiere in Canada, a commercial break during the CTV broadcast of the 82nd Academy Awards, Polley attracted headlines for taking her name off the film. Polley had understood that the film, titled "The Heart", would be used to promote the Heart and Stroke Foundation of Canada, but was unhappy with the association with Becel. "Regretfully, I am forced to remove my name from the film and disassociate myself from it. I have never actively promoted any corporate brand and cannot do so now."

== See also ==
- Flora (spread)
