= Fernando Fernández (executive) =

Argentine businessman (born 1966)

- Born: 1966 (age 59–60); Argentina
- Education: University of Buenos Aires
- Occupation: Business executive
- Title: Chief executive officer of Unilever
- Term: 1 March 2025 – present
- Predecessor: Hein Schumacher

Fernando Fernández (born 1966) is an Argentine business executive who has been chief executive officer (CEO) of Unilever since March 2025, succeeding Hein Schumacher. He was chief financial officer (CFO) of Unilever from 2024 to 2025.

== Early life and education ==
Fernández was born in 1966 in Argentina. He holds a degree in economics from the University of Buenos Aires.

== Career ==
Fernández joined Unilever in December 1987 as a production costs analyst in Buenos Aires. Over the next two decades, he rotated through finance, marketing and supply chain roles in Argentina and the wider River Plate region. He later led Unilever's hair care business in Latin America (1998–2001) and Europe (2002–04) and became senior vice president of global hair care in London (2004–07). His first general-management assignment was as senior vice president for the Philippines (2007–10), where he oversaw a return to volume growth after the global financial crisis.

In 2011, Fernández became executive vice president in Brazil and steered the subsidiary through a period of high inflation and currency volatility, expanding local production to protect margins. In 2019, he was named executive vice-president Latin America, integrating country clusters and trimming under-performing stock-keeping units to lift operating profits.

In January 2024, Fernández undertook an operational overhaul and later assumed oversight of supply chain, procurement, digital and business services.

In February 2025 Unilever's board replaced Schumacher with Fernández. Shortly after taking office, Fernández set priorities to boost influencer marketing, move half of Unilever's media budget to social channels and divest about €1 billion in non-core European food assets.
