= The Magnet (film) =

1950 British comedy by Charles Frend

- Original UK quad format film poster
- Directed by: Charles Frend
- Written by: T. E. B. Clarke
- Produced by: Michael Balcon
- Starring: Stephen Murray; Kay Walsh; James Fox
- Cinematography: Lionel Banes
- Edited by: Bernard Gribble
- Music by: William Alwyn
- Color process: Black and white
- Production company: Ealing Studios
- Distributed by: GFD
- Release date: October 1950 (UK)
- Running time: 78 minutes
- Country: United Kingdom
- Language: English
- Box office: £75,000

The Magnet is a 1950 British comedy film directed by Charles Frend and starring Stephen Murray, Kay Walsh, and in his first starring role James Fox (billed as William Fox). It was written by T. E. B. Clarke. A young Wallasey boy obtains a magnet by deception, leading to much confusion. When he is acclaimed as a hero, he is shamed by his own sense of guilt.

== Plot ==
Eleven year old Johnny Brent is home from school during a scarlet fever outbreak, but not making much attempt to stay isolated. He lives in New Brighton on the North West coast. After watching his father board the ferry to his work as a psychologist in Liverpool, he spends the rest of the morning playing on the beach.

He manages to con a younger boy out of a large horseshoe magnet by trading it for an "invisible watch". The other boy's nanny is not happy with the swap and chases Johnny shouting, "thief". Johnny runs off and is almost run over by a car, as he spots a religious sandwich man and sees this as retribution prompting Johnny to get rid of the magnet. After an older boy uses the magnet to cheat at pinball and Johnny is implicated, Johnny continues to try to get rid of the magnet. He meets an eccentric iron lung maker who is raising funds for the local disclaimed hospital, and gives him the magnet in lieu of money. Later, the iron lung maker, is demonstrating his equipment in the middle of a seaside beauty contest, and tells the story of the gift of the magnet to the crowd, slightly embellishing for effect. The maker is prompted by Johnny's father to auction the magnet. The magnet goes for £40 but is refused by the final bidder. The maker goes on to tell the story of the magnet at other various fund-raising events, exaggerating wildly and portraying Johnny as everything from a Fauntleroy to a Dickensian ragamuffin, allowing the maker to re-auction the magnet continuously, finally achieving the goal of the cost of the iron lung.

On a train returning to school, Johnny sees the little boy's nanny and overhears her telling her friend about her budgerigar, which she says has died of a broken heart. Johnny mistakenly thinks she is talking about the little boy himself, and becomes convinced that he has caused the death of the boy. Various other things he overhears confirms his theory. His mum realises something is wrong and tries to make him feel useful. She sends him to the local Maypole Dairy on an errand. He is again startled by a policeman and hides in the back of a Jacob's cream crackers van, which takes him to the Liverpool slums, where he comes into conflict with the local boys. He wins them over by convincing them he is a fugitive from the police. They hide him in a building on the disused pier. He opens a tin of soup and eats some dry macaroni bought on the errand.

He saves the life of one boy who had fallen through a disused pier. The injured boy ends up in an iron lung made by the man to whom Johnny gave the magnet. When Johnny visits the boy, he sees the magnet mounted on the iron lung and is reunited with the inventor, who is delighted to have found Johnny again. Johnny is awarded the Civic Gold Medal. When he later re-encounters the original boy on the beach he swaps the medal for his old "invisible watch" and clears his conscience.

== Cast ==
- Stephen Murray as Dr Brent
- Kay Walsh as Mrs Brent
- James Fox as Johnny Brent (as William Fox)
- Meredith Edwards as Harper
- Gladys Henson as Nanny
- Thora Hird as Nanny's friend
- Michael Brooke (as Michael Brooke Jr) as Kit
- Wylie Watson as Pickering
- Julien Mitchell as mayor
- Anthony Oliver as policeman
- Thomas Johnston as Perce
- Geoffrey Yin as Choppo
- Molly Hamley-Clifford as Mrs Dean
- Harold Goodwin as pin-table man
- Joan Hickson as Mrs Ward
- Joss Ambler as businessman
- Sam Kydd as postman
- Russell Waters as doctor
- James Robertson Justice as tramp (as Seumas Mor na Fesag)

== Production and casting ==
The Magnet was filmed on location in and around New Brighton, Wallasey, the Wirral, Cheshire, Liverpool, Ealing and at Ealing Studios, London. Given its setting, however, authentic local accents are absent until almost the end of the film, in a scene filmed in the shadow of the Liverpool Cathedral. The Chinese boy Choppo appears in this scene, which was unusual for the time in film, although there had been a significant Chinese community in Liverpool since the 1860s, but when he is called home by his mother in Chinese, explains this to his friends in a fluent Liverpool accent.

James Fox (then known as William) had appeared in The Miniver Story earlier in the year, and this was his first starring role, at the age of 11; his performance was largely appreciated, being described by the British Film Institute's reviewer as "certainly lively enough as the over-imaginative Johnny". Stalwarts of Ealing's repertory ensemble, however, such as Stanley Holloway and Alec Guinness, were absent, although James Robertson Justice made a small appearance as a tramp, using a Gaelic pseudonym; at the time he was a candidate in the General Election.

== Reception ==
The Monthly Film Bulletin wrote: "The plot of The Magnet is not allowed to develop naturally, but is carried through a whole series of improbable coincidences and misunderstandings. The attitude to children, too, is less natural than determinedly avuncular and whimsical, and Charles Frend has been unable to make William Fox (Johnny) appear very much of an actor. The same artificiality is apparent in the film's humour; the story departs from the adventures of the child to include a number of conventional jokes at the expense of such familiar targets as psychiatry, domestic difficulties, and the Labour Government. These defects and confusions in the script apart, the film might still have been knit together by strong direction. The Magnet, however, lacks both style and unity; even the location work seems flat, and it is only in some scenes on the beach that the picture really achieves a sense of atmosphere."

The Daily Film Renter wrote: "Simple? Yes. Funny? Very. Ingenuous? Yes. Well directed? – a bit uneven maybe, but it goes with the boisterous open-air swing that made Hue and Cry a stand-out laugh raiser. William Fox, a masculine fairheaded snip, with an air of misleading innocence, is a cinch in the role which is in the direct line of succession to the "William" stories, though not perhaps, so clean cut. Rivalling his brilliantly natural performance is the Liverpool dead-end kid, played by Keith Robinson, whose favourite retort 'You're a Liar' gets an audience roar every time he says it. The necessary long-suffering parents are beautifully understated by Kay Walsh and Stephen Murray. The Merseyside settings are particularly effective."

Picturegoer wrote: "Ealing Studios has a definite find in William Fox, the boy who plays the lead in this slight, but wholly convincing tale about the spirited young son of a psychiatrist. ... Stephen Murray is competent as his psychiatrist father. Good support comes from the rest of the cast. Delightful, naive boyhood sequences make this a very enjoyable little picture. It drags at times, but there's always plenty of interest in young William Fox."

Picture Show wrote: "Refreshing, amusing and friendly comedy of a small boy's troubles, imaginary and real, after cheating another boy out of a coveted magnet. Delightfully acted and imaginatively directed."

Leslie Halliwell described it as a "very mild Ealing comedy, not really up to snuff".

In British Sound Films: The Studio Years 1928–1959 David Quinlan rated the film as "average", writing: "Slow picture has some charm, is finally too improbable."

The British Film Institute's reviewer criticised it as "somewhat burdened by cumbersome moralising and too many credibility-stretching coincidences and misunderstandings" and described it as "an attempt to revisit the success of Clarke's earlier Hue and Cry".

Channel 4 described it as "a mild-mannered affair and the comedy gives way to a decidedly poignant conclusion".

The film was a box office disappointment.
