= Flora (spread) =

Brand of spread

- Product type: Spread
- Current owner: Flora Food Group (worldwide); Siqalo Foods (southern Africa)
- Related brands: Becel
- Markets: Global
- Previous owners: Unilever
- Website: www.flora.com

Flora is a brand of spread produced by Flora Food Group (except in southern Africa where it is produced by Siqalo Foods, a subsidiary of Remgro). The original manufacturer Unilever came up with the brand after having been asked by medical professionals to develop a healthier alternative to traditional margarines, lard and butter.

== History ==
Flora was developed by a Lever Bros scientific development team headed by Terence O'Neill. It was originally a partially hydrogenated sunflower oil-based spread, different from the current preparation.

The company now markets the product as a fully plant-based vegan product.

== Environmental consequences ==
Flora contents used to include palm oil. The global demand for palm oil is blamed for the loss of tropical hardwood forests which are being cleared for palm oil plantations. This clearance leads to the destruction of orangutan habitat in places such as Borneo and Sumatra.

Flora has stated on its website that they are concerned about the environmental consequence of its use of palm oil and has vowed to continue procuring all its palm oil from certified sustainable sources.

In October 2023, the recipe in the UK and all of Europe was changed for the entire range to omit palm oil and dairy and the packaging will be packaged in the same style as the company’s Flora Plant B+tter product.

== Sponsorships ==
Flora were the primary sponsors of the London Marathon from 1996 to 2009. In 2010, the sponsorship was taken over by Virgin Money.

== See also ==
- Becel
- List of spreads
