= Flora Food Group =

Dutch food company

Flora Food Group B.V.
- Formerly: Upfield B.V. (2018–2024)
- Type: Private
- Industry: Consumer goods
- Predecessors: Margarine Unie; Unilever's spread division
- Founded: 2018; 8 years ago (by spin-off)
- Founders: Samuel van den Bergh
- Headquarters: Amsterdam, Netherlands
- Area served: Worldwide
- Key people: David Haines (CEO)
- Products: Margarines, spreads
- Owner: Kohlberg Kravis Roberts
- Website: florafoodgroup.com

Flora Food Group B.V. is a Dutch food company owning multiple brands of margarine, food spreads, and plant-based foods, including Flora and Blue Band. It states that it is the largest plant-based consumer packaged goods company in the world, operating in 95 countries.

The company was spun off under the name Upfield from Unilever and purchased by investment firm Kohlberg Kravis Roberts (KKR) in 2018 for US$8.04 billion.

== History ==
Margarine was one of the first products sold by the company that would merge into Unilever. Antoon Jurgens of Oss, Netherlands, acquired the patent for making margarine from its inventor Hippolyte Mège-Mouriès in 1871. Through a series of mergers Jurgens' company became Margarine Unie in 1927 and then Unilever in 1929. Since that time, Unilever has added other margarine and food spread brands.

Although the food spreads division of Unilever maintained a robust profit margin, in the 21st century sales declined as many consumers switched to butter. In the five years leading to 2014, sales of margarine fell 6%, while sales of butter rose 7%.

Following a February 2017 takeover attempt by Kraft Heinz, Unilever chief executive Paul Polman made a pledge to investors to boost returns. In April of the same year, Unilever put the margarine and spreads division up for sale with the intention of returning the net cash from the sale to shareholders.

Original logo as Upfield

The sale sparked a bidding war among buyout firms including Apollo Global Management, CVC Capital Partners, Clayton, Dubilier & Rice, and Bain Capital. According to Bloomberg, it was the biggest-leveraged buyout in Europe in 2017. In December 2017, Unilever accepted an offer of €6.8bn from investment firm KKR. The purchase, which was completed in July 2018, was funded by European and North American private equity funds that are under KKR's control. The brands in the sale represented about 7% of Unilever's global business.

In January 2020 they purchased Violife, a brand of plant-based cheese.

Following falling margarine sales as consumers switched to butter, since summer 2020 the company focused more on the "plant-based" market, also claiming sustainability, to increase sales. The Group also announced it would invest €50 million in a facility for research and development on plant-based products, to be opened at the end of 2021.

The company renamed Upfield to Flora Food Group in September 2024.

== Leadership ==
David Haines, non-executive director of tobacco company Imperial Brands, was appointed CEO in July 2018. Current members of the Executive Committee are listed on the Upfield website.

== Products and operations ==
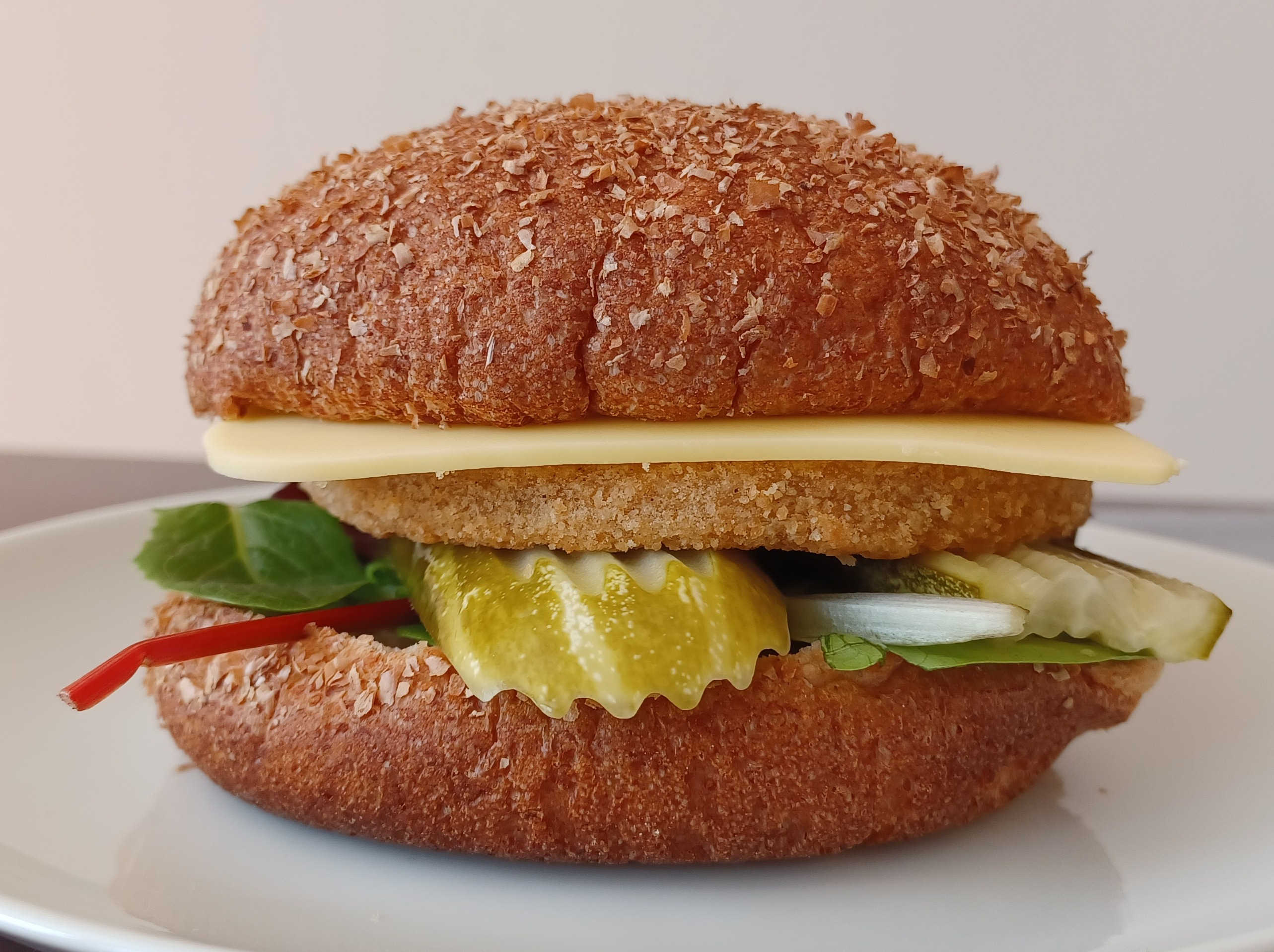
A veggieburger with Violife vegan cheese

Flora Food Group's notable brands include:

- Astra, cooking margarine (France)
- Flora, a margarine
- Violife, a vegan cheese range based in Thessaloniki, Greece
- Country Crock, margarines and spreads
- Rama, a margarine and cooking cream brand (Germany)
- Blue Band, margarines, and cheese and vegetable fat spreads
- I Can't Believe It's Not Butter!, a vegetable oil-based spread
- Becel, plant-based margarines
  - ProActiv, a Becel sub-brand
- Lätta, a margarine brand in Sweden and Germany
- Bertolli is a brand of Italian food products produced by multiple companies around the world with the trademark owned by Mizkan Holdings; Upfield produces a Bertolli olive oil spread range
- Elmlea, a range of buttermilk and vegetable oil blends sold as cream alternatives
- Fruit d'Or, margarine
- Planta Fin, margarine
  - Planteiga, a Planta sub-brand (Portugal)
- Stork (margarine)
- Delma, a margarine brand
- Minyak Samin Cap Onta (Indonesia only)
- Frytol, solid vegetable oil (Indonesia only)
- Tulipãn, plant-based magarines (Spain)
- Tulicreme, chocolate spread (Portugal)
- Vaqueiro, a margarine and cooking cream brand (Portugal)

In southern Africa, Remgro-owned Siqalo Foods, rather than Upfield, holds the rights to several of these brands.

After Upfield was spun off from Unilever in 2018, the Purfleet-on-Thames factory was closed, making 200 employees redundant. Underperformance and excessive costs were said by the company to be the reason for the closing of the factory.

In June 2020 it was made public that Upfield were to offshore its factory in Helsingborg, Sweden, with 80 employees notified of termination. The manufacture of Upfield's cheese & dairy products was scheduled to move to a factory in Kleve, Germany by February 2021. On 19 February 2025, it was revealed by local Swedish newspaper Helsingborgs Dagblad that the Helsingborg factory was set to close after nearly 50 years of operation following a decision to offshore the remainder of the productions to other European factories. The factory had been producing margarine products such as Lätta, Becel, and Flora since its opening in 1968. 62 employees were directly affected following the decision to close the factory. At its peak, the facility employed around 500 people, making it one of Helsingborg's larger workplaces.

Buttermilk was added to now non-vegan UK production of Flora Buttery in 2020. It was then again removed in October 2023, along with Palm Oil.

In March 2021 Upfield announced that the factory in Rotterdam would close in mid-2022.

In November 2021 Upfield bought Unilever's production factory in Cali, Colombia, producing Rama, Violife and Blue Band.
