= Hein Schumacher =

Dutch businessman

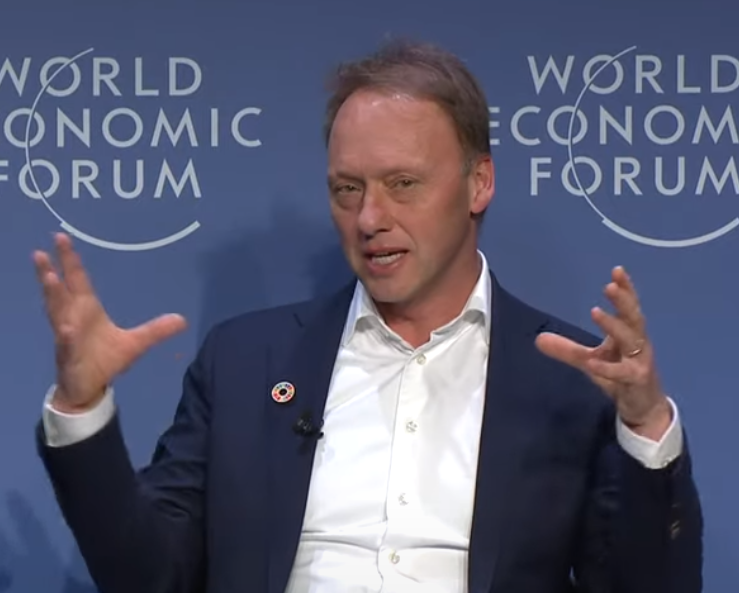
- Schumacher in 2024
- Born: 1 July 1971 (age 55); Breda, North Brabant, Netherlands
- Occupation: Business executive
- Title: CEO, Unilever
- Term: July 2023 – February 2025

Hein Schumacher (born 1 July 1971) is a Dutch businessman, and was the CEO of Unilever from 1 July 2023 to 1 March 2025.

== Early life ==
Schumacher was born on 1 July 1971 in Breda, Netherlands, and was raised in Rucphen. He studied political science and international relations at the University of Amsterdam, and later business administration at Vrije Universiteit Amsterdam.

== Career ==
Schumacher began his career at Unilever.

He was previously the CEO of the Dutch dairy co-operative FrieslandCampina from 2018 until 2023.

Before that, he worked at Heinz and was based in China for four years and had a stint at Ahold.

Schumacher has been a non-executive director of Unilever from October 2022 until his appointment as its CEO in July 2023. In February 2025, the Unilever board ousted Schumacher in favour of former finance chief, Fernando Fernandez.

In January 2026, Schumacher was appointed CEO of Barry Callebaut AG.

== Personal life ==
Schumacher is married with three children. He is an avid equestrian.

== Period at FrieslandCampina ==
In the period 2018 to 2023, FrieslandCampina faced several challenges including the COVID-19 pandemic, the Nitrogen crisis in the Netherlands and its relation to intensive farming, the Russo-Ukrainian war, and increasing competition for infant formula in the Asian Market.

Under Schumacher, FrieslandCampina executed structural reorganisation, plans to improve sustainability of dairy farms, and innovation and specialization of infant nutrition. Net income increased during this period.

In this period, FrieslandCampina also made efforts to improve sustainability by adhering to sustainable certifications, increasing the amount of recycled packaging, pilots with Anaerobic digestion of manure, and the introduction of entirely plant-based products, although Schumacher erroneously claimed that fully plant-based diets are less sustainable than diets including dairy and meat.
