= Country Crock =

American food brand

Shedd's Country Crock
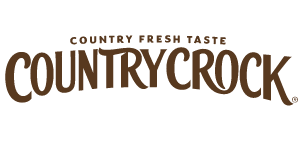
- Industry: Food
- Founded: 1945; 81 years ago
- Products: Margarine, spreads, side dishes, mashed potatoes, pasta
- Owner: Flora Food Group

Country Crock is a US food brand owned by Flora Food Group. It was originally used for spreads such as margarine (and cheese for a limited time), but later extended to side dishes, particularly mashed potatoes and pasta, made by Hormel under license.

The original Shedd's brand was a product of Shedd-Bartush Foods based in Detroit. It made and marketed margarine (beginning in 1945) and Shedd's peanut butter as well as salad dressing and prune juice. It merged in 1959 with Beatrice Foods before they sold the Shedd's business to Unilever in 1984 following Beatrice's merger with Esmark. The peanut butter business was sold to Algood Food Company.

During the 1980s and 1990s, a series of commercials for the brand's margarine depicted a married couple sitting at their dinner table while talking about the spread, with only their hands being seen. The voice of the wife was provided by Casey DeFranco while the husband's voice was provided by actor Jack Riley, who played Elliot Carlin on The Bob Newhart Show.

In July 2015, Shedd's Country Crock changed the recipe to remove preservatives and artificial flavors.

In 2022, Country Crock was the subject of a class-action lawsuit alleging that the company misled consumers with its labeling and advertising.
