= Blue Band (brand) =

Brand of margarine and spread

- Product type: Butter
- Current owner: Flora Food Group (worldwide); Siqalo Foods (southern Africa)
- Markets: International
- Previous owners: Unilever

Blue Band (known as Rama in Poland, Germany, Hungary, Romania, Slovenia, Croatia and Czech Republic) is a brand of margarine, cheese spreads, and vegetable fat spreads. Originally a Dutch brand developed by Van den Bergh it remains widely available in Germany, where it has been sold since 1924. It is produced by Flora Food Group except in southern Africa, and by Remgro-owned Siqalo Foods in southern Africa.

== History ==
Blue Band was developed as a premium quality margarine.
