= Unilever =

British multinational consumer goods company

Unilever PLC
- Logo used since May 2004

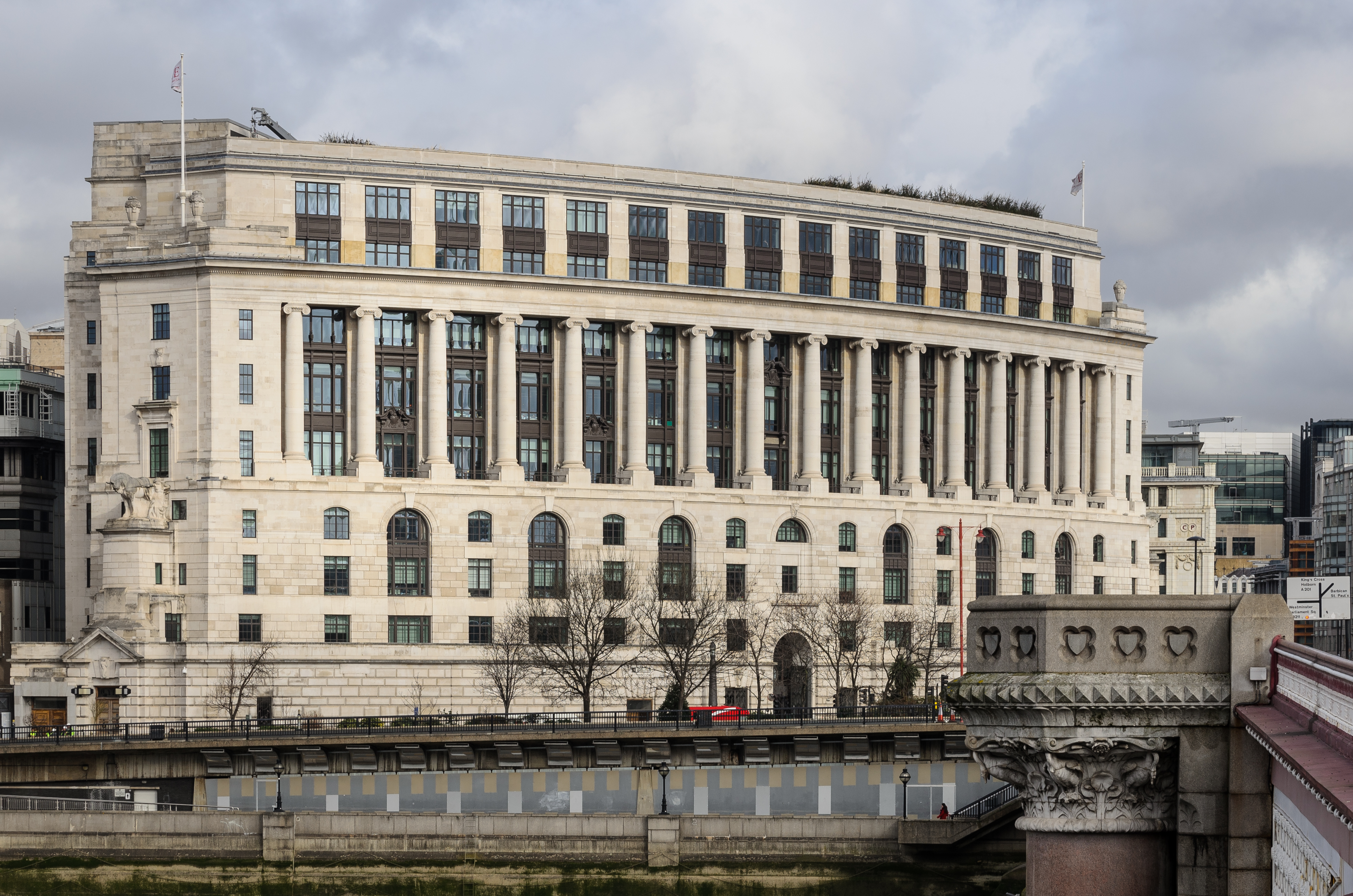
- Unilever House in London
- Type: Public
- Traded as: LSE: ULVR; Euronext Amsterdam: UNA; NYSE: UL (ADR); FTSE 100 component
- ISIN: GB00B10RZP78
- Industry: Consumer goods
- Predecessors: Lever Brothers; Margarine Unie
- Founded: 1930; 96 years ago
- Founders: Anton Jurgens; William Hulme Lever; Samuel van den Bergh
- Headquarters: Unilever House, London, England, United Kingdom
- Area served: Worldwide
- Key people: Ian Meakins (chair); Fernando Fernández (CEO)
- Products: List: Foods; Condiments; Baby food; Instant noodles; Pharmaceutical and consumer healthcare products; Breakfast cereals; Cleaning agents; Water and air purifiers; Pet food; Toothpaste; Bottled water; Soft drinks; Beauty products; Personal care
- Brands: List of Unilever brands
- Revenue: ▼€50.503 billion (2025)
- Operating income: ▲€9.037 billion (2025)
- Net income: ▲€10.011 billion (2025)
- Total assets: ▼€70.471 billion (2025)
- Total equity: ▼€17.587 billion (2025)
- Number of employees: 96,000 (2026)
- Website: unilever.com

Unilever PLC (/ˈjuːniˌliːvər/) is a British multinational consumer packaged goods company headquartered in London, England. It was founded in 1930 following the merger of Dutch margarine producer Margarine Unie with British soap maker Lever Brothers.

The company's products include baby food, beauty products, cleaning agents, healthcare and hygiene products, and toothpaste. It is the largest producer of soap in the world, and its products are available in over 190 countries.

The company is organised into four main business groups: Beauty & Wellbeing, Personal Care, Home Care, and Nutrition. It has research and development facilities in China, India, the Netherlands, Pakistan, the United Kingdom, and the United States.

In the 1930s, Unilever acquired the United Africa Company. In the second half of the 20th century, the company increasingly diversified from being a maker of products made of oils and fats, and expanded its operations worldwide. It has made numerous corporate acquisitions, including Lipton (1971), Brooke Bond (1984), Pond's (1987), Colman's (1995), Hellmann's (2000), Ben & Jerry's (2000), SlimFast (2000), Knorr (2000), Alberto-Culver (2010), Dollar Shave Club (2016), and Pukka Herbs (2017). Unilever divested its speciality chemicals businesses to Imperial Chemical Industries in 1997. In the 2010s, under the leadership of Paul Polman, the company gradually shifted its focus towards health and beauty brands and away from food brands that showed slow growth. Having divested its various global foods businesses in the 2010s and 2020s, the company is now focused on health and personal care products globally.

Unilever is listed on the London Stock Exchange with secondary listings on the Euronext Amsterdam and the New York Stock Exchange and is a constituent of the FTSE 100 Index.

== History ==
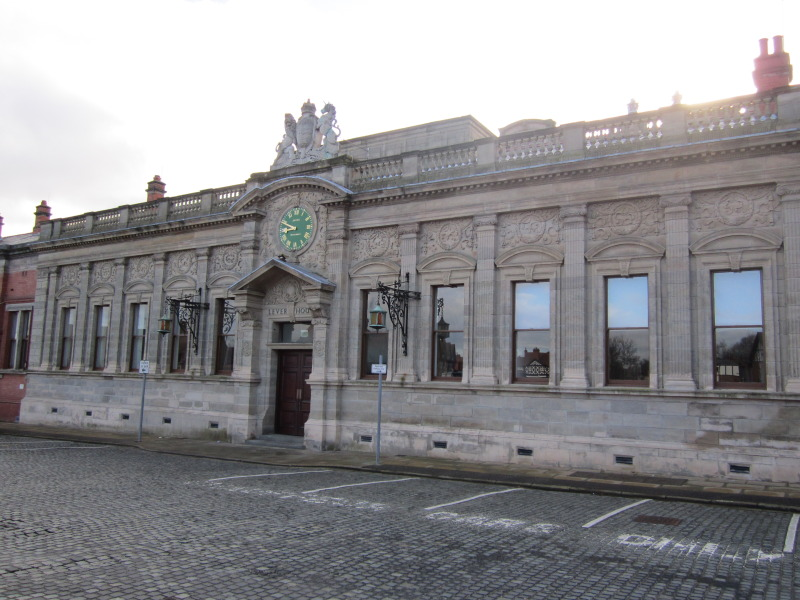
Lever House in Port Sunlight, United Kingdom, the former headquarters of Lever Brothers

=== 1930–1940 ===
Unilever was formed by a merger of Dutch Margarine Unie and British soapmaker Lever Brothers in 1930, with the name of Unilever a blend word of the name of both companies.

In the 1930s, the business grew, and new ventures were launched in Africa and Latin America. During this time, Unilever acquired the United Africa Company, created from a merger of the African & Eastern Trade Corporation and the Royal Niger Company, which oversaw British trade interests in present-day Nigeria during the colonial era. The Nazi occupation of Europe during the Second World War meant that Unilever was unable to reinvest its capital into Europe, so it instead acquired new businesses in the United Kingdom and the United States.

In 1943, it acquired T. J. Lipton, a majority stake in Frosted Foods (owner of the Birds Eye brand in the United Kingdom) and Batchelors Peas, one of the largest vegetables canners in the United Kingdom. In 1944, Pepsodent was acquired.

In 1933, Unilever Indonesia was established in December as Lever Zeepfabrieken N.V. and had operations in Cikarang, West Java at Rungkut, East Java and North Sumatra.

=== 1941–1960 ===
After 1945, Unilever's American businesses (Lever Brothers and T.J. Lipton) began to decline. As a result, Unilever began to operate a "hands-off" policy towards the subsidiaries and left American management to its own devices.

Sunsilk was first launched in the United Kingdom in 1954. Dove was first launched in the US in 1957. Unilever took full ownership of Frosted Foods in 1957, which it renamed Birds Eye. The US-based Good Humor ice cream business was acquired in 1961. By the mid-1960s, laundry soap and edible fats still contributed around half of Unilever's corporate profits. However, a stagnant market for yellow fats (butter, margarine, and similar products) and increasing competition in detergents and soaps from Procter & Gamble forced Unilever to diversify. In 1971, Unilever acquired the British-based Lipton Ltd from Allied Suppliers. In 1978, National Starch was acquired for $487 million, marking the largest ever foreign-acquisition of a US company at that point.

=== 1961–1980 ===
By the end of the 1970s through acquisitions, Unilever had gained 30 per cent of the Western European ice cream market. In 1982, Unilever management decided to reposition itself from an unwieldy conglomerate to a more concentrated fast-moving consumer goods (FMCG) company.

In 1984, Unilever acquired Brooke Bond (maker of PG Tips tea) for £390 million in the company's first successful takeover. In 1986, Unilever strengthened its position in the world skin care market by acquiring Ponds (merged from Chesebrough Manufacturing and Pond's Creams), the maker of Ragú, Pond's, Aqua-Net, Cutex, and Vaseline in another hostile takeover. In 1989, Unilever bought Calvin Klein Cosmetics, Fabergé, and Elizabeth Arden, but the latter was later sold (in 2000) to FFI Fragrances.

=== 1981–2000 ===
In 1992, Unilever Ghana was established in July following a merger of UAC Ghana Limited and Lever Brothers Ghana Limited.

In 1993, Unilever acquired Breyers from Kraft, which made the company the largest ice cream manufacturer in the United States. In the same year, it acquired the Isaly Klondike Company, makers of Klondike bar, and Popsicle Industries.

In 1996, Unilever merged Elida Gibbs and Lever Brothers in its UK operations. It also purchased Helene Curtis, significantly expanding its presence in the United States shampoo and deodorant market. The purchase brought Unilever the Suave and Finesse hair-care product brands and Degree deodorant brand.

In 1997, Unilever sold its speciality chemicals division, including National Starch & Chemical, Quest, Unichema and Crosfield to Imperial Chemical Industries for £4.9 billion.

In 1998, Unilever established a sustainable agriculture programme.

In 2000, Unilever acquired the boutique mustard retailer Maille, Ben & Jerry's and SlimFast for £1.63 billion, Bestfoods for £13.4 billion. The Bestfoods acquisition increased Unilever's scale in foods in America, and added brands including Knorr, Marmite, Bovril, and Hellmann's to its portfolio. In exchange for European regulatory approval of the deal, Unilever divested itself of Oxo, Lesieur, McDonnells, Bla Band, Royco, and Batchelors.

=== 2001–2010 ===
Global employment at Unilever 2000–08 Black represents employment numbers in Europe, light grey represents the Americas and dark grey represents Asia and Africa. Between 2000 and 2008 Unilever reduced global workforce numbers by 41%, from 295,000 to 174,000. Notes: Europe figures for 2000–2003 are all Europe; from 2004 figures in black are Western Europe. For 2004–2008 figures for Asia and Africa include Eastern and Central Europe. Source: Unilever Annual Reports 2004, 2008

In 2001, Unilever split into two divisions: one for foods and one for home and personal care. In the United Kingdom, it merged its Lever Brothers and Elida Fabergé businesses as Lever Fabergé in January 2001.

In 2003, Unilever announced the sale of the Dalda brand in both India and Pakistan. In 2003, Bunge Limited acquired the Dalda brand from Hindustan Unilever Limited for reportedly under Rs. 1 billion. On 30 March 2004, Unilever Pakistan accepted an offer of Rs. 1.33 billion for the sale of its Dalda brand and related business of edible oils and fats to the newly incorporated company Dalda Foods (Pvt.) Limited.

In 2002, the company sold its speciality oils and fats division, known as Loders Croklaan, for RM814 million (€218.5 million) to IOI Corporation, a Kuala Lumpur, Malaysia–based oil palm company. As part of the deal, the Loders Croklaan name was maintained. Unilever sold the brands Mazola, Argo & Kingsfords, Karo, Golden Griddle, and Henri's, along with several of its Canadian brands, to ACH Food Companies, an American subsidiary of Associated British Foods.

In 2004, Unilever Bangladesh, established in 1964, changed its former name Lever Brothers Bangladesh Ltd to its present name in December. It is owned 60.4% by Unilever and 39.6% by the Government of Bangladesh.

In 2007, Unilever partnered with Rainforest Alliance to sustainably source all its tea.

In 2009, Unilever agreed to acquire the personal care business of Sara Lee Corporation, including brands such as Radox, Badedas and Duschdas. The Sara Lee acquisition was completed on 6 December 2010.

In 2010, Unilever acquired the Diplom-Is in Denmark, Unilever announced that it had entered into a definitive agreement to sell its consumer tomato products business in Brazil to Cargill, purchased Alberto-Culver, a maker of personal care and household products including Simple, VO5, Nexxus, TRESemmé, and Mrs. Dash, for US$3.7 billion. acquired EVGA's ice cream brands, which included Scandal, Variete and Karabola, and its distribution network in Greece, for an undisclosed amount.

=== 2011–2020 ===
In 2012, Unilever announced it would phase out the use of microplastics in the form of microbeads in their personal care products by 2015.

In 2014, Unilever agreed to acquire a majority stake in the China-based water purification company Qinyuan for an undisclosed price, acquired Talenti Gelato & Sorbetto, acquired Camay brand globally and the Zest brand outside of North America and the Caribbean from Procter & Gamble.

In 2015, Unilever acquired British niche skincare brand REN Skincare, This was followed in May 2015 by the acquisition of Kate Somerville Skincare. The company also acquired the Italian premium ice cream maker GROM for an undisclosed amount. Unilever also separated its food spreads business, including its Flora and I Can't Believe It's Not Butter! brands, into a standalone entity named Unilever Baking, Cooking and Spreading. The separation was first announced in December 2014 and was made in response to declining worldwide sales in that product category.

Unilever bought the United States–based startup company Dollar Shave Club for a reported $1 billion (£764 million) to compete in the male grooming market. On 16 August 2016, Unilever acquired Blueair, a Swedish supplier of mobile indoor air purification technologies. In July 2024, Blueair received a warning letter from the Federal Trade Commission concerning warranty restrictions related to use of certain replacement filters. In September 2016, Unilever acquired Seventh Generation Inc. for $700 million. On 16 December 2016, Unilever acquired Living Proof Inc, a hair care products business.

In 2017, significantly smaller Kraft Heinz made a $143-billion bid for Unilever. The deal was declined by Unilever. On 20 April 2017, Unilever acquired Sir Kensington's, a New York–based condiment maker. On 15 May 2017, the company acquired the personal care and home care brands of Quala, a Latin American consumer goods company. In June, the company acquired Hourglass, a colour cosmetics brand. In July, the company then announced that it had acquired the organic herbal tea business, Pukka Herbs. In September 2017, Unilever acquired Weis, an Australian ice cream business. Later that month Unilever acquired Remgro's interest in Unilever South Africa in exchange for the Unilever South Africa spreads business plus cash consideration. Even later that month, Unilever agreed to acquire Carver Korea, a skincare business brand of AHC in Northeast Asia, for $2.7 billion. In October 2017, Unilever acquired Brazilian natural and organic food business Mãe Terra. In November, Unilever announced an agreement to acquire the Tazo speciality tea brand from Starbucks. Later in November 2017, the company acquired Sundial Brands, a skincare company. In December 2017, Unilever acquired Schmidt's Naturals, a US natural deodorant and soap company. In December 2017, Unilever sold its margarine and spreads division to investment firm KKR for €6.8 billion. The sale was completed in July 2018, and the new company was named Upfield. Upfield's notable brands include Flora, Stork, I Can't Believe It's Not Butter, Rama, Country Crock, Becel, and Blue Band.

Unilever announced that to help tackle the global COVID-19 pandemic, it would contribute over €100 million through donations of soap, hand sanitiser, bleach and food.

=== Since 2021 ===
In April 2021, Unilever established a new stand-alone beauty business, Elida Beauty, which will own and manage the following brands: Brut, Brylcreem, Timotei, Q-tips, Noxema, TIGI, VO5, Toni & Guy, Matey, Moussel, Monsavon, Impulse, St Ives, Alberto Balsam, Badedas, Fissan, Pento, Pond's, Careess, Lever 2000, Williams, Elida, and Alberto.

In August 2021, Florida governor Ron DeSantis placed Unilever on a list of "Scrutinized Companies that Boycott Israel" because it had "no current plan to prevent Ben & Jerry's from terminating business activities in Israeli-controlled territories". The ice-cream brand has 90 days to stop engaging in "the BDS movement", or the state will no longer contract with the parent company Unilever or any of its subsidiaries.

In November 2021, Unilever agreed to sell most of its tea business under the Ekaterra division to investment firm CVC Capital Partners for €4.5 billion. This deal excluded the Unilever tea business in India, Indonesia and Nepal, and the Lipton Ice Tea joint-venture with PepsiCo. The deal was completed in summer 2022.

In December 2023, Unilever announced the company would sell Elida Beauty to Yellow Wood Partners, a private equity firm in the United States.

In March 2024, Unilever announced plans to spin off its ice cream unit, which makes among others, brands such as Magnum and Ben & Jerry's, into a standalone business starting in March 2024 and planned to complete by the end of 2025. The announcement was part of a cost-savings programme that would cut 7,500 jobs. In February 2025, Unilever announced that the ice cream unit would list on the Amsterdam stock market. The ice cream unit, later known as The Magnum Ice Cream Company, completed the demerger in November 2025.

In December 2024, the company announced the sale of food brand Unox and Zwan to Zwanenberg Food Group with the deal expected to be completed in 2026.

In June 2025, Unilever announced the acquisition of Dr. Squatch, an American personal care brand, for $1.5 billion from Summit Partners. The deal remains subject to regulatory and shareholder approval.

In March 2026, Unilever agreed to combine most of the remainder of its food business with spice maker McCormick & Company, creating a new sauces-to-spices company valued at more than $65 billion. Unilever shareholders were expected to own approximately 65% of the new company, and Unilever would also receive a one-time $15.7 billion cash payment. The deal excluded Unilever's food and tea businesses in India, Indonesia and Nepal, the Lipton Ice Tea joint-venture with PepsiCo, its Lifestyle Nutrition business, its Buavita business and the Colman's mustard manufacturer. The latter was originally part of the sale but it would be sold separately to avoid anti-competition issues.

== Corporate operations ==
=== Legal structure ===
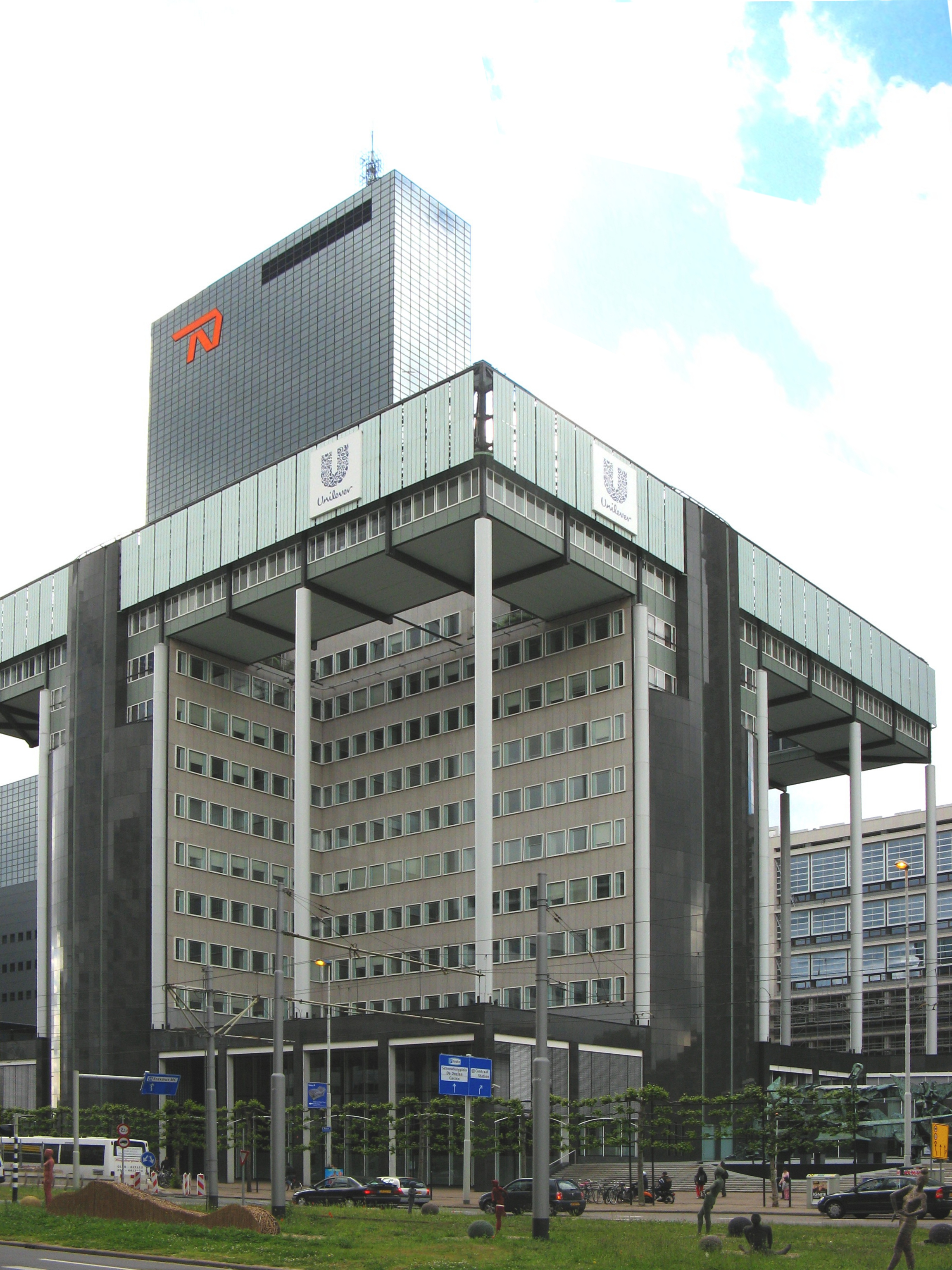
Former head office building of Unilever N.V. which now became the HQ for the merged group's food and refreshments division, Rotterdam

Unilever's registered office is at Port Sunlight in Merseyside, United Kingdom, and its head office at Unilever House in London. The company has been restructured several times, for example in 2018 and 2020 (see "history").

In 2018, Unilever announced its intention to simplify this structure by centralising the duality of legal entities and keeping just one headquarters in Rotterdam, abandoning the London head office. Business groups and staff would have been unaffected, as would the dual listing. On 5 October 2018 the group announced it would cancel the restructuring due to concern that the United Kingdom shareholders would lose value if the company fell out of the London FTSE100. A shareholder vote was planned to decide for the listing of a new Unilever Dutch entity, which would have seen Unilever dropping out of the FTSE 100 Index. When it appeared that the vote would fail, due to uncertainty over the Netherlands dividend tax, the scheme was cancelled on 5 October 2018.

In October 2018, the company acquired a 75% stake in the Italian personal-care business Equilibra and acquired the high-end, eco-friendly laundry and household cleaning products company The Laundress for an undisclosed sum. In 2018, UK recruitment website, Indeed, named Unilever as the United Kingdom's ninth best private sector employer based on millions of employee ratings and reviews.

In 2020, Unilever announced after review of its corporate structure, the company was to merge Unilever N.V. into Unilever PLC forming one holding company to be based in the United Kingdom. However, a Dutch exit tax plan required the company to reconsider this unification. In September 2020 Unilever's Dutch arm shareholders overwhelmingly voted for the N.V. to merge into the PLC. In October 2020, Unilever announced that 99% of shareholders in its UK arm agreed with the merger, i.e., voted to base the group in London. The completion of the unification was announced in November 2020. Since then there is one class of shares.

=== Senior management ===
In January 2019, Alan Jope succeeded Paul Polman as the chief executive officer. The chief financial officer, Graeme Pitkethly, is executive director. Jope will be proposed as joint executive director at Unilever's 2019 AGM.

Previously, Paul Polman was CEO for ten years, succeeding Patrick Cescau in 2009.

In November 2019, Unilever announced that Nils Andersen would be replacing Chairman Marijn Dekkers, who stepped down after three years in the role.

In January 2023, it announced Hein Schumacher as its new CEO, effective July 2023. In February 2025, Unilever announced Schumacher would step down on 31 May. He was replaced by Fernando Fernandez.

=== Gallery of global assets ===
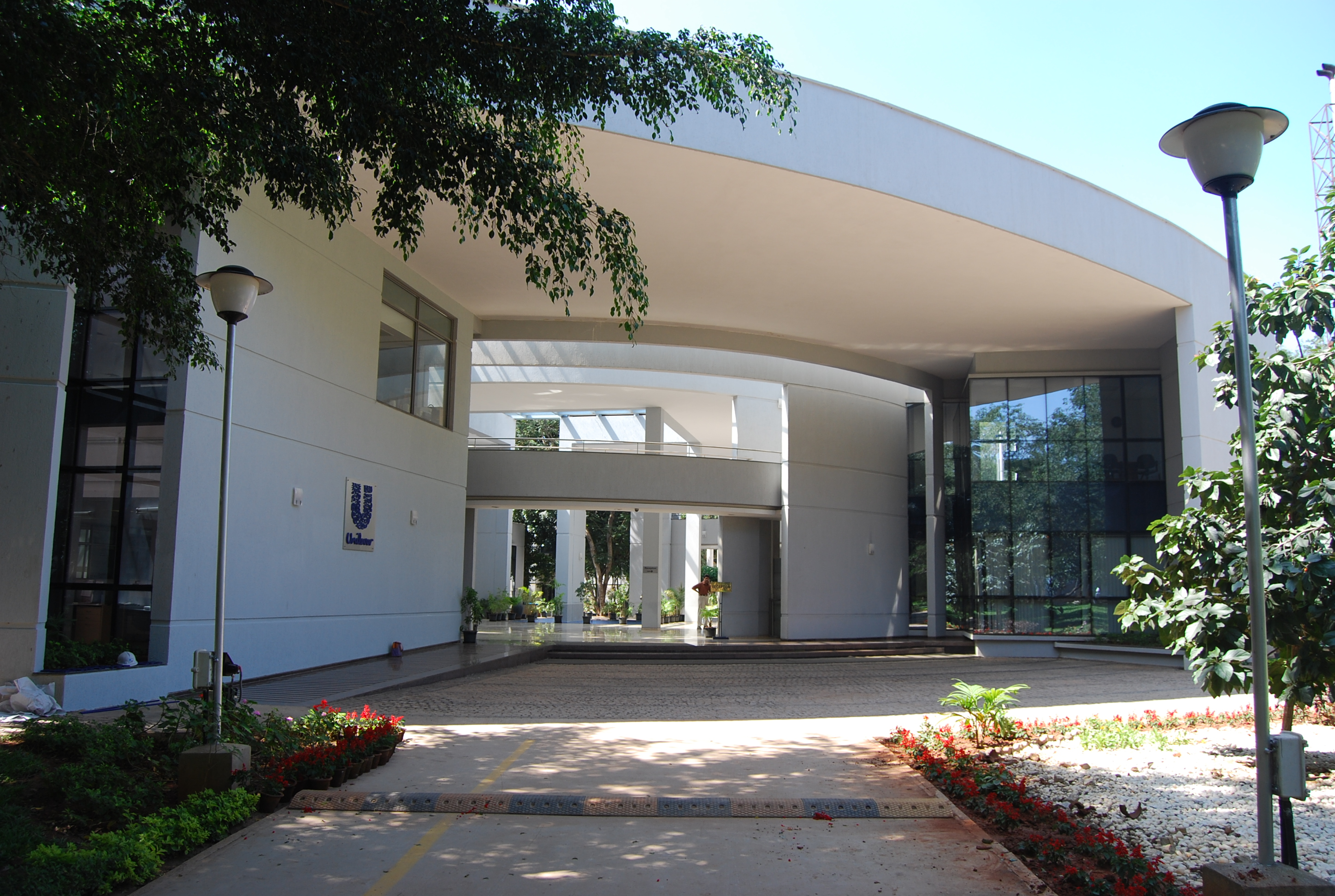
Unilever R&D Centre in Bangalore, India

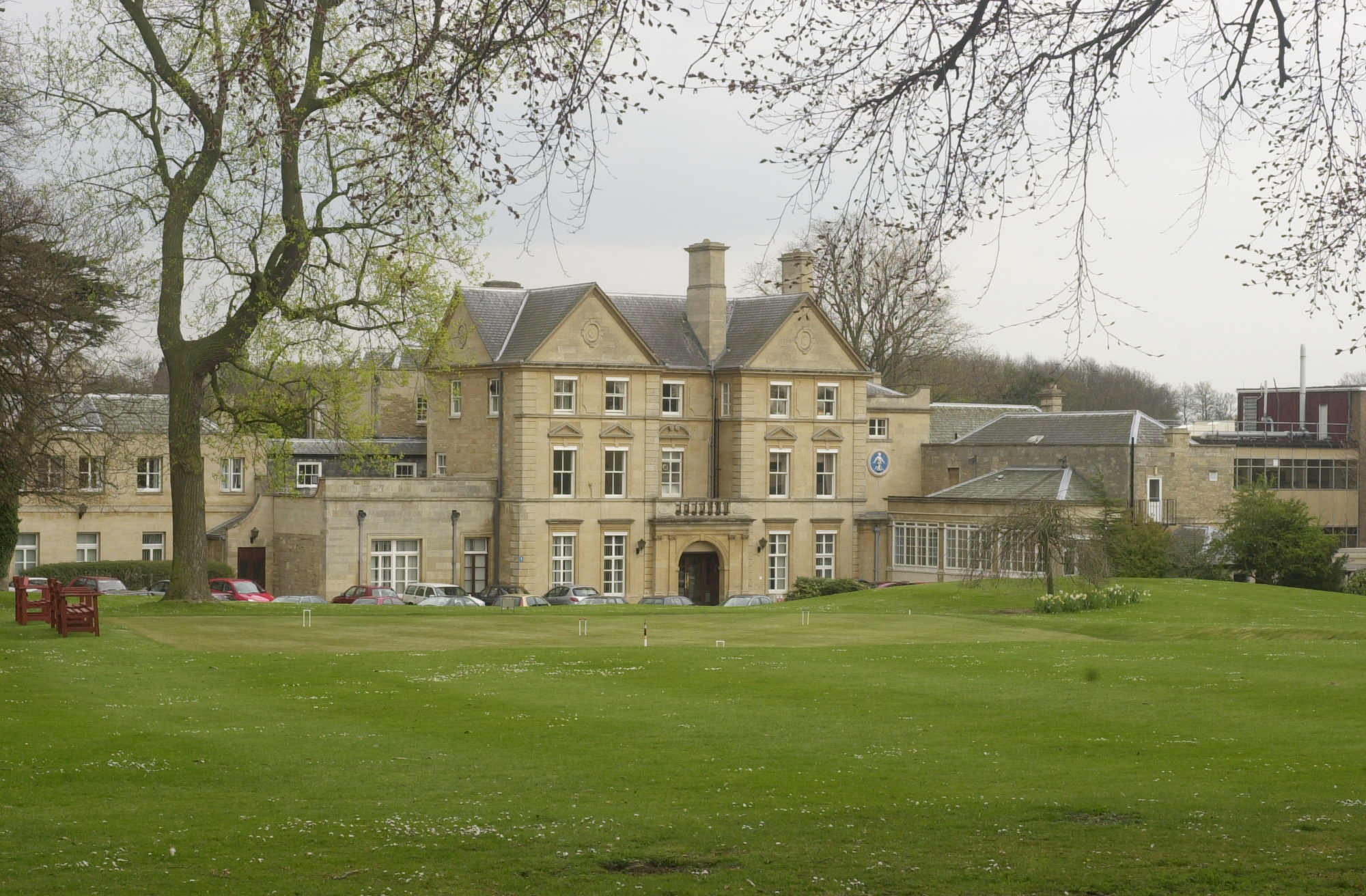
Unilever R&D Centre at Colworth House, Sharnbrook, United Kingdom

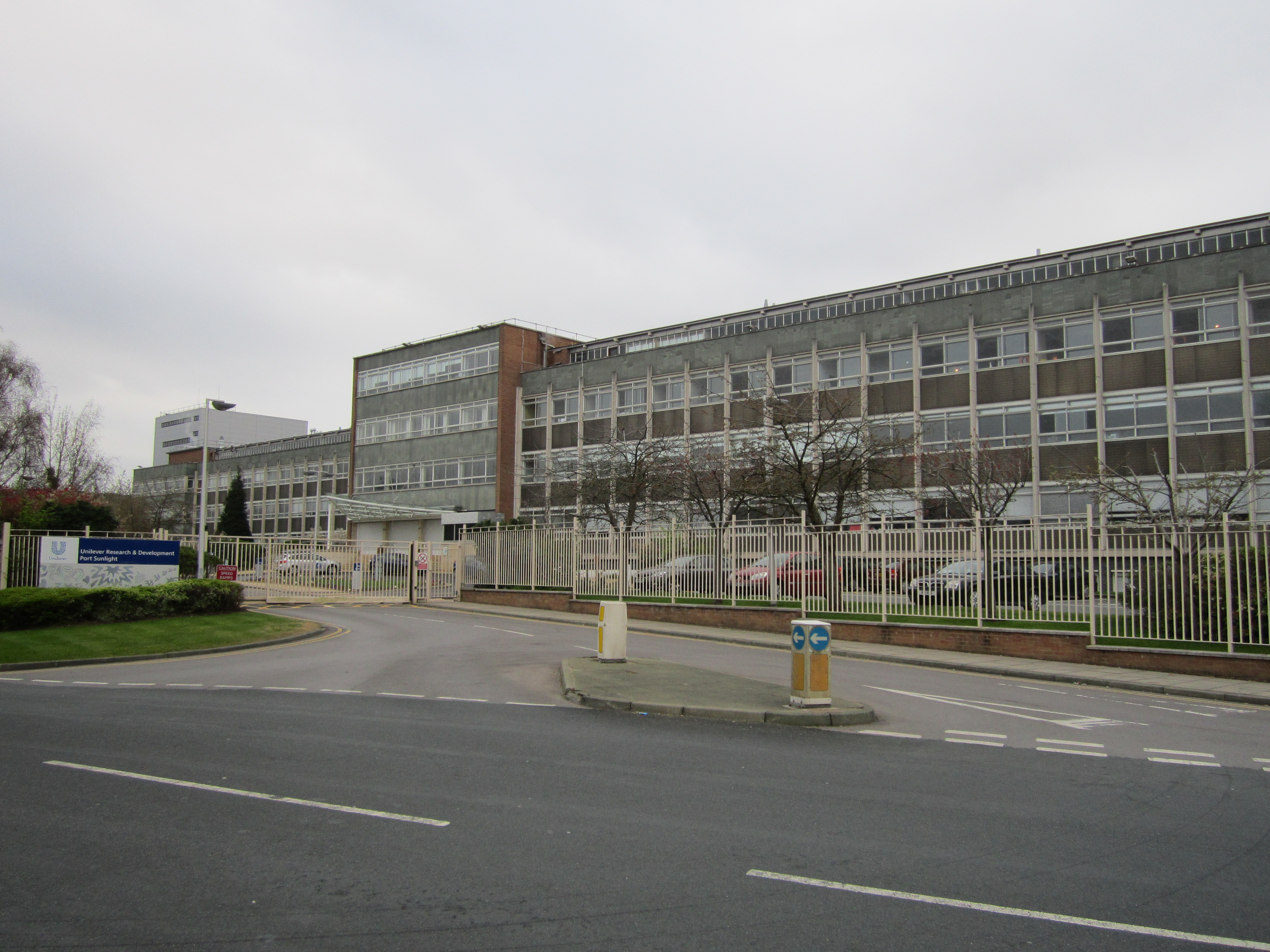
Unilever R&D Centre in Port Sunlight, United Kingdom

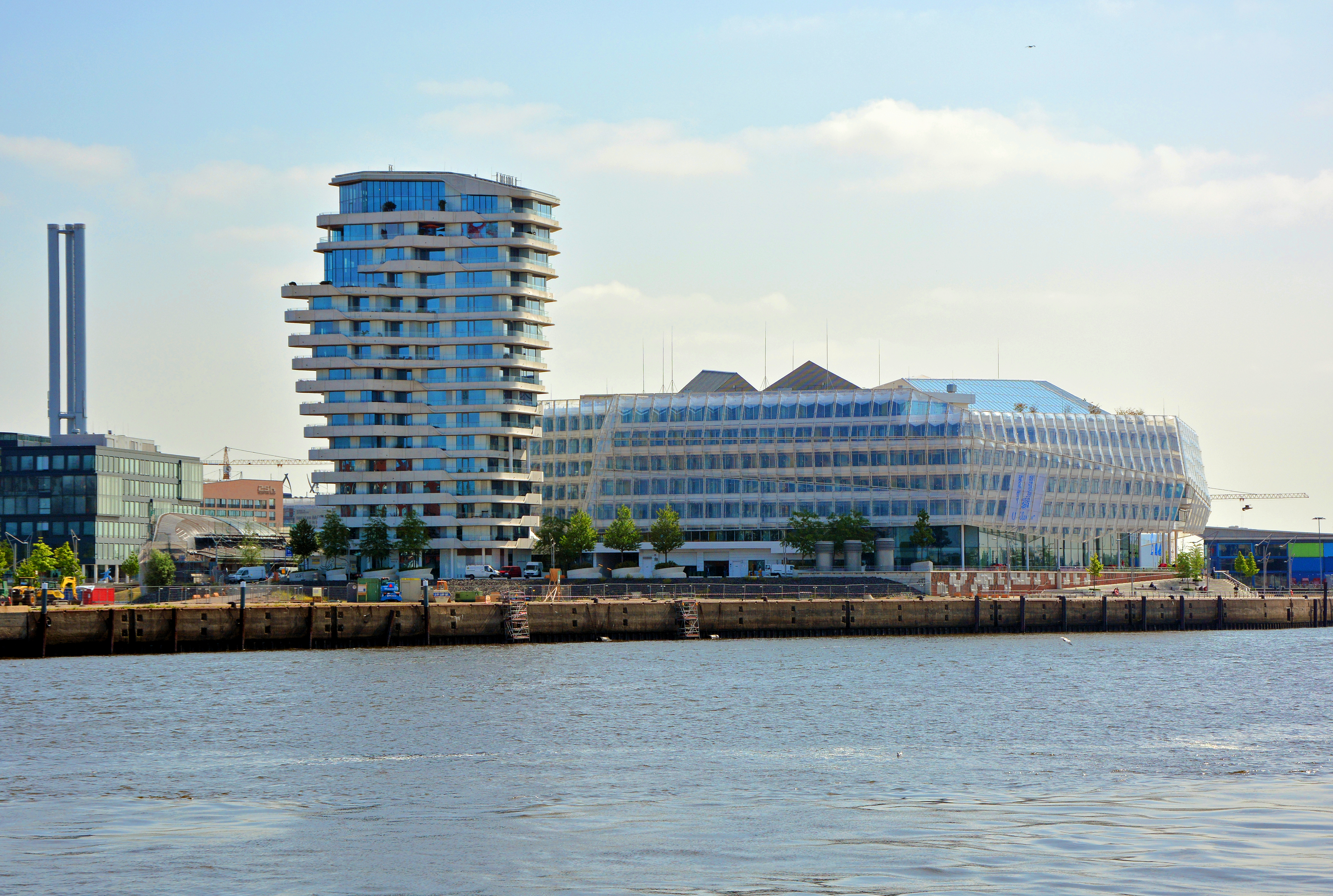
Unilever-Haus in Hamburg, Germany

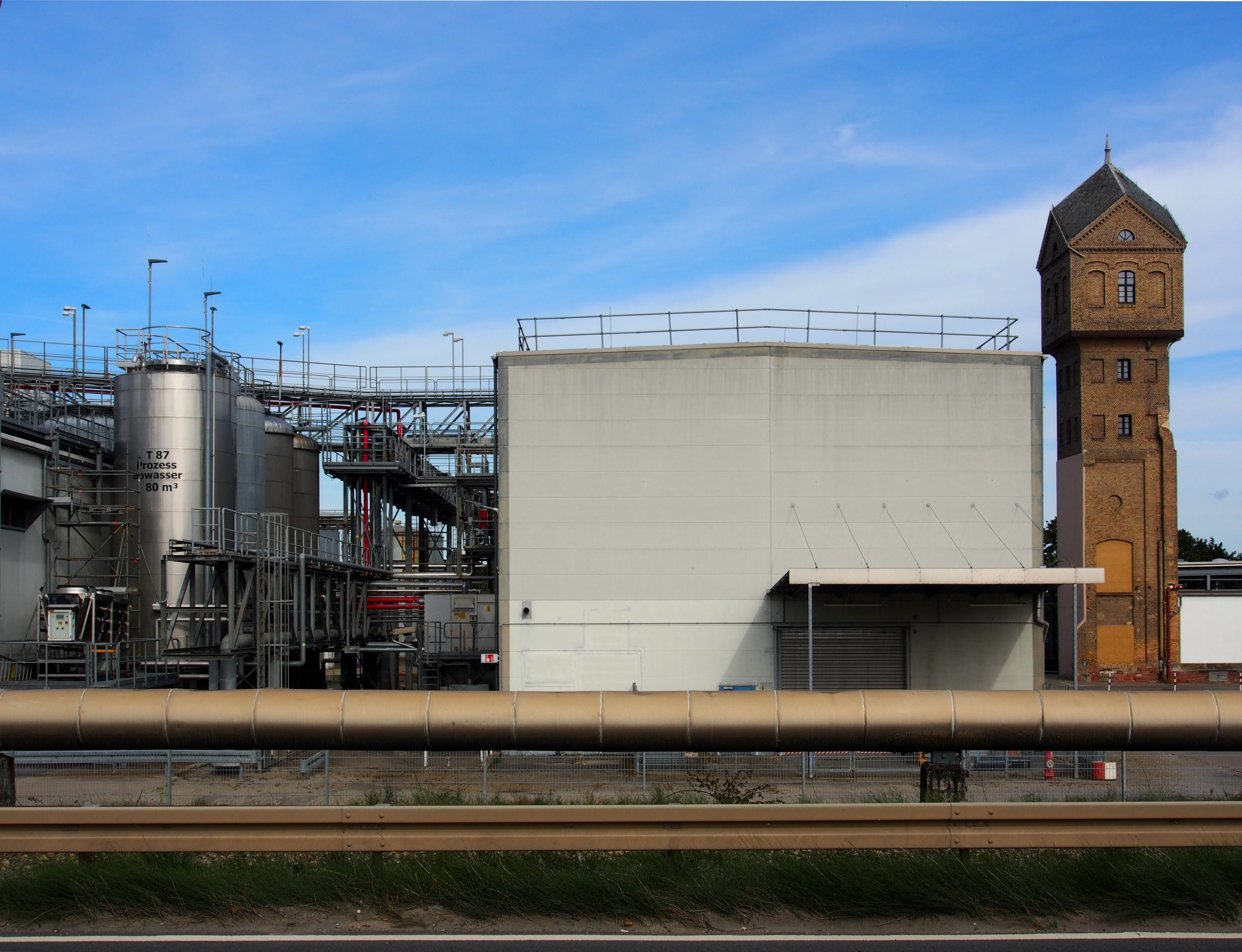
Soap factory in Mannheim, Germany

=== Financial data ===
Financial data in € billions
Year	2011	2012	2013	2014	2015	2016	2017	2018	2019	2020	2021	2022	2023	2024	2025
Revenue	46.467	51.324	49.797	48.436	53.272	52.713	53.715	50.982	51.980	50.724	52.444	60.073	59.604	60.761	50.503
Net Income	4.252	4.480	4.842	5.171	4.909	5.184	6.053	9.389	5.625	5.581	6.621	8.269	7.140	6.369	10.011
Assets	29.583	30.351	28.131	28.385	32.279	35.873	37.108	39.684	64.806	67.659	75.095	77.821	75.266	79.750	70.471
Employees	171,000	172,000	174,000	173,000	169,000	169,000	165,000	158,000	153,000	155,000	149,000	148,000	127,000	128,000	125,000

=== Operations ===
The three markets of the United States, China and India account for over one third of turnover.

Thirteen brands account for over half of sales.

Unilever Australasia is the Australian and New Zealand subsidiary company of Unilever.

== Brands ==
Unilever's largest brands include Dove, Axe / Lynx, Lifebuoy, Lux, Persil / Omo, Rexona / Sure, Sunlight, and Sunsilk.

== Advertising ==
=== Logo ===
In 1930, the logo of Unilever was in a sans-serif typeface and all-caps. The current Unilever corporate logo was introduced in 2004 and was designed by Wolff Olins, a brand consultancy agency and Miles Newlyn. The U shape is now made up of 25 distinct symbols, each icon representing one of the company's sub-brands or its corporate values. The brand identity was developed around the idea of "adding vitality to life".

=== Dove ===
Dove describes itself as being dedicated to "help ... women develop a positive relationship with the way they look – helping them raise their self-esteem and realize their full potential". Dove uses advertising to display messages of positive self-esteem. In September 2004 Dove created a Real Beauty campaign, focusing predominately on women of all shapes and colour. Later in 2007, this campaign furthered itself to include women of all ages. This campaign consisted mostly of advertisements, shown on television and popularised by the internet. Dove fell under scrutiny from the general public as they felt the Dove advertisements described the opinion that cellulite was still unsightly and that women's ageing process was something for which to be ashamed.

=== Axe/Lynx ===
Axe, known as Lynx in the United Kingdom, the Republic of Ireland, Australia and New Zealand, is a toiletries brand marketed towards young men between the ages of 16 and 24. Its marketing is a "tongue-in-cheek take on the 'mating game'", suggesting that women are instantly drawn to men who use the products. Unlike Dove's long-running beauty campaign, Lynx advertising often creates mini-series of advertisements based around a singular product rather than communicating an overarching idea. Using images the company knows it will receive complaints garners the brand more free publicity and notoriety, often through controversy. A wide variety of these adverts have been banned in countries around the world. In 2012, Lynx's Clean Balls advert was banned. In 2011, in the United Kingdom, Lynx's shower gel campaign was banned.

Both advertising campaigns make stark comparisons between how women and their sexuality are portrayed in advertising and sales efficiency. Lynx commonly portrays women as hypersexual, flawless and stereotypically attractive who are aroused by men, of all ages and stature, because of their use of the Lynx product.

=== Social media advertising ===
On 26 June 2020, Unilever said it would halt advertising to US customers on social media giants Facebook, Instagram, and Twitter until at least the end of 2020 following a campaign started by various American civil-rights groups, such as the Anti-Defamation League and the NAACP, protesting Facebook's policies on hate speech and misinformation named "Stop Hate For Profit". However, Unilever did not formally sign on to the campaign. The company cited their "Responsibility Framework and the polarized atmosphere in the U.S." and said that "continuing to advertise on these platforms at this time would not add value to people and society".

Later that year in December, Unilever revealed it would resume advertising on Facebook and its affiliated platforms, stating that Facebook had made enough progress in changing their management to continue advertising with them. Executive vice-president of global media for the company, Luis Di Como, released a clarifying statement: "We are encouraged by the commitments the platforms are making to build healthier environments for consumers, brands and society in alignment with the principles of the Global Alliance for Responsible Media. This is why we plan to end our social media investment pause in the U.S. in January. We will continue to reassess our position as necessary."

In 2026, Unilever expanded its influencer-led marketing strategy, building a global network of approximately 300,000 creators as part of a shift toward social media-driven advertising. The company indicated that the move reflected a transition away from traditional large-scale campaigns toward continuous, creator-led digital engagement. A company representative noted that the strategy focuses on leveraging decentralized content creation to better connect with consumers across platforms.

=== Corporate sponsorship ===
From 2000 to 2012 Unilever sponsored the Turbine Hall commissions at Tate Modern, which became known as The Unilever Series.

== Competition ==
Unilever's largest international competitors are Nestlé and Procter & Gamble.

== Controversies ==
=== Price-fixing ===
In April 2011, Unilever was fined €104 million by the European Commission for establishing a price-fixing cartel for washing powder in Europe, along with Procter & Gamble and Henkel.

In 2016, Unilever and Procter & Gamble were both fined by Autorité de la concurrence in France for price-fixing on personal hygiene products.

=== Hampton Creek lawsuit ===
In November 2014, Unilever filed a lawsuit against rival Hampton Creek. In the suit, Unilever claimed that Hampton Creek was "seizing market share" and the losses were causing Unilever "irreparable harm". Unilever used standard of identity regulations in claiming that Hampton Creek's Just Mayo products are falsely advertised because they don't contain eggs. The Washington Post headline on the suit read "Big Food's Weird War Over The Meaning of Mayonnaise." The Los Angeles Times began its story with "Big Tobacco, Big Oil, now Big Mayo?" A Wall Street Journal writer described that "Giant corporation generates huge quantities of free advertising and brand equity for tiny rival by suing it." In December 2014, Unilever dropped the claim.

=== Pressuring media to promote skin whiteners ===
Kinita Shenoy, an editor of the Sri Lanka edition of Cosmopolitan, refused to promote skin whiteners for a brand of Unilever. Unilever put pressure on Shenoy and asked Cosmopolitan to fire her.

=== Violence against striking workers ===
In 2019, security forces hired by Unilever attacked workers that were peacefully picketing at a Unilever facility in Durban in South Africa. Workers were shot at with rubber bullets and paint balls and pepper sprayed while attempting to walk to their cars parked on the premises. Four workers were seriously injured.

=== Mercury contamination ===
In 2001, a mercury thermometer factory operated by the Indian subsidiary of Unilever in the South Indian hilltown of Kodaikanal was shut down by state regulators after the company was caught dumping toxic mercury wastes in a densely populated part of town. By the company's own admissions, more than 2 tonnes of mercury were discharged into Kodaikanal's environment. A 2011 Government of India study on workers' health concluded that many workers suffered from illnesses caused by workplace exposure to mercury. The scandal opened up a series of issues in India such as corporate liability, corporate accountability and corporate negligence.

In March 2016, Unilever reached an out of court settlement (for an undisclosed amount) with 591 ex-workers of the unit who had sued the company for knowingly exposing them to the toxic element.

=== Palm oil ===
In 2014, Unilever was criticised by Greenpeace for causing deforestation. In 2008, Greenpeace UK criticised the company for buying palm oil from suppliers that were damaging Indonesia's rainforests. By 2008, Indonesia was losing 2% of its remaining rainforest each year, having the fastest deforestation rate of any country. The United Nations Environmental Programme stated that palm oil plantations are the leading cause of deforestation in Indonesia.

Furthermore, Indonesia was the 14th largest emitter of greenhouse gases, largely due to the destruction of rainforests for the palm oil industry, which contributed to 4% of global green house gas emissions. According to Greenpeace, palm oil expansion was taking place with little oversight from central or local government as procedures for environmental impact assessment, land-use planning and ensuring a proper process for development of concessions were neglected. Plantations that were off-limits, by law, for palm oil plantations were being established as well as the illegal use of fire to clear forest areas was commonplace.

Unilever, as a founding member of the Roundtable on Sustainable Palm Oil (RSPO), responded by publicising its plan to obtain all of its palm oil from sources that are certified as sustainable by 2015. It claims to have met this goal in 2012 and is encouraging the rest of the industry to become 100% sustainable by 2020.

In Côte d'Ivoire, one of Unilever's palm oil suppliers was accused of clearing forest for plantations, an activity that threatened a primate species, Miss Waldron's red colobus. Unilever intervened to halt the clearances pending the results of an environmental assessment.

According to an Amnesty International report published in 2016, Unilever's palm oil supplier Wilmar International profited from child labour and forced labour. Some workers were extorted, threatened or not paid for work. Some workers suffered severe injuries from banned chemicals. In 2016, Singapore-based Wilmar International was the world's biggest palm oil grower.

=== Plastic pollution ===
In 2019, Unilever was cited by BreakFreeFromPlastic as one of the top ten global plastic polluters. Unilever produces 6.4 billion unrecyclable plastic sachets per year.

Nevertheless, in 2019, Unilever announced that it plans to halve its non-recycled plastic packaging by 2025. In 2020, Unilever joined 13 EU member states and more than 60 companies to sign a pact to use recycled plastic for all plastic packaging and single-use plastic products by 2025.

In June 2022, a Reuters report revealed that Unilever had lobbied the governments of India and the Philippines to stop legislation which would ban the sale of cosmetics in single-use plastic sachets, despite vowing in 2020 to stop using them. The design of these sachets had been called "evil" by Hanneke Faber, Unilever's president for Global Food and Refreshments, "because you cannot recycle it". The bans were then dropped by lawmakers. In Sri Lanka, the company pressed the government to reconsider a proposed ban on sachets, and then tried to manoeuvre around the ban after regulations were implemented.

=== Rainforest Alliance ===
Unilever certifies its tea products by the Rainforest Alliance scheme. The company has stated that at least 50% of the tea in its products originates from certified farms, compared to the Alliance's 30% minimum entry point. Unilever decided on the scheme over Fairtrade, because according to the company's analysis, Fairtrade might "lack the scale and the organizational flexibility to certify industrial tea estates".

The Rainforest Alliance certification scheme has been criticised for not offering producers minimum or guaranteed price, therefore, leaving them vulnerable to market price variations. The alternative certificate, Fairtrade, has received similar criticism. The Rainforest Alliance certification has furthermore been criticised for allowing the use of the seal on products that contain only a minimum of 30% of certified content, which according to some endangers the integrity of the certification.

=== Salmonella contamination ===
In July 2016, rumours about salmonella contamination in cereals spread among Israeli consumers. Initially, Unilever did not provide public information about the subject and queries on the matter were rebuffed by the company as a non-story and nonsense. On 26 July 2016, Unilever had stopped transferring cornflakes to retailer chains. On 28 July, Yedioth Ahronoth reported tens of thousands of boxes of breakfast cereal had been destroyed. By 28 July, despite the company's assurances that nothing contaminated was released for consumption, many customers stopped buying Unilever products and started to throw away all cornflakes made by Unilever. The company withheld information about the affected production dates. Unilever had published more information about Telma cereals handled on the packaging line in which the contamination was discovered and that a Telma announcement had been made: "We again stress that all Telma products in the stores and in your homes are safe to eat. According to our company's strict procedures, every production batch is checked and put on hold. These products are not marketed until test results for this product series are returned, confirming that all is well. If any flaw is discovered, the batch is not marketed to stores, as was the case." In the following days the Health Minister, Yakov Litzman, threatened to pull Unilever's licence in Israel. He accused Unilever of lying to his ministry regarding salmonella-infected breakfast cereals.

On 7 August 2016, Globes reported that contamination may be sourced in pigeon faeces, the Health Ministry said that there might be other sources for the contamination and pigeon faeces are not the only possible source. Globes also said that the production line is automatic ("without human hands") and the possibility that the source is human is a very slim chance. On 8 August 2016, the Israeli Health minister suspended a manufacturing licence until Unilever carry out several corrections; the action came after an inspection of the Arad plant, stating "This was a series of negligent mistakes and not an incident with malicious intent by the firm's management and quality control procedures." An investigation led by Itamr Grutto and Eli Gordon concluded that the event was caused by negligence. Reportedly the cereals produced between the 18th and 20th at the Arad plant had traces of salmonella.

Two class actions were filed in Israel, one for a sum of 1.2 million Israeli shekels (around $320,000) against Unilever for hiding the contamination and misleading the public, and another for a sum of 76 million shekels (around $20 million) against Unilever after a 15-year-old teen had been hospitalised for Salmonellosis after allegedly contracting it from Unilever products.

On 31 August 2016, Unilever stated that the Tehina products produced by RJM had been contaminated by salmonella.

=== Trade in the occupied Palestinian Territories ===
In July 2021, Ben & Jerry's announced plans to end sales in Occupied Palestinian Territory, within which Israeli settlements are considered illegal under international law, while continuing sales in other parts of Israel. Prior to the release of the statement, Unilever had clashed with Ben & Jerry's independent board of directors, which had not wanted to comment on the continuation of sales in other parts of Israel, as this required board approval. Board chair Anuradha Mittal said the board had resolved to end sales in Israeli settlements in July 2020, but the CEO, Matthew McCarthy, appointed by Unilever in 2018, "never operationalized" the resolution.

It has also been suggested that the decision — while not technically a boycott, given the lack of legal recognition of the Palestinian Territories as a formal part of Israel under Israeli law — may run foul of anti-boycott laws in a number of US states. On 3 August 2021, governor of Florida Ron DeSantis announced that he had placed Unilever on a list of "Scrutinized Companies that Boycott Israel" as a result of Ben & Jerry's decision to "engage in the BDS movement". On 9 September, the State of Arizona committed to totally divest from Unilever by 21 September. On 14 September, the State of New Jersey also gave Unilever 90 days' notice of divestment action. Other states, including New York and Illinois, took similar steps against Unilever.

In June 2022, Unilever announced that it had sold its Ben & Jerry's division in Israel to American Quality Products, the company that has the exclusive licence to sell Ben & Jerry's products in Israel and the Palestinian territories. The sale of the division to American Quality Products allows it to continue to sell Ben & Jerry's products in Israel and the Palestinian territories. Later that day, Ben & Jerry's tweeted that it disagreed with its parent company's decision and that the "arrangement means Ben & Jerry's in Israel will be owned and operated by AQP. [...] We continue to believe it is inconsistent with Ben & Jerry's values for our ice cream to be sold in the Occupied Palestinian Territory."

In 2024, Ben & Jerry's started legal action against Unilever, accusing its parent company of trying to block their statements in support of Palestinian human rights by threatening to dismantle the Ben & Jerry's board and sue its directors. In October 2025, Ben & Jerry's co-founder Ben Cohen claimed that Unilever had blocked the company from developing a new watermelon flavour in support of Palestine. Cohen called Unilever's actions a "corporate attack on free speech" despite the flavour being approved by Ben & Jerry's independent board. Ben & Jerry's was divested by Unilever as part of its TMICC divestment in late 2025.

=== Trade in Russia amid the Russo-Ukrainian War ===
Following the Russian invasion of Ukraine in February 2022, many Western companies curtailed their operations in Russia and Belarus. Unilever suspended all imports from and exports to Russia, but its Russian wing continued to trade there. Between 2021 and 2022, profits in Russia doubled to 9.2 billion rubles (€108 million) and the business paid 3.2 billion rubles (€38 million) in taxes, giving rise to criticism that the company was directly helping to fund Russia's war effort in Ukraine. In response to this, and other claims that the company had broken previous promises to only sell essential items, Unilever's then-CEO, Alan Jope, said "We still believe that staying is the best option, both to prevent our company from falling directly or indirectly into Russian hands and to protect our people."

In July 2023, the Ukrainian National Agency on Corruption Prevention included Unilever in their list of "war sponsors" for not ceasing operations in Russia and continuing to profit from this market. The same month, Unilever's new CEO, Hein Schumacher, told reporters the company had considered leaving Russia, but had concluded that "operating our business in a constrained manner is the least bad option and that is where we are."

However, on 10 October 2024, Schumacher announced on the company's website that Unilever had finalised the sale of its Russian business to the Arnest Group; a Russian manufacturer of perfume, cosmetics, and household products. The sale included all of Unilever's business in Russia, including four factories, and its business in Belarus.

=== Environmental claims ===
The UK Competition and Markets Authority announced that it would be scrutinising environmental claims made by Unilever in 2023. The move came as part of the CMA's wider FMCG investigation into greenwashing. The CMA closed the investigation towards the end of 2024, after Unilever changed some of the environmental claims they were making.

== See also ==
- List of food companies
