= Hippolyte Mège-Mouriès =

French chemist and inventor

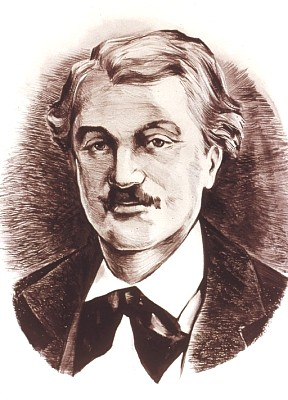
- Hippolyte Mège-Mouriès
- Born: Hippolyte Mège; 24 October 1817; Draguignan, France
- Died: 31 May 1880 (aged 62); Neuilly-sur-Seine, France
- Known for: Margarine
- Scientific career
- Fields: Chemist

External media

Audio
- “Butter vs. Margarine”, Distillations Podcast, Science History Institute

Video
- “Hippolyte Mège-Mouriès’s Recipe for Margarine”, Distillations, Science History Institute

Hippolyte Mège-Mouriès (French: [ipɔlit mɛʒ muʁjɛs]; 24 October 1817 – 31 May 1880) was a French chemist and inventor who is famous for his invention of margarine.

== Early life ==
Hippolyte Mège was born on 24 October 1817 in Draguignan to Jean Joseph-Emmanuel Mège and his wife, Marie Marguerite Mouriès. The son of a primary school teacher, he added his mother's surname to his own around 1850 to distinguish himself from others of the same last name. Legal documents, however, often used "Mège". In 1838, Mège obtained a job as a pharmacist in the central pharmacy of the Hôtel-Dieu hospital in Paris.

== Early work ==
Mège started to publish original contributions in applied chemistry, such as a form of the syphilis medicine Copahin refined with nitric acid that eliminated side-effects. He also obtained patents for effervescent tablets, for techniques in paper making and sugar refining, and for the tanning of leather using egg yolks.

By 1852, Mège-Mouriès was studying the chemistry of foods. He added calcium phosphate and protein to chocolate in an attempt to make it healthier.

== Bread ==
By 1855, Mège-Mouriès was studying bread. In addition to examining the coloration of bread, he developed a way of making bread that allowed bakers to produce 14% more bread given a fixed amount of ingredients. This was a major achievement, arousing international interest in France, Germany, and Britain. His work was a topic of great interest at the Royal Society of Arts in London. Eliza Acton discussed his new discoveries in detail in The English Bread-Book For Domestic Use (1857). Mège-Mouriès received two gold medals for his work. In 1861, Napoleon III awarded him the Légion d’Honneur for his work on bread-making.

== Margarine ==
In the 1860s, Mège-Mouriès focused on fat processing. France was experiencing a butter shortage, and Napoleon III offered a prize for producing a butter substitute. Mège-Mouriès experimented with what was believed to be a new fatty acid discovered by Michel Eugene Chevreul, acide margarique or margaric acid. By 1867, Mège-Mouriès was working at la Ferme Impériale de la Faisanderie, Napoleon III's private farm in Vincennes near Paris.

Mège-Mouriès's invention, originally known as oleomargarine, was created by mixing processed beef tallow with skimmed milk. It produced whitish-looking beads or pearls. A British patent application describes the process as follows:

A fatty body identical in chemical composition with butter is obtained from fresh suet by crushing it between rollers under a stream of water, further washing it and then digesting it with agricultural gastric juice. The fat is extracted, melted, passed through a sieve and poured into boxes to set, after which it is cut into pieces, which are wrapped in cloths and pressed between hot plates. A fatty body is expressed and may be agitated in a closed vessel, cooled, cut up, bleached with acid and washed with water. This purified fat is mixed at animal heat (104°F) with water containing small quantities of bicarbonate of soda, casein of cold milk and mammary tissues along with yellow coloring matter. This is digested, allowed to settle, decanted and cooled and yields a preserved butter. Fresh butter is obtained by agitating the above mixture until a cream is formed, which is then treated as usual to obtain the butter.

Although Mège-Mouriès did not correctly understand the chemistry involved, his process was a significant achievement in that he successfully rendered a bland, neutral fat at low temperatures, using water, and discovered that working fat and milk together gave the result a flavor similar to butter.

His process resulted in a cheap but qualitatively good substitute for butter for the working class and, incidentally, the French Navy. Mège-Mouriès received a prize in 1870 from the French government, formally led by Emperor Louis Napoleon III. He attempted to start a manufacturing facility at Poissy, but the enterprise floundered because of the Franco-Prussian War.

Mège-Mouriès applied for a number of patents for the process of making margarine. French patent (brevet) No. 86,480 for "production de certains corps gras d'origine animale" was filed on 15 July 1869. It was granted on 2 October 1869 for a period of fifteen years. Mège-Mouriès also received an English patent on July 17, 1869, and one for Austria on October 31, 1869. Patents were obtained for Bavaria on April 8, 1873, and Patent 146012 for the United States on December 30, 1873.

This did not protect him from competitors in all countries. In 1869, the Netherlands repealed its Patent Act of 1817. In 1883, the Paris Convention attempted to regularize the rights of all signatory countries, but the Dutch did not pass a new patent act until 1910. From 1869 to 1912, the Netherlands effectively lacked patent agreements. In the absence of a Dutch legal framework that defined patent rights, Mège-Mouriès could not claim, assert or sell such rights. He could not apply for a patent, establish a monopoly, or license others to do so in the Netherlands.

Accounts differ as to exactly how Mège-Mouriès' process was acquired by the Dutch. Butter suppliers such as Jurgens and van den Bergh had been exporting large amounts of butter to England and other countries for decades. Now, they were no longer required by reciprocal agreements to respect the margarine patents granted to Mège-Mouriès in other countries.

Mège-Mouriès showed his invention to Dutch butter exporter Antoon Jurgens in 1871. He may have been paid a compensatory fee. Mège-Mouriès may not have realized that his patent was not protected in the Netherlands by patent agreements when he demonstrated his techniques to Jurgens. Alternatively he may have understood the difficulty of maintaining control of his invention given the lack of a Dutch patent law, and decided to accept a compensatory fee for sharing his knowledge. A number of sources state that he sold his patent rights to Jurgens, but what this could mean is unclear given the absence of Dutch laws governing the definition, ownership, transfer and enforcement of patent rights at the time. It would be more accurate to say that he sold his knowledge of the process.

Untroubled by patent restrictions, Jurgens developed Mège-Mouriès's ideas further and began to manufacture and sell margarine, as did another Dutch company under Simon van den Bergh. Both were located in Oss in North Brabant. Jurgens' company eventually became part of Unilever.

Mège-Mouriès made very little profit from the invention of oleomargarine, which never became popular in France. Jurgens and van den Bergh created a substantial export industry, selling margarine to England and other countries, as did a number of smaller competitors. In the 1880s there were at least 70 margarine factories in the Netherlands. In 1911 Jurgens exported 111,000 tons of margarine, and Van den Bergh 112,000.

== Death ==
Hippolyte Mège-Mouriès died on May 31, 1880. He was buried near his wife and son, in Père Lachaise Cemetery in Paris.
