= Antonius Johannes Jurgens =

Dutch businessman

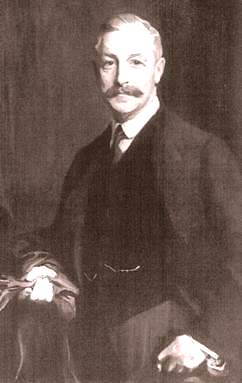
Antonius Johannes Jurgens

Antonius Johannes Jurgens, also known as Anton Jurgens (8 February 1867 – 12 March 1945) was a Dutch businessman.

He was born in Oss, the grandson of Joanna Lemmens and of Antoon Jurgens, who founded a butter company in 1867 and, in 1871, the first margarine factory in the world.

The Jurgens family had moved from the neighborhood of Heerlen, in the south of the Netherlands and close to the German border, to Oss, where the family company was founded; they were known as the moffen, a derogatory term for Germans. Anton Jurgens became the pater familias of the company, which would retain its family structure until the fusion with Van den Bergh in 1927.

Jurgens succeeded his father in business at the age of 21, and was one of the main European margarine and soap manufacturers in the early twentieth century with Pieter-Eduard Leverd. In the late nineteenth century he also started margarine factories in Germany and Belgium. Although initially in fierce competition with another manufacturer from Oss, Samuel van den Bergh, in 1927 he joined him to form the Margarine Unie, which in 1930 merged with William Lever, 2nd Viscount Leverhulme of Lever Brothers to form Unilever.

His whaling monopoly also led Jurgens to be called the "prince of whales".

From 1919 to 1921, he also served in the Senate as a member of the Roman Catholic State Party; he was forced to give up his seat because of the demands of his business.

He died in 1945 Torquay, in England, and was buried there and later reinterred in Poissy, in France, beside his wife and his son Henri, who had died in an accident in 1933. Former politician Erik Jurgens is a family member.
