= Samuel van den Bergh =

Dutch politician (1864–1941)

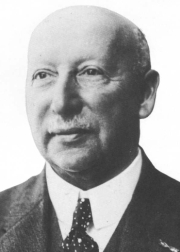
Samuel van den Bergh

Samuel van den Bergh (6 April 1864, in Geffen – 4 February 1941, in Nice) was one of the main European Jewish margarine and soap manufacturers in the early 20th century.

In 1888, the year his father, Simon van den Bergh, opened his first German margarine factory in Kleve, van den Bergh joined his father's margarine company, of which he became general director in 1909 after his father's death in 1907. He was initially in fierce competition with another manufacturer from Oss, Netherlands, named Antonius Johannes Jurgens, whose grandfather, Antoon Jurgens, had founded the first margarine factory in the world in 1870 in Oss by "using" a French patent and operated another German factory in nearby Goch. Both competitors merged in 1927 to form the Margarine Unie in Rotterdam (which would merge in 1930 with Lever Brothers to form Unilever).

House of Representatives of the Netherlands
Preceded by Dirk Fock	Member for Rotterdam I 1905–1909	Succeeded by Hendrik Goeman Borgesius
