= Cyril Ray =

English writer and journalist

Cyril Ray in the 1940s, by Bill Brandt

Cyril Ray (16 March 1908 – 24 September 1991) was an English writer and journalist. After a spell as a war reporter, and then a foreign correspondent he became best known for writing about food and, especially, wine. He became a wine writer almost randomly, and had strong interests in other spheres such as military history and riding. His wife Elizabeth Ray also wrote about food. In addition to writing about food and wine, Ray wrote histories of major wine producers, including the champagne maker Bollinger and the claret houses Lafite and Mouton Rothschild. A strong socialist, he resigned from prominent positions when he felt his principles incompatible with those of the publication.

== Life and career ==
=== Early years ===
Ray was born in Bury, Lancashire, the eldest son of Albert Benson Ray (né Rotenberg), an optician, and Rita Ray (née Caminetsky), both Jews. He was educated at the Wesleyan church school in Bury and then at Manchester Grammar School from where he won an open scholarship to Jesus College, Oxford. He had to leave Oxford after a year, as the family's funds ran out.

When Ray left Oxford the Great Depression was at its worst and worthwhile jobs were scarce. Ray worked as a teacher, and then took a job in a riding school, where riding became one of his great loves. He took a short service commission in the Royal Air Force, and was posted to an obsolescent balloon squadron. His duties were light, and he had leisure for extensive reading. He then worked in a shop in Liverpool, and then ran an avant garde cinema in Manchester, where he got to know staff from The Manchester Guardian. In 1936, with their help, he was taken on as a general reporter for the paper.

In 1939 Ray was working in The Manchester Guardian's London office. On the outbreak of the Second World War he was appointed as one of the paper's war correspondents, first with the Fifth Destroyer Flotilla in the Channel, and then covering the North Africa landings in 1942 and the Eighth Army's Italian campaign. On one occasion, with no authority whatever, he assumed temporary command of a Canadian platoon in Italy when its officer and senior NCOs had been put out of action. He was mentioned in dispatches. In 1944 he moved to the BBC as correspondent with the American airborne assault on Nijmegen and with the Third Army push into Germany. There, too, he displayed conspicuous courage, and received an American army citation.

=== Post-war ===
After the war, Ray was for a time The Daily Express's correspondent in Rome. He followed that with a spell as a freelance, during which he enhanced his reputation as a broadcaster, already made in radio talks during the war. During this period he was also a member of UNESCO missions in Italy, Greece, and countries in east, central and southern Africa, between 1945 and 1950. in 1948 he published his first book, Scenes and Characters from Surtees, his choice of extracts from the work of R. S. Surtees, the Victorian author of comic novels.

From 1949 to 1956 he was on the staff of The Sunday Times; his colleague Godfrey Smith later recalled, "He wrote the Atticus column and the Autolycus saleroom column. He was also Christopher Pym, the reviewer of thrillers. … He understudied Harold Hobson and Dilys Powell as dramatic critic and film critic respectively … He was even, for one or two heady weeks, Sarah Bellamy, the chief features editor of the women's page." From 1950 to 1952 Ray was the paper's Moscow correspondent, a frustrating post at a time when the Soviet authorities were at their most secretive and suspicious. In 1953 he "settled down after 43 years as a bachelor, bon vivant and boulevardier, to live happily ever after with his wife, Liz," – Elizabeth Mary Brocklehurst, with whom he had one son. She edited The Best of Eliza Acton, a selection of recipes from Acton's Modern Cookery for Private Families.

One of Ray's strongest interests was military history, and in 1952 he published From Algiers to Austria: The History of 78 Division. He held strong views on morals and politics. He left The Sunday Times over its editorial support for capital punishment. He joined The Spectator in 1958. His colleagues there included Bernard Levin, Katharine Whitehorn and, later, Elizabeth David.

=== Wine writer ===
Ray's position as a wine writer came out of his appointment in the early 1950s as editor of a magazine, The Compleat Imbiber, sent to its customers by an independent wine merchant, W. and A. Gilbey. This led to invitations to contribute wine columns to Punch and other magazines. In the words of The Times, "Ray quickly developed his own style of wine writing, which was practical and factual with a lively spicing of anecdote. … His was a new voice in an area where flowery phrases had proliferated. He was ready to write about spirits as well as wine." He told Smith that his private idea of paradise would be to lie on a chaise-longue reading paperback thrillers and being brought Guinness every hour by nubile girls. He wrote books about the makers of great wine, including Bollinger champagne, and Châteaux Lafite and Mouton Rothschild. To those who asked how a socialist could be a wine connoisseur he replied, "There is no more virtue in not minding what you eat and drink than in not minding whom you go to bed with."

When the proprietor of The Spectator, Ian Gilmour, announced in 1962 that he proposed to stand for Parliament for the right-wing Conservative party, Ray and many other Spectator writers left. He had already written for the Sunday paper, The Observer since 1959, and he went on doing so until he retired in 1973. In retirement he continued to write for Punch and published another 14 books between 1973 and 1988.

In his later years, Ray lived mostly in London, in his rooms at Albany. He died in 1991 at the age of 83.

== Books ==
=== By Cyril Ray ===
- (ed.) Scenes and Characters from Surtees, 1948
- From Algiers to Austria: The History of 78th Division, Eyre & Spottiswoode, 1952
- The Pageant of London, Batsford, 1957
- Merry England, Vista Books, 1958
- (ed.) The Gourmet's Companion, Eyre & Spottiswoode, 1963
- Regiment of the Line: The Story of the Lancashire Fusiliers, Batsford, 1964, abridged edition published as The Lancashire Fusiliers: The 20th Regiment of Foot, Leo Cooper, 1971
- (ed.) Morton Shand’s Book of French Wines, Penguin, 1964
- (ed.) Best Murder Stories, Faber, 1965
- The Wines of Italy, McGraw, 1966, revised edition, Penguin, 1971.
- In a Glass Lightly, Methuen, 1967.
- Lafite: The Story of Chateau Lafite-Rothschild, P. Davies, 1968, Stein & Day, 1969, revised edition, 1982
- Bollinger: The Story of a Champagne, St. Martin's, 1971, revised edition, 1988
- Cognac, P. Davies, 1973, Stein & Day, 1974, revised edition, Harrap, 1985
- Mouton-Rothschild: The Wine, the Family, the Museum, Christie's Wine Department (London), 1974
- (with Elizabeth Ray) Wine with Food, Sidgwick & Jackson, 1975
- The Wines of France, Allen Lane, 1976
- The Wines of Germany, Allen Lane, 1977
- The Complete Book of Spirits and Liqueurs, Macmillan, 1978
- Cyril Ray's Book of Wine, Morrow, 1978 (published in England as The St. Michael Guide to Wine, Artus Publishing Co., 1978),(revised in 1982 and reprinted in 1985 by Peerage Books as "The Guide to Wine")
- Ray on Wine, Dent, 1979
- Lickerish Limericks, Dent, 1979
- Ruffino: the story of a Chianti, 1979
- Lickerish Limericks, with Filthy Pictures by Charles Mozley, 1979
- The New Book of Italian Wines, Sidgwick & Jackson, 1982
- Robert Mondavi of the Napa Valley, Heinemann, 1984
- (ed.) Vintage Tales: Anthology of Wine and Other Intoxications, Century Publishing, 1984

=== By Elizabeth Ray ===
- Resourceful Cook, Macmillan, 1978
- 'Good Housekeeping' Country Cooking, Ebury Press, 1979
- (with Prue Leith) Alexis Soyer: Cook Extraordinary, Southover Press, 1991
- (editor) The Best of Eliza Acton, Longmans, Green, & Co., 1968
- Homemade Ice Cream, Ebury Press, 1978
