= Modern Cookery for Private Families =

Bestselling 1845 English cookbook by Eliza Acton

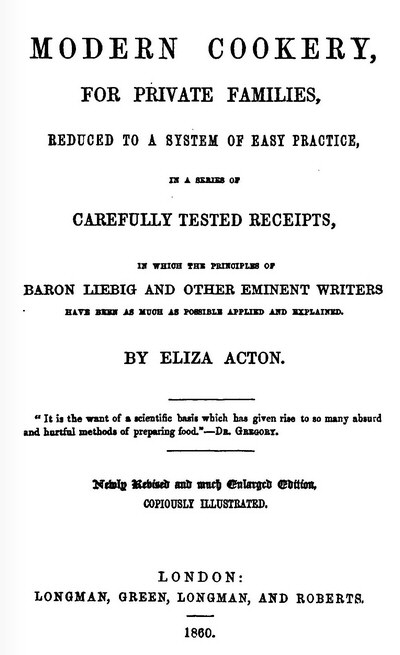
- Title Page of 1860 edition
- Author: Eliza Acton
- Subject: English cooking
- Genre: Cookery
- Publisher: Longmans
- Publication date: 1847
- Publication place: England

Modern Cookery for Private Families is an English cookery book by Eliza Acton. It was first published by Longmans in 1845, and was a best-seller, running through 13 editions by 1853, though its sales were later overtaken by Mrs Beeton. On the strength of the book, Delia Smith called Acton "the best writer of recipes in the English language", while Elizabeth David wondered why "this peerless writer" had been eclipsed by such inferior and inexperienced imitators.

It was one of the first cookery books to provide lists of ingredients, exact quantities, and cooking times, and to include Eastern recipes for chutneys.

The book was well received on its first appearance; critics thought it the best cookery book they had seen, combining as it did clarity of instructions with excellent organisation. Acton's recipes and writing style have been admired by cooks including Bee Wilson, Elizabeth David, Delia Smith and Jane Grigson; Clarissa Dickson Wright praises her writing but criticises her increasing conformity to Victorian dullness.

== Book ==
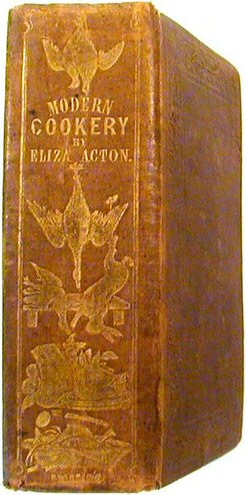
Cover of 1847 edition

The book was the result of several years of research, prompted by Longman, who had published Acton's Poems. Many of the recipes came from her friends. Modern Cookery quickly became a bestselling work, appearing in several editions and remaining a standard cookery book throughout the rest of the century. The book was immensely influential, establishing the format for modern cookery book writing, by listing the exact ingredients required for each recipe, the time needed, and potential problems that might arise. This was a major departure from previous cookbooks, which were less precise.

The book was one of the first to list recipes for Eastern "chatneys", both fresh, like her "Mauritian shrimp chatney" with lemon and oil, and preserved, like her "Bengal chatney" with raisins, crab apples, garlic, and ginger. It has been asserted that the book was the first to use the name "Christmas pudding", in the first edition of 1845; the dish had earlier been known simply as plum pudding. Her recipe for mincemeat (as in mince pies) still contained meat – she suggests ox tongue or beef sirloin – which she combined with lemons "boiled quite tender and chopped up entirely with the exception of the pips".

The book remained in print for over 50 years through most of the Victorian era, but it is Mrs Beeton's book, first published in 1861, which is now remembered from that period.

The title varied somewhat over the years; the 1845 edition's full title was

Modern Cookery, In All Its Branches: Reduced to a System of Easy Practice, for the Use of Private Families. In a Series of Practical Receipts, Which Have Been Strictly Tested, And are Given with the Most Minute exactness.

By 1860, the title had become

Modern Cookery, For Private Families, Reduced to a System of Easy Practice, In a Series of Carefully Tested Receipts, In Which the Principles of Baron Liebig and Other Eminent Writers Have Been as Much as Possible Applied and Explained.

=== Contents ===
The following list refers to the 1860 edition.

- Preface vii
- Vocabulary of Terms, principally French, used in Modern Cookery xiii
- Table of Contents xv
- Introductory Chapter: Trussing xxxiii
- Introductory Chapter: Carving xxxvii
1. Soups 1
2. Fish 48
3. Dishes of Shell-fish 85
4. Gravies 94
5. Sauces 106
6. Cold Sauces, Salads, etc. 132
7. Store Sauces 145
8. Forcemeats 156
9. Boiling, Roasting, etc. 167
10. Beef 184
11. Veal 209
12. Mutton 235
13. Pork 247
14. Poultry 264
15. Game 281
16. Curries, Potted Meats, etc. 296
17. Vegetables 308
18. Pastry 344
19. Souffles, Omlets, etc. 377
20. Boiled Puddings 395
21. Baked Puddings 423
22. Egg and Milk 444
23. Sweet Dishes, or Entremets 453
24. Preserves 493
25. Pickles 531
26. Cakes 540
27. Confectionary 562
28. Dessert Dishes 569
29. Syrups, Liqueurs, etc. 577
30. Coffee, Chocolate, etc. 587
31. Bread 594
32. Foreign and Jewish Cookery 605
- Index 623-643

=== Approach ===
Acton's book is divided into chapters with brief, often single word titles such as "Fish". In a marked departure from eighteenth century English cookery books like Hannah Glasse's The Art of Cookery, these are written as connected wholes. The chapter on fish begins with an essay on how to choose fish for freshness; there follows some advice on how to bake fish, and on the kinds of fat best used for frying fish. Suitable pans are illustrated. The recipes follow; these too are written as stories rather than simply as instructions. Where appropriate, recipes end with a list of ingredients, as well as the cooking time, in marked change from eighteenth century practice. Recipes are grouped, in the case of fish by species, and they form a connected story. Acton adds comments where she sees fit, indicating anything from when the food is in season to where a recipe came from, and how much she likes it. For example, she begins her account of the John Dory with a recipe which is more of an introductory essay than a set of instructions, though given the simplicity of the recipe, it says all that a cook would need to know on the matter:

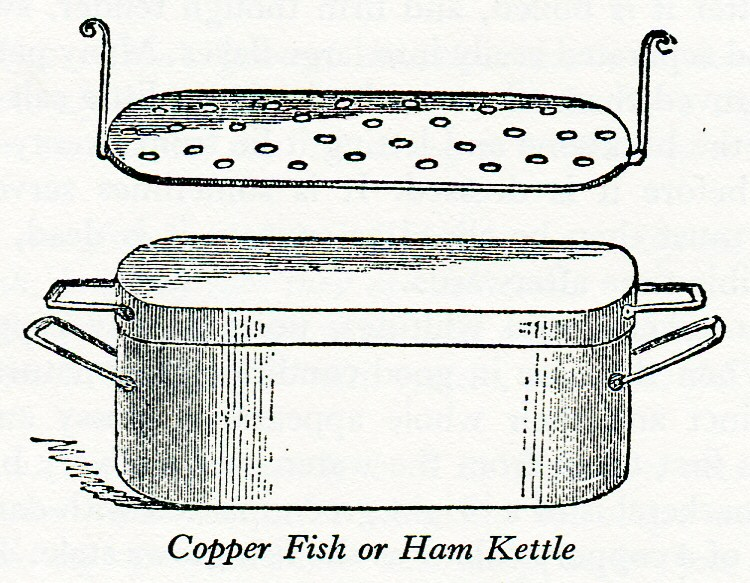
Wood engraving of "Copper Fish or Ham Kettle"

TO BOIL A JOHN DORY.
[In best season from Michaelmas to Christmas, but good all the year]

The John Dory, though of uninviting appearance, is considered by some persons as the most delicious fish that appears at table; in the general estimation, however, it ranks next to the turbot, but it is far less abundant in our waters, and is not commonly to be procured of sufficient size for a handsome dish, except in some few parts of our coast which are celebrated for it. It may easily be known by its yellow gray colour, its one large dark spot on either side, the long filaments on the back, a general thickness of form, and its very ugly head. It is dressed in the same manner, and served usually with the same sauces as a turbot, but requires less time to boil it. The fins should be cut off before it is cooked.

Acton follows this with an actual recipe, again characteristically simple, and with one of her brief parenthetical asides, at once modestly claiming ownership and praising the dish:

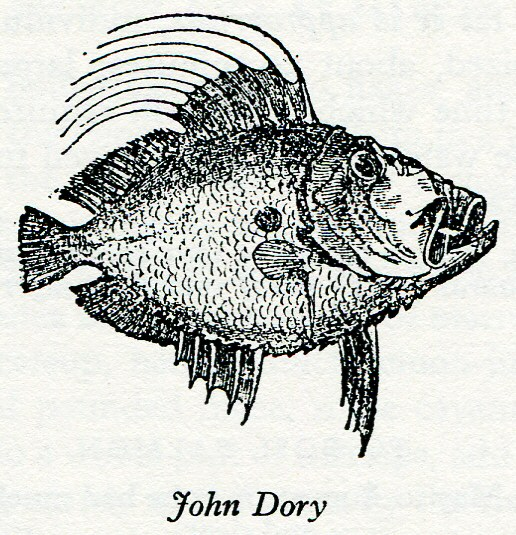
Wood engraving of John Dory

SMALL JOHN DORIES BAKED.
(Author's Receipt—good.)

We have found these fish when they were too small to be worth cooking in the usual way, excellent when quite simply baked in the following manner, the flesh being remarkably sweet and tender, much more so than it becomes by frying or broiling. After they have been cleaned, dry them in a cloth, season the insides slightly with fine salt, dredge a little flour on the fish, and stick a few very small bits of butter on them, but only just sufficient to prevent their becoming dry in the oven; lay them singly on a flat dish, and bake them very gently from fourteen to sixteen minutes. Serve them with the same sauce as baked soles.
When extremely fresh, as it usually is in the markets of the coast, fish thus simply dressed au four is preferable to that more elaborately prepared by adding various condiments to it after it is placed in a deep dish, and covering it with a thick layer of bread crumbs, moistened with clarified butter.
The appearance of the John Dories is improved by taking off the heads, and cutting away not only the fins but the filaments of the back.

=== Illustrations ===
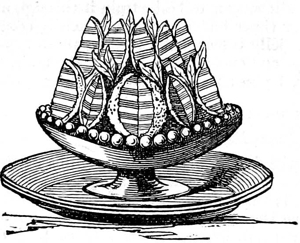
Wood engraving of Orange Jellies garnished with myrtle leaves

The book was from the first edition onwards illustrated with a large number of small woodcuts. Some show cookware, like the pot used to serve Bouillon or the "Mackerel Kettle", a deep oval saucepan with a lid, used to cook fish; some illustrate produce as the housekeeper would see it in the market, like the engravings of poultry and fish—educating the reader in the recognition of gurnard, sea bream, plaice, grey mullet, garfish, and sand-eel; others show finished dishes, like the Lady's Tourte or a moulded jelly, "tastefully garnished with preserved, or with fresh fruit."

== Reception ==
=== Contemporary ===
The reviews for Modern Cookery were positive. The unnamed critic for The Atlas described it as "the best book of the sort" they had seen, and described the layout for the recipes to be "excellent", while the critic from The Morning Post considered it "unquestionably the most valuable compendium of the art that has yet been published". In a positive review in The Exeter and Plymouth Gazette, praise was given to "the intelligibility of the instructions which are given", which contrasted with other cookery books; the reviewer for the Kentish Gazette also commended the clarity of the instructions, and the inclusion of ingredients and timings, which led them to consider the book "a superior work". The review in The Spectator stated that the order of the book was "very natural", while "the methods are clearly described, and seem founded on chemical principles".

=== Modern ===
Delia Smith called Acton "the best writer of recipes in the English language". Elizabeth David similarly called Modern Cookery "the greatest cookery book in our language". Bee Wilson, writing in The Telegraph, agrees that it is "the greatest British cookbook of all time", adding that Acton deserves to be a household name.

Elizabeth David asks why "this peerless writer" was eclipsed by "imitators so limited in experience, and in capacity of expression so inferior?" She answers her own question with the suggestion that Acton, born in 1799, was "in taste and in spirit, a child of the eighteenth century." David notes that the year after Modern Cookery was first published, (Note: The product may have appeared a few years earlier.) Bird's Custard Powder was launched: "What we know as modern cookery, and it had little to do with Eliza Acton's version, was on its way." And she points out that manuals like Mrs Beeton's, which in later editions were edited and re-written by other hands, existed to allow cooks to look up recipes, rather than to read cookery books. She concludes that "A book such as Miss Acton's, written as a coherent whole, is essentially one to be read, as it is written, with intelligence and understanding and application."

She dispenses her sly wit sparingly, like truffles. 'The Publisher's Pudding', we are told, 'can scarcely be made too rich' (it is studded with Jordan almonds and muscatel raisins) in contrast to 'The Poor Author's Pudding', a modest bread-and-butter affair.

Bee Wilson argues that the greatness of the book comes from "Acton's very British sensibility. She calls a spade a spade, noting that some of the coffee served on the newfangled railway lines was a 'commercial disgrace'." Wilson adds that Acton has both honesty and reticence: she does not "gush" when she really likes something, "but puts it in brackets, as if holding her emotions in. 'Lemon Dumplings (Light and Good)', for example. Or 'Mushrooms Au Beurre (Delicious)'... that makes her Eliza Acton (The Best)."

Elizabeth Ray, editor of The Best of Eliza Acton—a selection of recipes from Modern Cookery with an introduction by Elizabeth David, notes that Acton began her writing career with poetry, only to be told by her publishers that a cookery book would be better, and that "an unmistakable literary talent appears even in her receipts, in the style itself, and in the engaging titles she bestows on some of her dishes", which include "The Elegant Economist's Pudding" as well as those of publishers and authors.

Clarissa Dickson Wright, in her A History of English Food, calls Acton "the best cookery writer of the period", noting that she paid "considerable attention" to curry in the book. Dickson Wright comments that Acton knew about "her countrymen"'s lack of understanding of curry and "lamented 'the great superiority of the oriental curries over those generally prepared in England'". She further notes that Acton suggested practical improvements, such as grating coconut into the gravy, and using tamarind, acid apples and cucumber to simulate the "piquancy you get with bitter gourds, mango, and so on", which she comments was certainly better than lazily adding lemon juice, but still nothing like "anything prepared by my grandmother's Indian cook."

Dickson Wright also comments on the early signs in Modern Cookery of what she considers the increasing dullness of Victorian cookery. Although she finds Acton "in most respects an admirable cookery writer", she observes that between the first and the third editions Acton has gone from using garlic sparingly to avoiding it entirely. She is equally scathing about Acton's "Burlington Whimsey" which she calls "basically a dish of brawn"; she argues that the Victorians were too fond of it, and that Acton's recipe is "the epitome of dull food dressed up to look whimsical."

Sue Dyson and Roger McShane, reviewing the book on FoodTourist, call it the "very antithesis" of the elaborate haute cuisine of Marie-Antoine Carême, and note that it was one of the first cookery books to provide quantities, timings, and lists of ingredients. They find the recipe for Mulligatawny soup "wonderful", the oyster sausages "very tasty", and the "Potato Boulettes" like a French equivalent of gnocchi. But "the section that really caught our interest" was puddings and desserts. They conclude that "this is an inspirational book with an Aladdin's Cave of recipes and wonderful, timeless writing" and an "absolutely essential part of any serious cookbook collection."

Kathryn Hughes, writing in The Guardian, observes that Acton has been set up as "the saint to Mrs Beeton's sinner", "an Austenish heroine: a stylish Regency spinster, a poet rather than a journalist, a committed cookery writer rather than an opportunistic hack." She notes that Elizabeth David created this image, supported by Jane Grigson, and Delia Smith: "in short, anyone who wants to be in the kitchen cool gang knows that the name to drop is Acton's." She agrees that Mrs Beeton "pinched" Acton's recipes, along with those of other authors, because they were "rather good". She notes the "elegant tilt of Acton's writing" and its "sly humour", as well as the accuracy of the recipes, very unlike eighteenth-century vagueness, and calls Acton "an admirable pioneer".

Natalie Whittle, writing in the Financial Times in 2011, describes how recipes such as "Water Souchy" (a clear fish soup) from Modern Cookery and other books of the period are being revived at English restaurants.

Simon Hopkinson, writing in The Independent in 2000, praises Acton's Christmas pudding: "It was to the cookery writing of the legendary Eliza Acton where Joyce Molyneux [of the Carved Angel] went to find her perfect pudding recipe. And, as far as I remember, the particular reason why she liked the result of Acton's recipe above all others was because it had this unusual lightness to it, yet also seemed to offer up the required richness too."

The Tonbridge Historical Society note that "by 1827 Eliza was living in Tonbridge at No. 1 Bordyke ... Not surprisingly there are many references to Kent and some to Tonbridge in Eliza's recipes. There is 'Kentish' sausage meat, suet pudding and cherry jam, 'Tonbridge' brawn, and ‘Bordyke’ Veal cake, preserved ham and bread."

== Editions ==
The book appeared in the following editions during the Victorian era.

Editions
- 1st edition, Longmans, London, 1845.
- 1st edition, Lea and Blanchard, Philadelphia, 1845.
- 2nd edition, Longmans, London, 1845.
- 5th edition, Longman, Brown, Green, 1846.
- 6th edition, Longman, Brown, Green & Longmans, 1847.
- 7th edition, Longman, Brown, Green, Longmans and Roberts, 1847.
- 9th edition, Longman, Brown, Green and Longmans, 1849.
- 10th edition, Longman, Brown, Green and Longmans, 1850.
- 13th edition, Longman, Brown, Green & Longmans, 1853.
- Newly revised and much enlarged, 1855.

--- reprinted by Quadrille, 2011. Introduction by Jill Norman.

- Newly revised and much enlarged, Longman, Green, Longman, & Roberts, 1860.
- Newly revised and much enlarged, Longman, Green, Longman, Roberts, & Green, 1864.
- Newly revised and much enlarged, 1865.

--- edited and annotated by Dyfed Lloyd Evans, 2012.

- Longmans, Green, Reader and Dyer, 1868.
- Longmans, London and New York, 1891.

== Sources ==
- Ray, Elizabeth, ed. (1968). The Best of Eliza Acton. Longmans.
