= Geffen, Netherlands =

Geffen
- Village
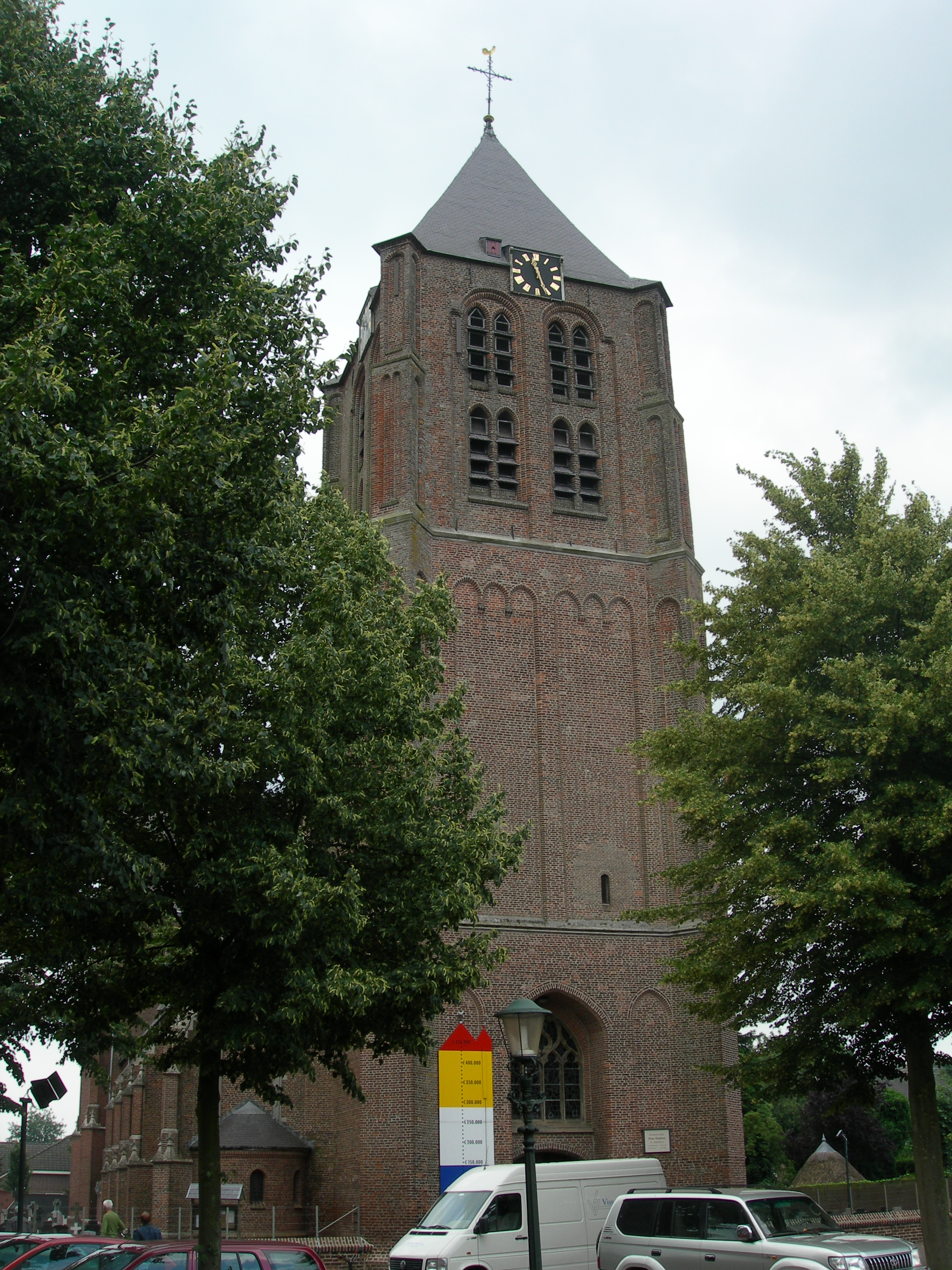
- Tower of the Church of Maria Magdalena

- Coat of arms

- Location in the province of North Brabant in the Netherlands Geffen (Netherlands)
- Coordinates: 51°44′21″N 5°27′50″E
- Country: Netherlands
- Province: North Brabant
- Municipality: Oss

Area
  - Total: 11.03 km^{2} (4.26 sq mi)
- Elevation: 6 m (20 ft)

Population (2021)
  - Total: 4,995
  - Density: 452.9/km^{2} (1,173/sq mi)
- Time zone: UTC+1 (CET)
  - Summer (DST): UTC+2 (CEST)
- Postal code: 5386
- Dialing code: 073

Geffen had been an independent municipality in the Dutch province of North Brabant until 1993, when it became a part of the newly formed municipality Maasdonk. This lasted until 2015, when Maasdonk was dissolved and Geffen became part of Oss.

Archeological findings show that the area had been inhabited since the Stone Age (2000 B.C.). The date of settlement is not known. The first time Geffen was mentioned in official documents was on the October 1, 1246. There have been many different names for Geffen, including Ghiffen and Gheneffen. Gheneffen most probably had been created as a fusion between "gen" + "effa", which means "on the water's edge". In the year 1298, Duke Jan II of Brabant granted the town of Geffen rights for peat harvesting.

In the following centuries, Geffen became a fiefdom. The Vassal of Geffen resided in the castle of Geffen close to the border of Nuland. During a French raid in the 18th century this castle was destroyed and at this time only the ditch and its fortifications can be found.

== After the Second World War ==
Up until the Second World War things did not really change in Geffen; it maintained a population of roughly 1,200. In 1956 the first planned neighbourhood began construction. During this time, neighbouring Oss started to become a true city and many facilities moved away. Geffen itself grew in every direction except north; this is mainly because of the railway embankment which protects Geffen from flooding from the Meuse. With the creation of the A50 highway, a dig site was opened at the border of Oss, Heesch and Geffen. After the construction of the highway was completed this area was reformed into a swimming point (the Geffenseplas) and a small forest.

== Education ==
There are two schools in Geffen, both are Catholic schools. The Aloysiusschool, which can be found between town hall and the local supermarket, and the Mariaschool, which lies next to the church and has a more religious background. In March 2009, the building of a new school started. The former Aloysius- and Mariaschool have merged into one multifunctional building, containing the new school, called De Wissel.

== Religion ==
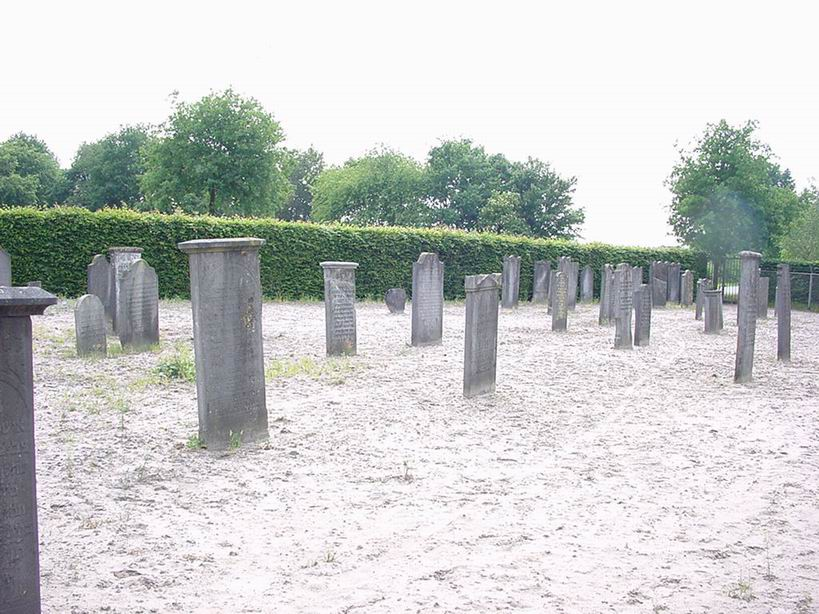
The Jewish cemetery in Geffen

Around 1450 the bell tower of the Maria Magdalena Church was built. The church survived numerous fires and floods, even the burning of Geffen by Charles II, Duke of Guelders in 1487. At the end of the Second World War, the German military tried to blow up the church like they did with the churches of Nuland, Heesch and Vinkel. At the ceiling level, the marks of this are still visible.

One of the oldest Jewish cemeteries in North Brabant can be found in Geffen. As early as 1693 the archives speak of this cemetery and until 1908, 20 years after the founding of a new regional cemetery, it was in use. Over 300 people are buried here, including many forefathers of the van den Bergh, Hartog and van Zwanenberg families.

== Present ==
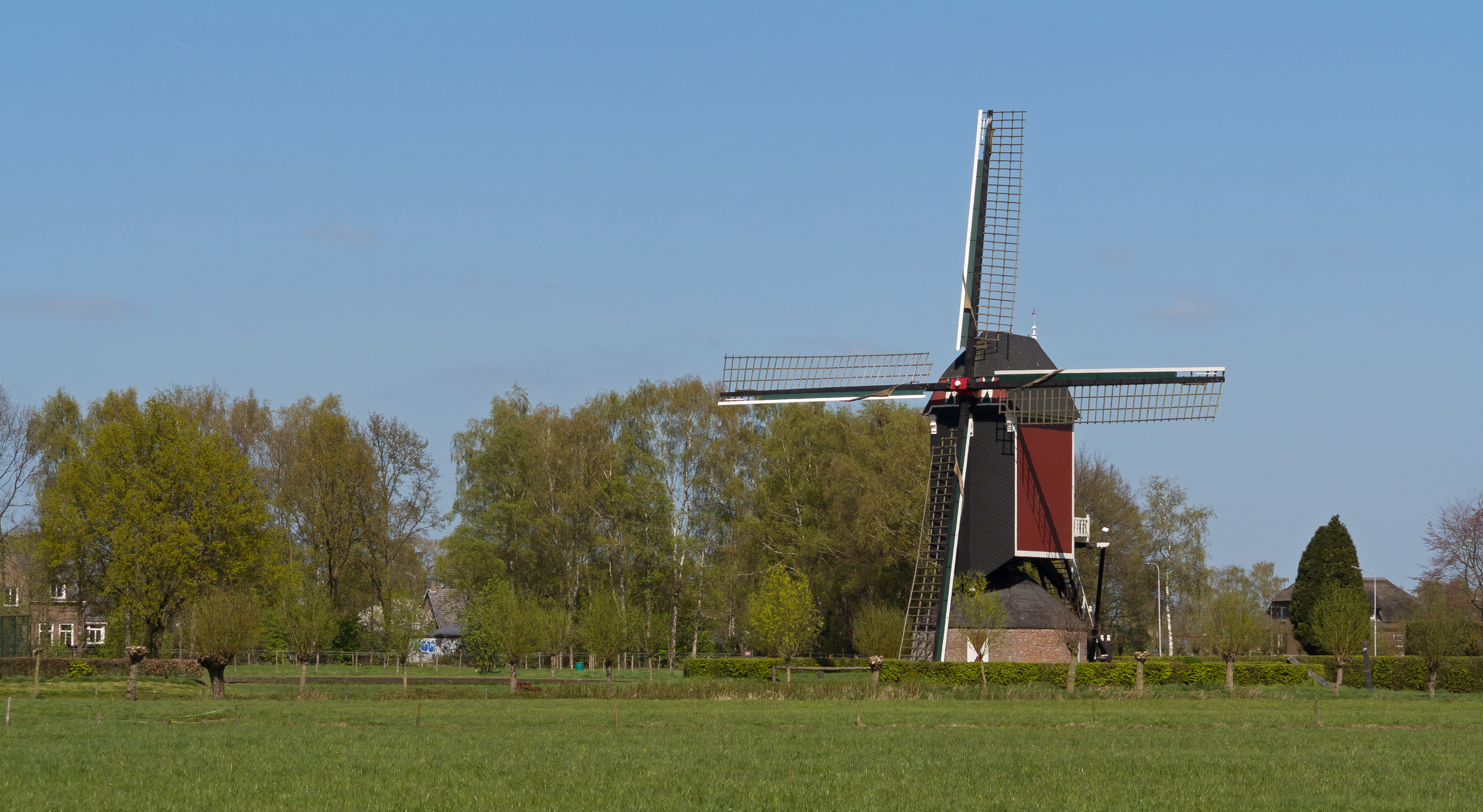
Post mill Zeldenrust (Geffen)

Geffen is a typical town of east Brabant with close to 5,000 inhabitants. The biggest sports club is Nooit Gedacht Geffen, a football club founded in 1929. Every year a farmers' market is organized under the name of 'effe noar geffe'. Every year more people visit this festival and in 2004 more than 35,000 people were welcomed. Because of mismanagement of funds, among other problems, integration into Oss and Den Bosch has been approved, and the dissolution of the village, one part into Den Bosch, another part to Oss, is to be effective as of January 1, 2015.

== Famous Geffenaren ==
- Simon van den Bergh (1819), industrial magnate, father of Samuel van den Bergh, co-founder of Unilever
- Ruud van Nistelrooy (1976), football player, born in Oss

The van Geffen family

== Literature ==
- Jacob Becker: Het smouse Kerkhof te Geffen, 1693-1903, Stichting Iacobus Judeaus, Uden 1987
