= Simon van den Bergh =

Dutch businessman

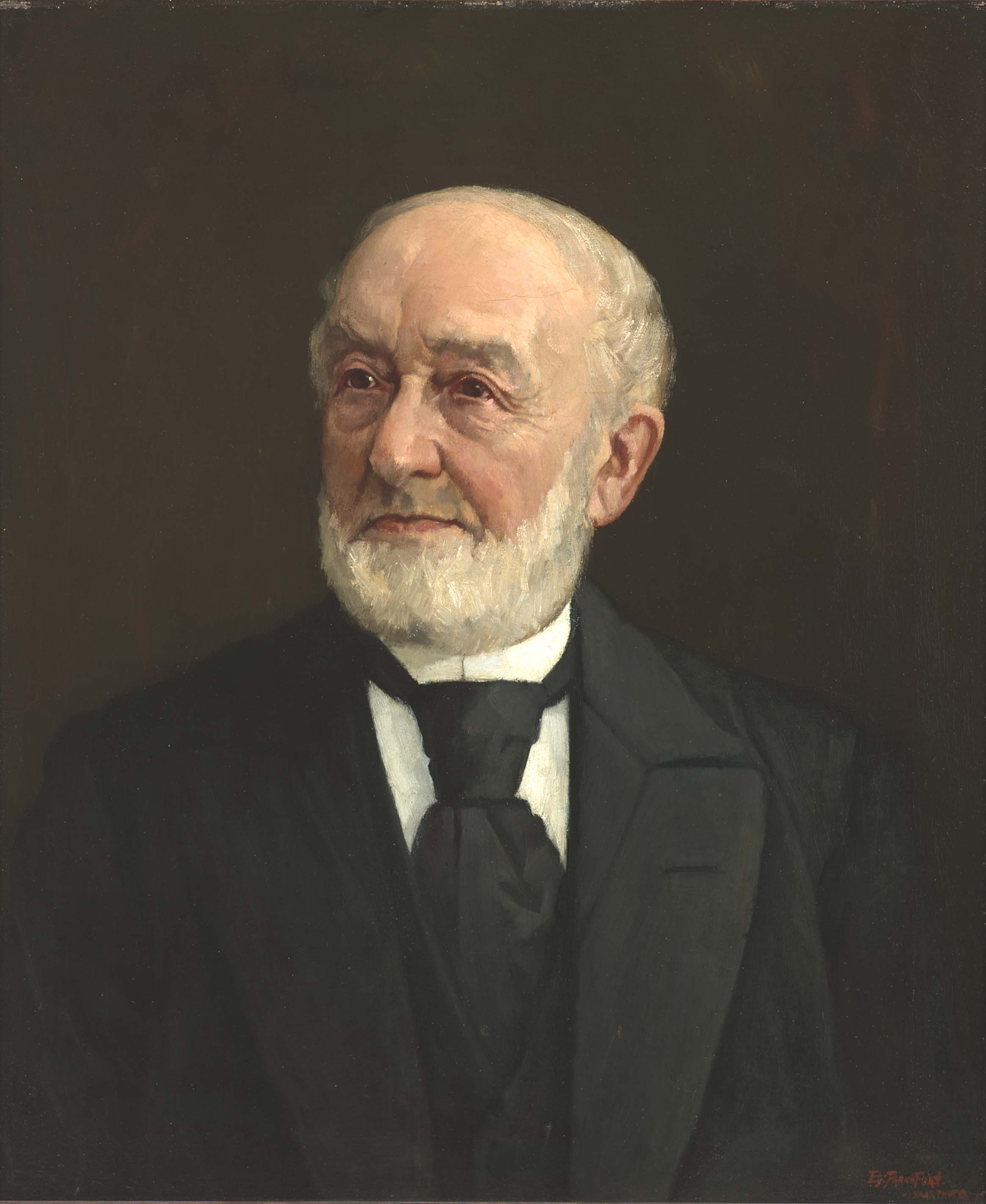
Simon van den Bergh

Simon van den Bergh (October 26, 1819, in Geffen – April 6, 1907, in Rotterdam) was a Dutch businessperson who founded a margarine factory in the Netherlands in 1872.

In 1888, the same year his son Samuel joined the company, he opened another factory in Kleve, the Van den Bergh Margarine Works. By announcing it was for the industrial manufacture of margarine, he was able to circumvent the high tariffs of the German Reich on butter and margarine. The factory introduced the Sanella brand in 1904, made from almond milk.

In the summer of 1929 (after the death of Simon van den Bergh) the Jurgens & Prince Margarine Works in Goch and Van den Bergh in Kleve merged to become Margarine Unie. The newly merged company then combined with English soap manufacturer Lever Brothers to create the modern company Unilever.
