= Margarine Unie =

Dutch margarine manufacturer

Margarine Union N.V.
- Native name: Naamloze Vennootschap Margarine Unie
- Industry: Food
- Predecessors: Antoon Jurgens United; Van den Bergh's; Centra; Schicht's
- Founded: 1927; 99 years ago in Oss, Netherlands
- Founders: Anton Jurgens; Samuel van den Bergh
- Defunct: 1930; 96 years ago
- Fate: Merged with Lever Brothers
- Successor: Unilever
- Headquarters: Rotterdam
- Products: Margarine

Naamloze Vennootschap Margarine Unie (English: Margarine Union Limited) was a Dutch company formed in 1927 in Oss by the merger of four margarine companies, Antoon Jurgens United, Van den Bergh's, Centra, and Schicht's. Margarine Unie was the dominant producer of margarine in the UK.

== History ==
The company origins were in Antoon Jurgens United, a company which was founded in 1867 by Antoon Jurgens. The company introduced its manufactured margarine after acquiring the patents and rights to Hippolyte Mège-Mouriès' invention in 1871. In 1908, production at Antoon Jurgens United was 50,000 tons.

In 1908, Antoon Jurgens United formed a profit-sharing arrangement with Van den Bergh's which had been formed by Samuel van den Bergh and which, like Antoon Jurgens United, was based in the town of Oss, Netherlands.

Schicht's was founded by Georg Schicht whose son Johann Schicht was a German Bohemian entrepreneur and owner of a large soap-making plant.

Naamloze Vennootschap Margarine Unie (English: Margarine Union Limited) was formed in 1927 in Rotterdam by the merger of four margarine companies, Antoon Jurgens United, Van den Bergh's, Centra, and Schicht's. The merged entity acquired the interests of Van den Bergh's in England (Margarine Union Limited) and those of Van den Bergh's and Antoon Jurgens United in the Netherlands (N.V. Margarine Unie). The companies were set up in an agreement under which the shareholders benefited as if they had shares in a single company.

Margarine Unie operated until 1930 when it merged with the British company Lever Brothers, to form the multinational Unilever.

In 2017, Unilever spun its margarine business off into Upfield (Upfield Europe BV), effectively returning the business to its old base in Rotterdam.
