= The English Bread Book =

19th-century cookbook

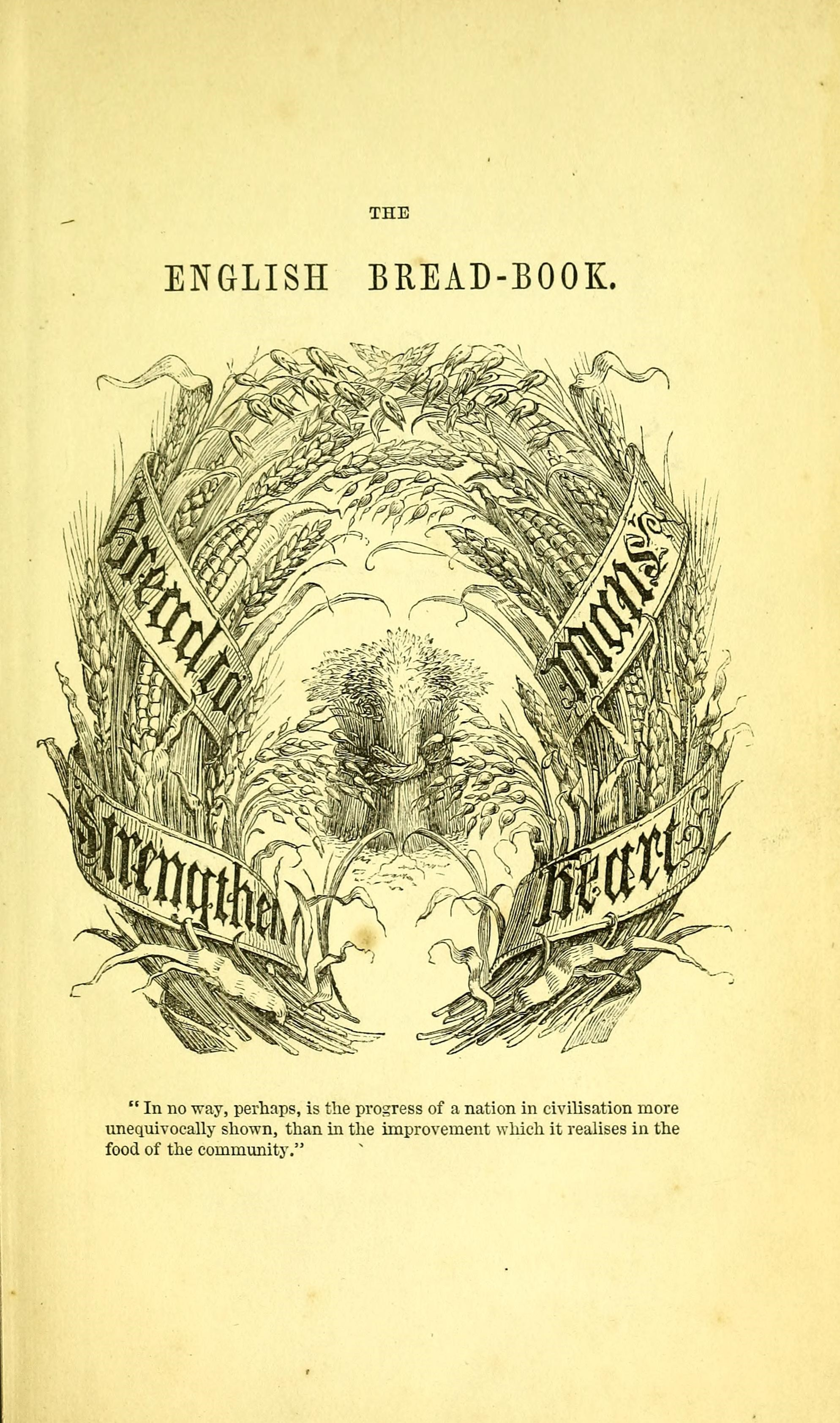
- Frontispiece of the 1857 edition
- Author: Eliza Acton
- Subject: English baking
- Genre: Cookery
- Publisher: Longmans
- Publication date: 1857

The English Bread Book is an English cookery book by Eliza Acton, first published in 1857. The work consists of a history of bread making in England, improvements to the process developed in Europe, an examination of the ingredients used and recipes of different types of bread.

== Book ==
In 1845 the former poet Eliza Acton (Note: In October 1826 Acton had published a collection of poetry under the title Poems; 328 copies were printed and a reprint was needed within a month.) published Modern Cookery for Private Families, a work that was aimed at the English middle classes. A chapter within the book provides bread making and recipes for various styles of bread. Acton undertook a re-write of the book in 1855, but was disappointed that she had not been able to add as much information about bread making into the work as she wanted to. Instead she decided, despite her increasingly poor health, that she would take on the subject in a new work, The English Bread-Book For Domestic Use. (Note: The full title of the work is The English Bread-Book for Domestic Use, Adapted to Families of Every Grade: Containing the Plainest and Most Minute Instructions to the Learner; Practical Receipts for Many Varieties of Bread; With Notices of the Present System of Adulteration, and its Consequences; and of the Improved Baking Processes and Institutions Established Abroad.) Published in May 1857, this is not a recipe book along the same lines as Modern Cookery, but is described by Hardy as "a serious, scientific study ... much darker in tone than her previous work". It consists of a history of bread making in England, improvements made in Europe, an examination of the ingredients used and recipes of different types of bread. Acton also included information about the adulteration of bread by flour millers and bakers of the time, which included the addition of alum and what she called "other deleterious substances". The book was focussed on British bread and, in her preface, Acton wrote "Bread is a first necessity of life to the great mass of the English people; being in part the food of all—the chief food of many—and almost the sole food of many more." She devotes a whole chapter to the approach to bread and bread making in France, Germany and Belgium, and the book contains recipes for German pumpernickel, French baguettes, Italian polenta bread, Turkish rolls and Indian breads.

=== Contents ===
The following list refers to the 1857 edition.

Preface
Contents

Part One

1. Bread, its value
2. Adulteration of bread, and its consequences
3. Large institutions established abroad
4. Gluten
5. To remove the taint of must from wheat
6. Different varieties of bread-corn

Part Two

1. Outline of bread making
2. General rules for baking bread
3. Making dough
4. Bread recipes

== Reception ==
The unknown reviewer for The Literary Gazette wrote a favourable review of The English Bread Book, which was also copied in full in The Manchester Guardian. The reviewer called Acton a "clever author", and praised the inclusion of "the whole philosophy and practice, as well as the history of the subject of bread-making, in its plain and fancy forms". In a review in The Glasgow Herald, the critic considered the book "excellent, and we trust to be popular". Readers of the book, the reviewer thought, will become possessed of a store of useful knowledge, as well as scientific as practical, upon a question which is essentially that of every man, woman and child in the wide universe".

In her work, English Bread and Yeast Cookery, Elizabeth David writes that The English Bread Book heavily influenced and informed her work, and she owes Acton a debt for it. The food writer Elizabeth Ray observes that the book was less successful than Modern Cookery, and was only reprinted in 1990. Although the first edition had "Bread-Book" hyphenated, most subsequent editions did not.

== Notes and references ==
=== Sources ===
- Acton, Eliza (1845). Modern Cookery in all its Branches (2 ed.). London: Longman, Brown, Green and Longmans. OCLC 40747609.
- Acton, Eliza (1857). The English Bread-Book For Domestic Use. London: Longman, Brown, Green Longmans and Roberts. OCLC 14352867.
- David, Elizabeth (2001) [1977]. English Bread and Yeast Book. London: Penguin. ISBN 978-0-1402-9974-8.
- Hardy, Sheila (2011). The Real Mrs Beeton: The Story of Eliza Acton. Stroud, Gloucestershire: The History Press. ISBN 978-0-7524-6122-9.
- Humble, Nicola (2006). Culinary Pleasures. London: Faber and Faber. ISBN 978-0-571-22871-3.
- Lieffers, Caroline (June 2012). ""The Present Time is Eminently Scientific": The Science of Cookery in Nineteenth-Century Britain". Journal of Social History. 45 (4): 936–959. doi:10.1093/jsh/shr106. JSTOR 41678945.
- "Literature". The Glasgow Herald. 19 June 1857. p. 6.
- "Miscellaneous, Pamphlets, &c". The Literary Gazette. 18 January 1845. p. 542.
- "Miss Acton's English Bread-Book". The Manchester Guardian. 18 June 1857. p. 3.
- Ray, Elizabeth (2008). "Acton, Eliza (1799–1859)". Oxford Dictionary of National Biography (online ed.). Oxford University Press. doi:10.1093/ref:odnb/73. (Subscription, Wikipedia Library access or UK public library membership required.)
- "Search results for 'Acton The English Bread Book'". WorldCat.
