= Eliza Acton =

English food writer and poet (1799-1859)

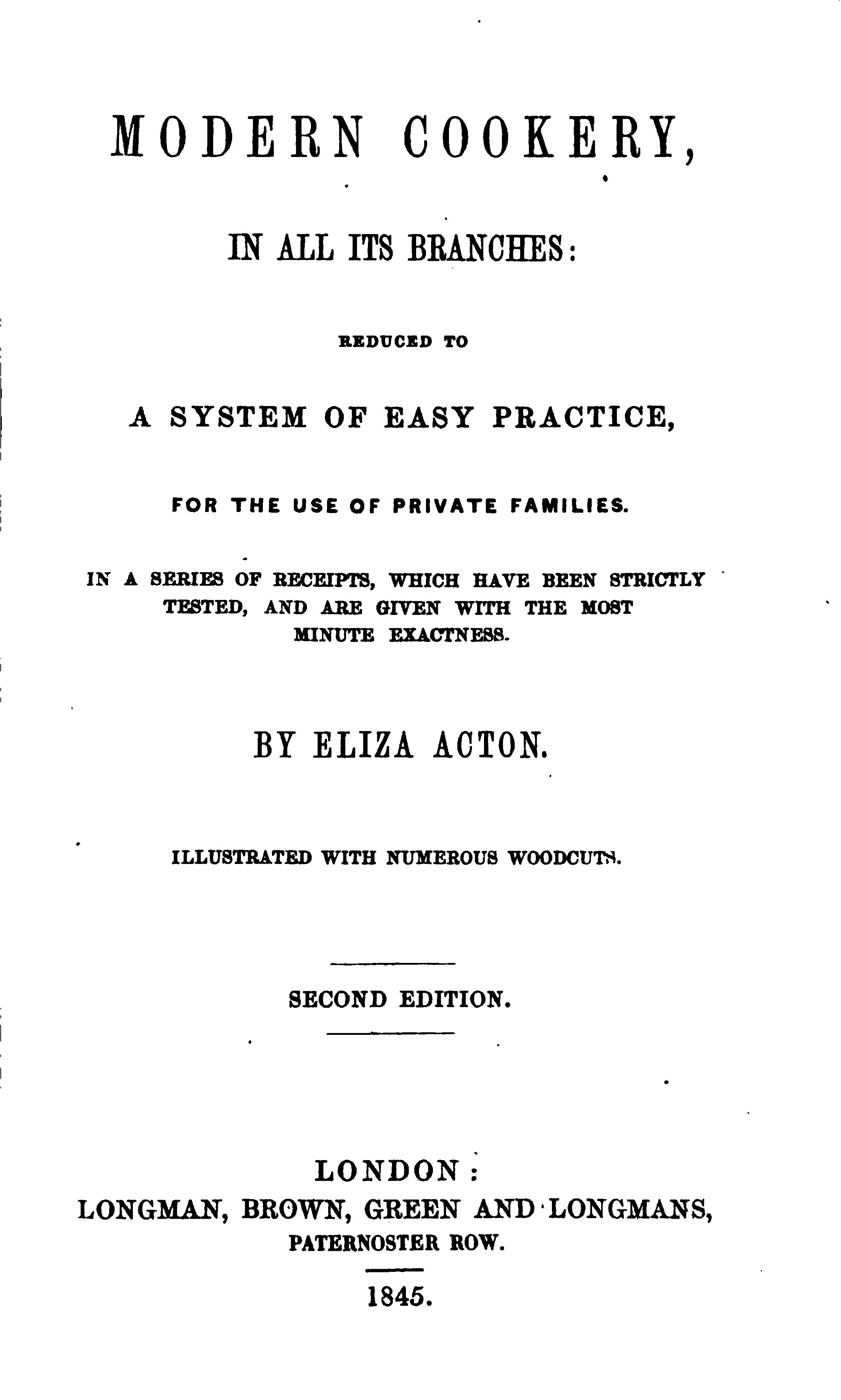
- Frontispiece from Modern Cookery for Private Families, Acton's best known work
- Born: 17 April 1799; Battle, Sussex, England
- Died: 13 February 1859 (aged 59); Hampstead, London, England
- Occupations: Poet; food writer
- Writing career
- Notable work: Modern Cookery for Private Families

Eliza Acton (17 April 1799 – 13 February 1859) was an English food writer and poet who produced one of Britain's first cookery books aimed at the domestic reader, Modern Cookery for Private Families. The book introduced the now-universal practice of listing ingredients and giving suggested cooking times for each recipe. It included the first recipes in English for Brussels sprouts and for spaghetti. It also contains the first recipe for what Acton called "Christmas pudding"; the dish was normally called plum pudding, recipes for which had appeared previously, although Acton was the first to put the name and recipe together.

Acton was born in 1799 in Sussex. She was raised in Suffolk where she ran a girls' boarding school before spending time in France. On her return to England in 1826 she published a collection of poetry and released her cookery book in 1845, aimed at middle class families. Written in an engaging prose, the book was well received by reviewers. It was reprinted within the year and several editions followed until 1918, when Longman, the book's publisher, took the decision not to reprint. In 1857 Acton published The English Bread-Book for Domestic Use, a more academic and studious work than Modern Cookery. The work consisted of a history of bread-making in England, a study of European methods of baking and numerous recipes.

In the later years of its publication, Modern Cookery was eclipsed by the success of Isabella Beeton's bestselling Mrs Beeton's Book of Household Management (1861), which included several recipes plagiarised from Acton's work. Although Modern Cookery was not reprinted in full until 1994, the book has been admired by English cooks in the second part of the 20th century, and influenced many of them, including Elizabeth David, Jane Grigson, Delia Smith and Rick Stein.

== Biography ==
=== Early life ===
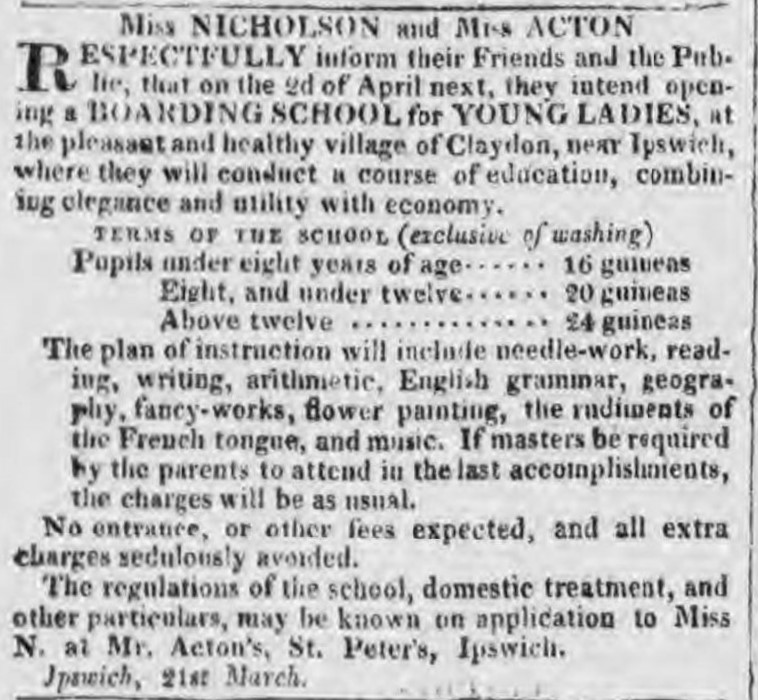
Advertisement placed by Acton in The Ipswich Journal for her boarding school

Eliza Acton was born on 17 April 1799 in Battle, Sussex, and was baptised at her local parish church on 5 June. She was the eldest of six sisters and three brothers born to John Acton, a brewer, and his wife Elizabeth, née Mercer. (Note: Although Acton had eight siblings, one died when only a few weeks old, probably of colic.) By 1800 the family had moved to Ipswich, Suffolk, where they lived in a house adjoining the St. Peter's Brewery, where John took employment running Trotman, Halliday & Studd, the company that owned the brewery. (Note: Trotman, Halliday and Studd the three eponymous owners of the company were involved in other lines of business, and the brewery was an investment for their spare capital, which accounts for John's employment to run the business.) In 1811 Trotman died, and John was offered the opportunity to become the junior partner in the firm; he accepted and the business was renamed Studd, Halliday and Acton. Sheila Hardy, in her biography of Eliza, considers it likely that John would have borrowed heavily to buy himself into the business.

In 1817 Acton, with a Miss Nicolson—about whom no further information is known—opened a "boarding school for young ladies" in Claydon, just outside Ipswich. In 1819 Acton left the school and opened another in September with her sisters, this time at nearby Great Bealings; the school moved three miles (4.8 km) to Woodbridge in 1822 and had probably closed by 1825.

Early in her life Acton spent some time in France—either in Paris or the south of the country—but it is not known when she left England; Hardy considers it likely that she travelled in 1823. The food historian Elizabeth Ray, writing in the Oxford Dictionary of National Biography, states that Acton travelled abroad for the good of her health, because she had a weak constitution. It is possible that she was pregnant when she left for Paris and that she went abroad to give birth to an illegitimate daughter. (Note: Because of the stigma surrounding unintended pregnancies out of wedlock, it was common for middle-class women to move away from home to a relative's house, or abroad, to have the child, which was then adopted by a married relative.) The food writers Mary Aylett and Olive Ordish theorise that Acton's child was raised by Sarah, Eliza's sister. The two observe that "there is no evidence for this, other than family tradition". Hardy dismisses the theory, stating that Acton did not have a sister called Sarah, let alone one who was married (none of Acton's sisters were married); she also observes that she has found no baptismal or census record that would account for a child of the right age. While in France Acton had an unhappy relationship with a French army officer; it is possible there was an engagement, but if so it was broken off. She returned to England, probably in 1826.

=== Poet ===
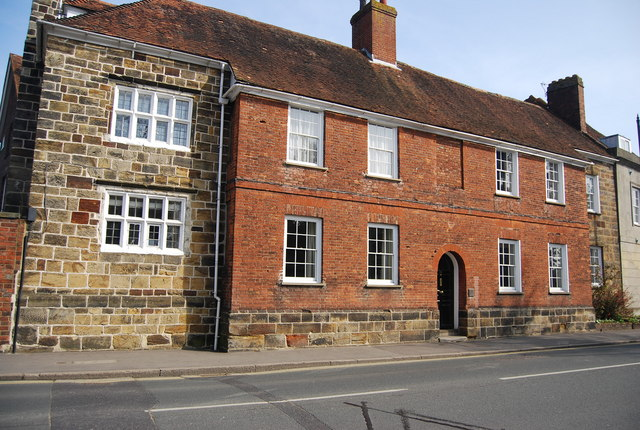
Bordyke House (now Red House), in Tonbridge

Acton had been writing poetry since at least 1822, as she wrote that year on the bottom of one of her poems. (Note: Only five of her existing poems are dated, the first in 1822, the last in May 1826. There is no record of when the others were written.) She wrote at least one while in France, "On Approaching Paris", which she dated 1826. When she returned to England, she arranged for a collection to be published by Longman. As was the practice for publishers at the time, Acton had to provide the names of subscribers—those who had pre-paid for a copy—who were listed inside the work; nearly all came from Suffolk. 328 copies were printed in October 1826 and a reprint was needed within a month. She subsequently wrote some longer poems, including "The Chronicles of Castel Framlingham", which was printed in the Sudbury Chronicle in 1838, and "The Voice of the North", which was written in 1842 on the occasion of Queen Victoria's first visit to Scotland. Other poems were published in a local periodical, the Sudbury Pocket Book.

In 1827 John Acton was declared bankrupt, and the company in which he was a partner was dissolved; one of his business partners was involved in the claim against him. The Commissioner of Bankruptcy ordered John to surrender himself to the Office of the Commissioners to disclose his wealth, but he fled to France. (Note: The practice of bankrupts evading their creditors by going into exile in France was not uncommon; Nelson's mistress, Emma, Lady Hamilton, had done so in 1814.) In his absence his family moved into Bordyke House, in Tonbridge, Kent, where Elizabeth Acton, Eliza's mother, turned the large building into a boarding house for upper class guests, particularly for those who wanted to visit Royal Tunbridge Wells and enjoy the spa facilities there. It is likely that Elizabeth left Bordyke House around 1841, although her daughter remained in residence.

=== Cookery writer ===
Illustrations from the 1845 edition of Modern Cookery for Private Families

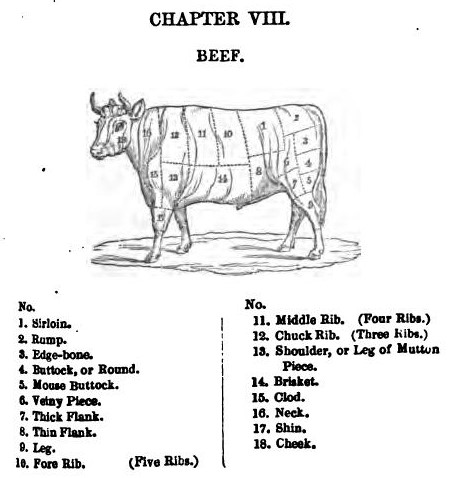
Information on ingredients, including cuts of beef

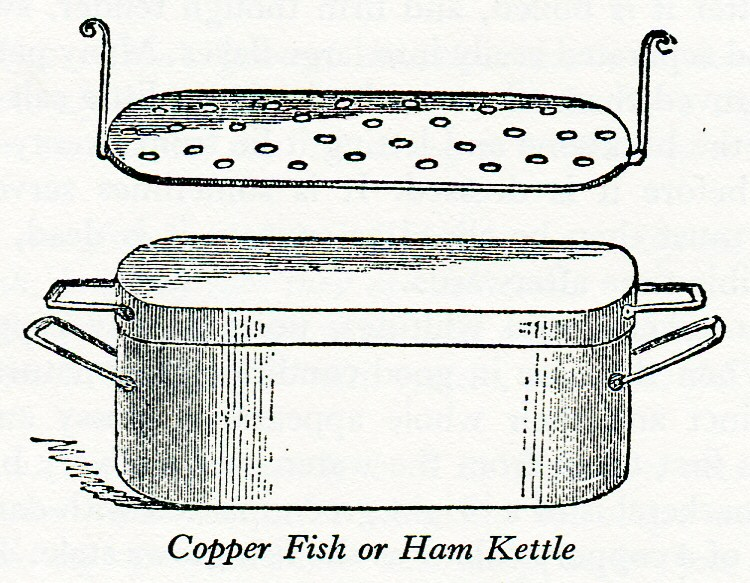
Details of cooking equipment, including a copper kettle for ham or fish

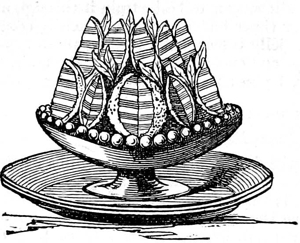
Examples of presentation, including Oranges filled with Jelly

At some point—Hardy considers 1835; Aylett and Ordish consider 1837—Acton sent a further set of poems to Longman for publishing. The company reportedly declined the poems, and suggested that she write a cookery book instead; Hardy considers the story apocryphal. By her own account, Acton took ten years to develop her cookery book, which was published in January 1845 under the title Modern Cookery in all its Branches. (Note: The full title of the book is Modern Cookery in all its Branches: Reduced to a System of Easy Practice, for the Use of Private Families. In a Series of Practical Receipts, Which Have Been Strictly Tested, and are Given with the Most Minute Exactness.) The work was aimed at the English middle classes; in the preface she wrote:

The details of domestic economy, in particular, are no longer sneered at as beneath the attention of the educated and accomplished; and the truly refined, intelligent, and high-minded women of England have ceased, in these days of comparative good sense, to consider their acquaintance with such details as inconsistent with their dignity or injurious to their attractions.

Modern Cookery consists of mainly English recipes, although Acton labelled several of them "French". A chapter covers curries (and potted meats), and gives recipes for Eastern "chatneys" (chutney), treating them as a naturalised Anglo-Indian dish, rather than of solely Indian origin, according to the professor of English literature Susan Zlotnick. The book contains the first recipe for Brussels sprouts, and the first use in an English cookery book of the word spaghetti—which she spelled sparghetti. It also contains the first recipe for what Acton called "Christmas pudding"; the dish was normally called plum pudding, recipes for which had appeared previously, although Acton was the first to put the name and recipe together.

Acton's layout for each recipe was for the description of the cooking process followed by a list of ingredients and the total cooking time required for the preparation of the dish. With the inclusion of timings and ingredients, Modern Cookery differed from other cookery books, and was a development of Acton's own. Acton wrote that each recipe had been cooked and "proved beneath our own roof and under our own personal inspection". The food historian Sarah Freeman describes the cooking instructions Acton produced as being written "so conscientiously, and with such gastronomic sensitivity, that ... [Modern Cookery] was as much a work of art on food as it was functional".

The reviews for Modern Cookery were positive, and the critic from The Morning Post considered it "unquestionably the most valuable compendium of the art that has yet been published". The review in The Spectator stated that the order of the book was "very natural", while "the methods are clearly described, and seem founded on chemical principles"; the reviewer for the Kentish Gazette also commended the clarity of the instructions, and the inclusion of ingredients and timings. The unnamed critic for The Atlas described the layout for the recipes to be "excellent" and, in a positive review in The Exeter and Plymouth Gazette, praise was given to "the intelligibility of the instructions which are given", which contrasted with other cookery books.

A second edition of Modern Cookery was released in May 1845, containing corrections and updates; Longmans also released this version in the US, through the Philadelphia company of Lea & Blanchard. The book sold well, and in June 1845 Longmans sent Acton £67 11s 2d as her share of the profits. (Note: £67 11s 2d refers to the pre-decimal system used in Britain prior to February 1971.) In subsequent years she earned £162 in 1846 and £189 in 1847, when she was being paid half the profits; in 1849 she dropped to quarter of the profits and received £83. (Note: £67 in 1845 is approximately equivalent to £7,040 in 2025; £162 in 1846 is approximately equivalent to £16,330 in 2025; £189 in 1847 is approximately equivalent to £16,950 in 2025; and £83 in 1849 is approximately equivalent to £9,120 in 2025 according to calculations based on Consumer Price Index measure of inflation.)

Some time after Modern Cookery was published, Acton moved from Tonbridge to Hampstead, north west London. She became the cookery correspondent for the weekly magazines The Ladies' Companion and Household Words, and began writing research for a book on nourishment for the ill, Invalid Cookery. She interrupted her research to write a new edition of Modern Cookery. This was published in 1855, and renamed as Modern Cookery for Private Families, (Note: The expanded edition of the book had the full title Modern Cookery for Private Families, Reduced to a System of Easy Practice in a Series of Carefully Tested Receipts in Which the Principles of Baron Liebig and Other Eminent Writers Have Been as Much as Possible Applied and Explained.) the name by which it is best known. This version contains an additional chapter named "Foreign and Jewish Cookery"; the Jewish recipes are from Ashkenazi cuisine.

Such was the success of Acton's first editions of the book, it was increasingly copied by other cookery writers. In the preface to the 1855 edition, Acton wrote of "the unscrupulous manner in which large portions of my volume have been appropriated by contemporary authors, without the slightest acknowledgement of the source from which they have been derived". She was in increasingly poor health during the 1850s and wrote in her preface that she was "suffering at present too severe a penalty for ... over-exertion"; this toil, she continued, was "so completely at variance with all the previous habits of my life, and ... so injurious in its effects".

Acton had been disappointed that she had not been able to add as much information into the 1855 edition about bread-making as she wanted to, but decided, despite her health, that she would take on the subject in a new work, The English Bread-Book for Domestic Use. (Note: The full title of the work is The English Bread-Book for Domestic Use, Adapted to Families of Every Grade: Containing the Plainest and Most Minute Instructions to the Learner; Practical Receipts for Many Varieties of Bread; With Notices of the Present System of Adulteration, and its Consequences; and of the Improved Baking Processes and Institutions Established Abroad. Although the first edition had "Bread-Book" hyphenated, most subsequent editions did not.) Published in May 1857, this was not a recipe book along the same lines as Modern Cookery, but is described by Hardy as "a serious, scientific study ... much darker in tone than her previous work". It consists of a history of bread-making in England, improvements made to the bread-making process in Europe, an examination of the ingredients used and recipes of different types of bread. Acton also included information about the adulteration of bread by flour millers and bakers of the time, which included the addition of alum and what she called "other deleterious substances". The food writer Elizabeth Ray observes that the book was less successful than Modern Cookery, and was not reprinted until 1990.

Acton, who suffered from poor health for much of her life, died at home on 13 February 1859, at the age of 59. She was buried four days later at St John-at-Hampstead church, London.

== Books ==
=== Poems ===
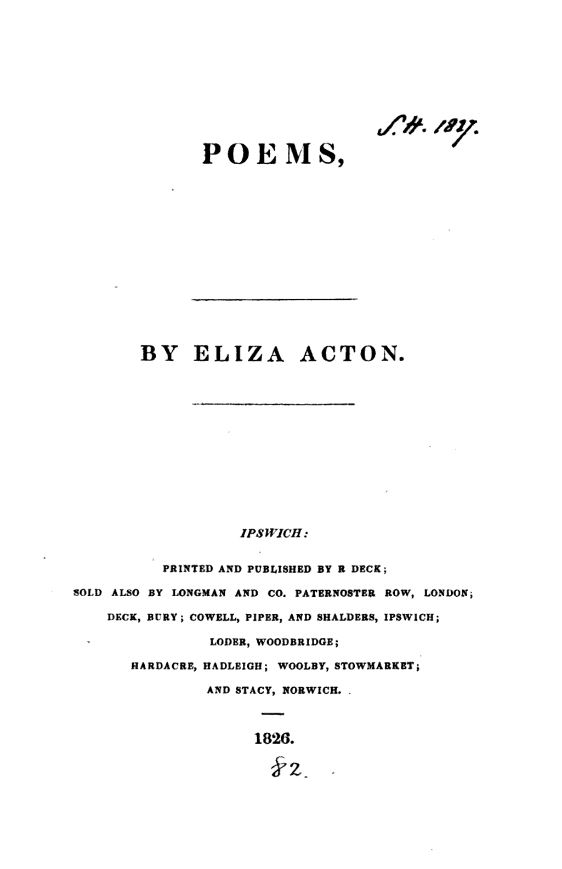
Title page of Poems, Acton's 1826 collection

Lee Christine O'Brien, in her examination of 19th-century women's poetry, considers that Acton "participated in a poetic field the richness of which eclipsed her own output". O'Brien sees humour and humanity in some of Acton's poetry. Aylett and Ordish class Acton's poetry as being written in a romantic style; they consider the work to be "accomplished rather than inspired", although it is also "derivative and often banal" and clichéd. Hardy identifies themes repeated through Acton's poems of the praise of nature and a pleasure in twilight; most of them were on the theme of unrequited love and several may relate to her feelings towards her possible former fiancée. Hardy also sees in the poems an "almost masculine intensity and depth of feeling". O'Brien sees humour in some of Acton's poetry, and cites "Come To My Grave"—a work about "a mildly acerbic and witty potential revenant, musing on revenge"—as a parody of a love lyric with Gothic romantic overtones.

Come to my grave when I am gone,
And bend a moment there alone;
It will not cost thee much of pain
To trample on my heart again–
Or, if it would, for ever stay
Far distant from my mouldering clay:
I would not wound thy breast to prove
E'en its most deep, 'remorse of love.'
The grave should be a shrine of peace
Where all unkindly feelings cease;–
Though thou wilt calmly gaze on mine
I would not live the hour to see,
Which doom'd my glance to rest on thine:–
That moment's bitter agony
Would bid the very life-blood start
Back, and congeal around my heart!–

=== Cookery ===
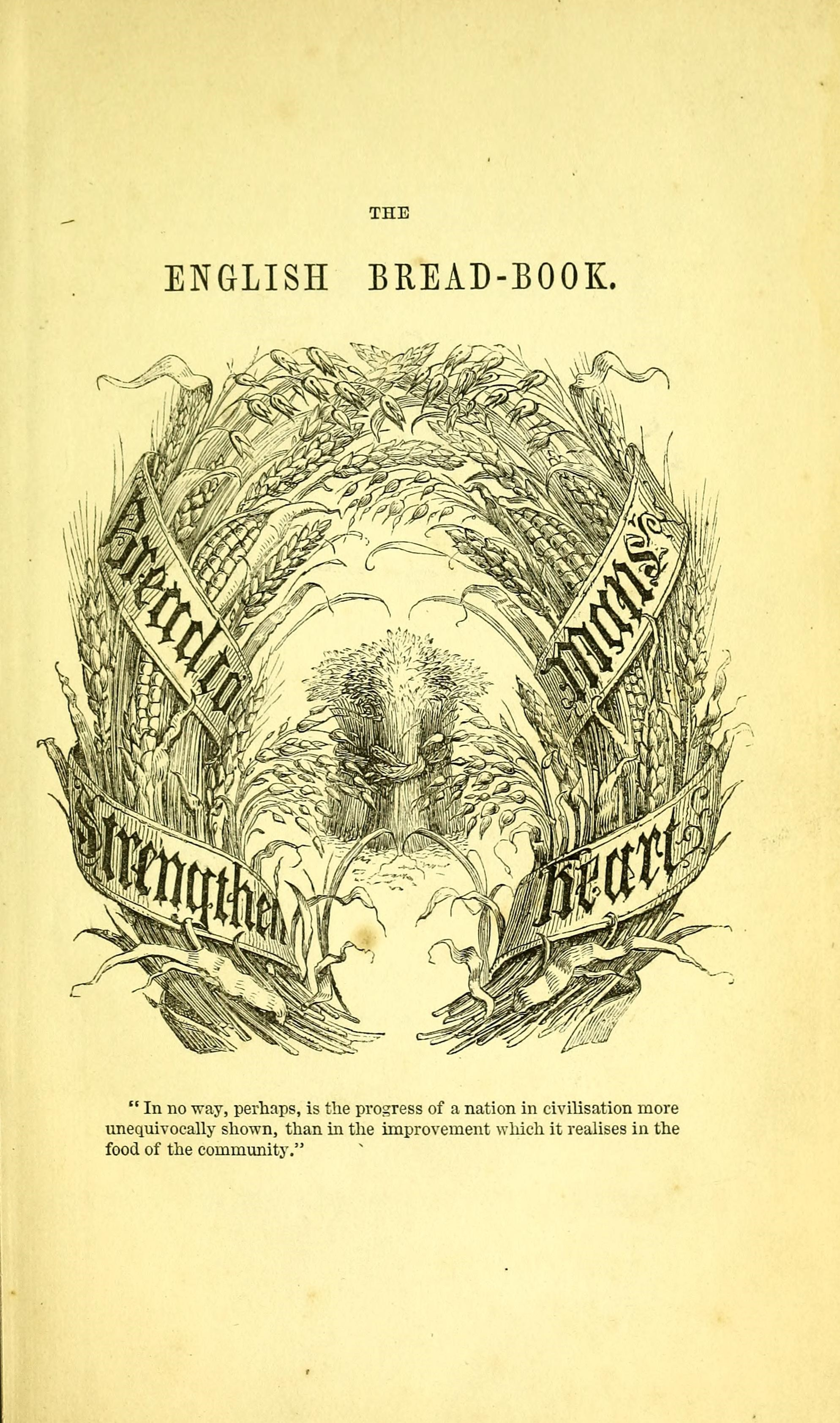
Frontispiece of The English Bread Book, 1857

O'Brien sees that, through the high quality of Acton's prose, Modern Cookery is a unique cultural document. As the food writer Elizabeth David writes,

[Acton's] ... book was the final expression ... of pre-Industrial England's taste in food and attitude to cookery. The dishes she describes and the ingredients which went into them would have been familiar to Jane Austen and Lord Byron, to Fanny Burney and Tobias Smollett.

Many of the dishes Acton describes belong, according to David, to the 18th century and, with increasing industrialisation and urbanisation of the 19th century, the staple foods described were already being replaced. David cites the example of Bird's Custard Powder, launched in 1840, as an example of the radical changes being introduced to cooking. Acton adopted some of the changes in food science into the 1855 re-write of the book, including the developments of Justus von Liebig—the developer of the Oxo brand beef stock cube—and William Gregory, Liebig's pupil and translator.

Acton, in her preface to Modern Cookery, writes that her "first and best attention has been bestowed on ... what are usually termed plain English dishes" for her recipes, and Christopher Driver, the journalist and food critic, considers the book "as English as ... [its] eighteenth-century predecessors". Elizabeth Ray observes that while Acton "is basically a very English cook", many of the recipes are labelled as French dishes, and foreign food is given its own chapter. These are recipes from the cuisines of India, Syria, Turkey, Italy, Germany, Portugal, Mauritius, Switzerland and the West Indies. Acton was willing to learn from foreign food cultures, and wrote "Without adopting blindly foreign modes in anything merely because they are foreign, surely we should be wise to learn from other nations". Similarly, The English Bread Book was focused on British bread and, in her preface, Acton wrote "Bread is a first necessity of life to the great mass of the English people; being in part the food of all—the chief food of many—and almost the sole food of many more." She devotes a whole chapter to the approach to bread and bread-making in France, Germany and Belgium, and the book contains recipes for German pumpernickel, French baguettes, Italian polenta bread, Turkish rolls and Indian breads.

The food historian Bob Ashley identifies that the strongest theme in Modern Cookery is economy in food, although this is also tempered by Acton's advice to reject dubious ingredients. In her preface to the book, Acton writes that "It may be safely averred that good cookery is the best and truest economy, turning to full account every wholesome article of food, and converting into palatable meals what the ignorant either render uneatable or throw away in disdain". She provides a recipe for "Elegant Economist's Pudding", which uses left-over Christmas pudding; when giving a recipe for "Superlative Hare Soup", she also provides one for "A Less Expensive Hare Soup". (Note: The superlative soup includes a hare, ham, mace and half a pint (280 ml) of port; ingredients for the less expensive version include beef, hare and a bunch of savoury herbs.) The social historian John Burnet observes that although the dishes were supposedly aimed at middle-class families of modest income, the book contains recipes that include truffles in champagne, soles in cream and a pie of venison and hare. (Note: The recipes are, respectively: "Truffles with Champagne, A La Serviette" which, Acton writes, is so expensive as to only be served by the wealthy; "Soles Stewed in Cream"—the recipe uses half to a pint (280–570 ml) of "as much sweet rich cream as will cover ... [the fillets]"—Acton notes that a Cornish alternative uses clotted cream; and "A Good Common English Game Pie"—Acton lists truffled sausage meat an optional ingredient.)

The food writer Alan Davidson considers Modern Cookery to be "among the most elegantly written (and practical) cookery books ever published". Nicola Humble, in her book on the history of British cookery books, writes that Acton provides "the quirky, confident perspective of the expert" in text that is "alive with adjectives and opinions ... the prose enthuses and evokes". In 1968 Elizabeth David wrote that Acton's recipes were both illuminating and decisive. Examining a 100-word paragraph in Modern Cookery for instructions on beating egg whites for a sponge cake, David considers it superior to an eight-page piece on the same topic in the 1927 work La bonne cuisine de Madame E. Saint-Ange.

There is humour in Acton's work, particularly when reporting on a recipe going wrong. Her recipe for Publisher's Pudding, which contains cognac, macaroons, cream and almonds, "can scarcely be made too rich", while the Poor Author's Pudding is made with milk, bread, eggs and sugar, and is a more simple dish. Similarly, in her recipe for Superior Pine-Apple Marmalade, she writes that if the mixture is placed onto a direct heat it "will often convert what would otherwise be excellent preserve, into a strange sort of compound, for which it is difficult to find a name".

== Legacy ==
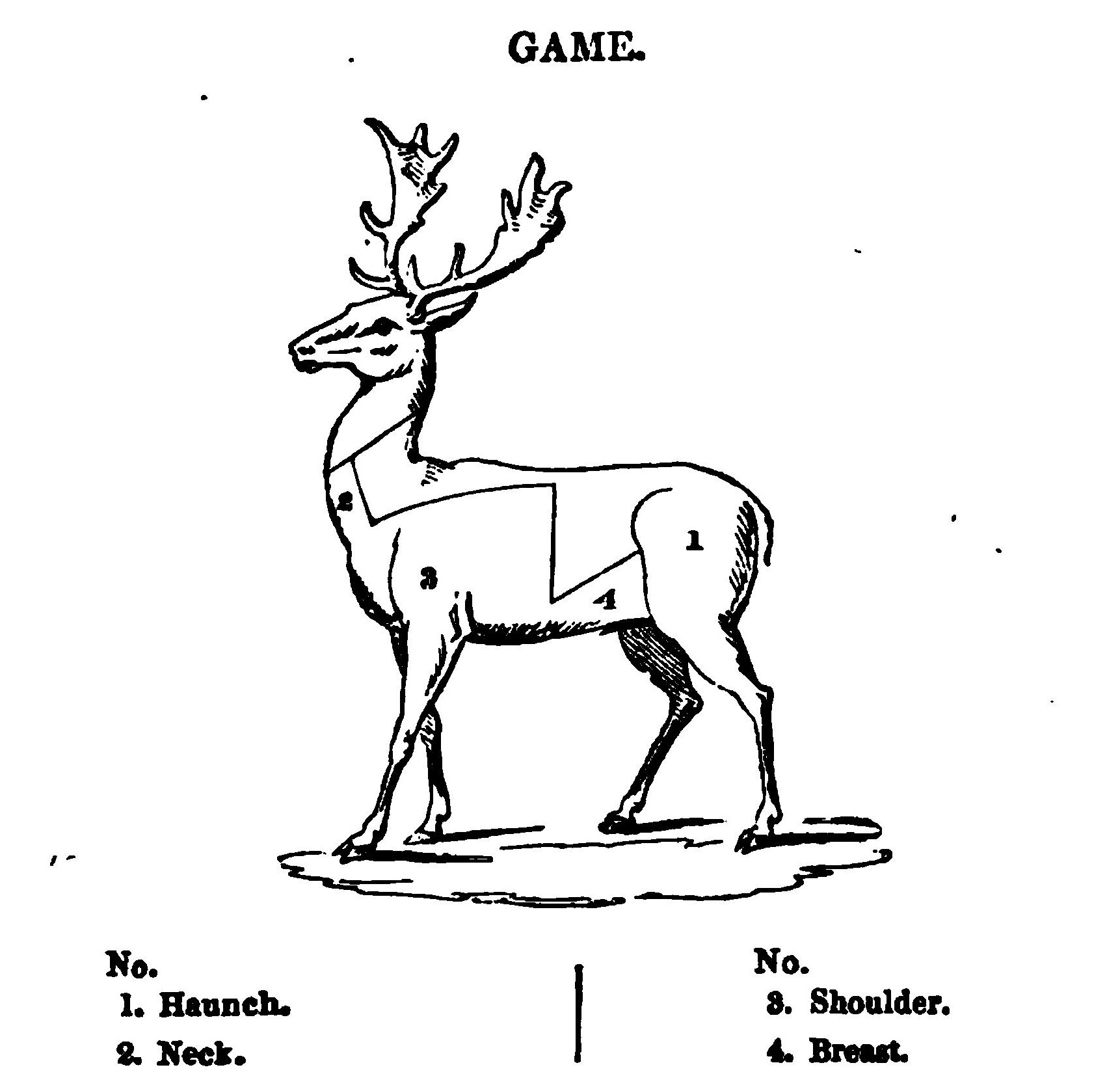
Cuts of game, from Modern Cookery

Modern Cookery remained in print until 1918, when its popularity waned in the face of competition from other books and Longmans took the decision not to republish. Acton's works remained out of print until 1968 when a selection of her recipes was collected into The Best of Eliza Acton, edited by Elizabeth Ray and including an introduction by Elizabeth David. Modern Cookery was not reprinted in full until 1994, although The English Bread Book was reprinted in 1990.

In 1857, when Isabella Beeton began writing the cookery column for The Englishwoman's Domestic Magazine, many of the recipes were plagiarised from Modern Cookery. In 1861 Isabella's husband, Samuel, published Mrs Beeton's Book of Household Management, which also contained several of Acton's recipes. (Note: Acton's work was not the only one to be copied by the Beetons. Other cookery books plagiarised include Elizabeth Raffald's The Experienced English Housekeeper, Marie-Antoine Carême's Le Pâtissier royal parisien, Louis Eustache Ude's The French Cook, Alexis Soyer's The Modern Housewife or, Ménagère and The Pantropheon, Hannah Glasse's The Art of Cookery Made Plain and Easy, Maria Eliza Rundell's A New System of Domestic Cookery and the works of Charles Elmé Francatelli.) Isabella Beeton's biographer Kathryn Hughes gives as examples one third of Beeton's soup dishes and a quarter of her fish recipes, which are all taken from Acton. In her works, Isabella Beeton partly followed the new layout of Acton's recipes, although with a major alteration: whereas Modern Cookery provides the method of cooking followed by a list of the required ingredients, the recipes in The Englishwoman's Domestic Magazine and Mrs Beeton's Book of Household Management list the timings and components before the cooking process.

The food historian Bee Wilson considers many modern cookery writers to be indebted to Acton and her work. Elizabeth David wrote in 1977 that The English Bread Book was a major influence on and source for her own English Bread and Yeast Cookery, and that she owes Acton a debt for it; David also describes Modern Cookery as "the greatest cookery book in our language". The cook Delia Smith is of a similar opinion, and describes Acton as "the best cookery writer in the English language". The cookery writer Jane Grigson was influenced by Acton, particularly when she wrote English Food (1974), while the chef Rick Stein included her "Soles Stewed in Cream" in his cookery book Seafood Lovers' Guide (2000).

== Notes and references ==
=== Sources ===
- Acton, Eliza (1826). Poems. London: Longman & Co. OCLC 13284872.
- Acton, Eliza (1845). Modern Cookery in all its Branches (2 ed.). London: Longman, Brown, Green and Longmans. OCLC 40747609.
- Acton, Eliza (1855). Modern Cookery for Private Families. London: Longman, Brown, Green and Longmans. OCLC 758341567.
- Acton, Eliza (1857). The English Bread-Book for Domestic Use. London: Longman, Brown, Green Longmans and Roberts. OCLC 14352867.
- Ashley, Bob (2004). Food and Cultural Studies. London: Routledge. ISBN 978-0-4152-7039-7.
- Aylett, Mary; Ordish, Olive (1965). First Catch Your Hare. London: Macdonald. OCLC 54053.
- Black, Maggie (12 December 1981). "The Englishman's Plum Pudding". History Today.
- Broomfield, Andrea (Summer 2008). "Rushing Dinner to the Table: The Englishwoman's Domestic Magazine and Industrialization's Effects on Middle-Class Food and Cooking, 1852–1860". Victorian Periodicals Review. 41 (2): 101–123. doi:10.1353/vpr.0.0032. JSTOR 20084239. S2CID 161900658.
- Brown, Mark (2 June 2006). "Mrs Beeton couldn't cook but she could copy, reveals historian". The Guardian. Archived from the original on 8 December 2015.
- Burnett, John (April 1964). "Plenty and Want: The Social History of English Diet". History Today. (subscription required)
- Clark, Gregory (2023). "The Annual RPI and Average Earnings for Britain, 1209 to Present (New Series)". MeasuringWorth.
- Colquhoun, Kate (2008). Taste: The Story of Britain through Its Cooking. London: Bloomsbury Publishing. ISBN 978-0-7475-9306-5.
- Cooke, Rachel (15 March 2015). "Jane Grigson: her life and legacy". The Observer.
- David, Elizabeth (1974) [1968]. "Introduction". In Ray, Elizabeth (ed.). The Best of Eliza Acton. London: Penguin. pp. xxv–xxx. ISBN 978-0-14-046205-0.
- David, Elizabeth (2001) [1977]. English Bread and Yeast Book. London: Penguin. ISBN 978-0-1402-9974-8.
- Davidson, Alan (Winter 1983). "Food: The Natural History of British Cookery Books". The American Scholar. 52 (1): 98–106. JSTOR 41210911.
- Davidson, Alan (2014). The Oxford Companion to Food. Oxford: Oxford University Press. ISBN 978-0-1910-4072-6.
- Driver, Christopher (1983). The British at Table 1940–1980. London: Chatto & Windus. ISBN 978-0-7011-2582-0.
- Freeman, Len (5 February 2011). "How Britain Converted to Decimal Currency". BBC News.
- Freeman, Sarah (1977). Isabella and Sam: The Story of Mrs. Beeton. London: Victor Gollancz Ltd. ISBN 978-0-575-01835-8.
- Freeman, Sarah (1989). Mutton and Oysters: The Victorians and Their Food. London: Gollancz. ISBN 978-0-575-03151-7.
- Hardy, Sheila (2011). The Real Mrs Beeton: The Story of Eliza Acton. Stroud, Gloucestershire: The History Press. ISBN 978-0-7524-6122-9.
- Hughes, Kathryn (2006). The Short Life and Long Times of Mrs Beeton. London: HarperCollins Publishers. ISBN 978-0-7524-6122-9.
- Hughes, Kathryn (15 May 2014). "Mrs Beeton and the Art of Household Management". British Library. Archived from the original on 6 January 2016.
- Humble, Nicola (2006). Culinary Pleasures. London: Faber and Faber. ISBN 978-0-571-22871-3.
- Jack, Albert (2010). What Caesar Did For My Salad: Not to Mention the Earl's Sandwich, Pavlova's Meringue and Other Curious Stories Behind Our Favourite Food. London: Penguin. ISBN 978-1-84614-254-3.
- Lieffers, Caroline (June 2012). "'The Present Time is Eminently Scientific': The Science of Cookery in Nineteenth-Century Britain". Journal of Social History. 45 (4): 936–959. doi:10.1093/jsh/shr106. JSTOR 41678945. S2CID 145735940.
- "Literary Memoranda". The Atlas. 25 January 1845. p. 11.
- "Literature". Woolmer's Exeter and Plymouth Gazette. 25 January 1845. p. 4.
- "Literature". The Morning Post. 17 February 1845. p. 3.
- "Literature Received". The Spectator. 18 January 1845. p. 66.
- "Modern Cookery". Kentish Gazette. 28 January 1845. p. 3.
- Notaker, Henry (2017). A History of Cookbooks: From Kitchen to Page over Seven Centuries. Oakland, CA: University of California Press. ISBN 978-0-520-96728-1.
- O'Brien, Lee Christine (2012). The Romance of the Lyric in Nineteenth-Century Women's Poetry: Experiments in Form. Newark, DE: University of Delaware. ISBN 978-1-61149-392-4.
- Quayle, Eric (1978). Old Cook Books: an illustrated history. London: Studio Vista. ISBN 978-0-2897-0707-4.
- Ray, Elizabeth (1974) [1968]. "Preface". In Ray, Elizabeth (ed.). The Best of Eliza Acton. London: Penguin. pp. xix–xxiii. ISBN 978-0-14-046205-0.
- Ray, Elizabeth (2008). "Acton, Eliza (1799–1859)". Oxford Dictionary of National Biography (online ed.). Oxford University Press. doi:10.1093/ref:odnb/73. (Subscription, Wikipedia Library access or UK public library membership required.)
- "Resources". The Digest. 10 (2). September 1990.
- Smith, Delia (2011). Foreword. The Real Mrs Beeton: The Story of Eliza Acton. By Hardy, Sheila. Stroud, Gloucestershire: The History Press. ISBN 978-0-7524-6122-9.
- "Search results for 'Acton The English Bread Book'". WorldCat.
- Snodgrass, Mary Ellen (2004). Encyclopedia of Kitchen History. Abingdon, Oxfordshire: Routledge. ISBN 978-1-135-45572-9.
- "Spaghetti". Oxford English Dictionary (online ed.). Oxford University Press. (Subscription or participating institution membership required.)
- Stein, Rick (29 November 2003). "Let's live a little". The Guardian.
- Walker, Julian (2013). Discovering Words in the Kitchen. London: Bloomsbury Publishing. ISBN 978-0-7478-0952-4.
- Wilson, Bee (8 May 2011). "Eliza Acton, my heroine". The Sunday Telegraph.
- Zlotnick, Susan (1996). "Domesticating Imperialism: Curry and Cookbooks in Victorian England". Frontiers: A Journal of Women Studies. 16 (2/3): 51–68. doi:10.2307/3346803. JSTOR 3346803.
