= John Burnett (historian) =

John Burnett (20 December 1925 – 5 November 2006) was a social historian who was a professor at Brunel University between 1972 and 1990. His research examined the day-to-day lives of ordinary British people in the 19th and 20th centuries.

Originally from Nottingham, he studied at New College Nottingham (formerly known as High Pavement School), and then read history and law at Emmanuel College, Cambridge, then law at the University of London. He taught at Guildford Technical College and London South Bank University (formerly known as Borough Polytechnic) before reading for a PhD in history at the London School of Economics.

The Burnett Archive of Working Class Autobiography, housed at Brunel University and containing over 230 autobiographies, was compiled by Burnett, David Vincent and David Mayall. Burnett, Vincent and Myall co-edited The Autobiography of the Working Class, in three volumes, based on their work on the archive.

== Select bibliography ==
- Plenty and Want: Social History of Food in England from 1815 to the Present Day, 1966
- A History of the Cost of Living, 1969
- Useful Toil: Autobiographies of Working People from the 1820s to the 1920, 1974
- Destiny Obscure: Autobiographies of Childhood, Education and Family from the 1820s to the 1920s, 1982
- The Autobiography of the Working Class: An Annotated, Critical Bibliography, 1984-9 (three volume collection, co-edited with David Vincent and David Mayall)
- A Social History of Housing, 1815-1985, 1986
- Idle Hands: Experience of Unemployment, 1790-1990, 1994
- The Origins and Development of Food Policies in Europe, 1994 (with Derek Oddy)
- Liquid Pleasures: A Social History of Drinks in Modern Britain, 1999
- England Eats Out: A Social History of Eating Out in England from 1830 to the Present, 2004
