= Antoon Jurgens =

Dutch businessman (1805–1880)

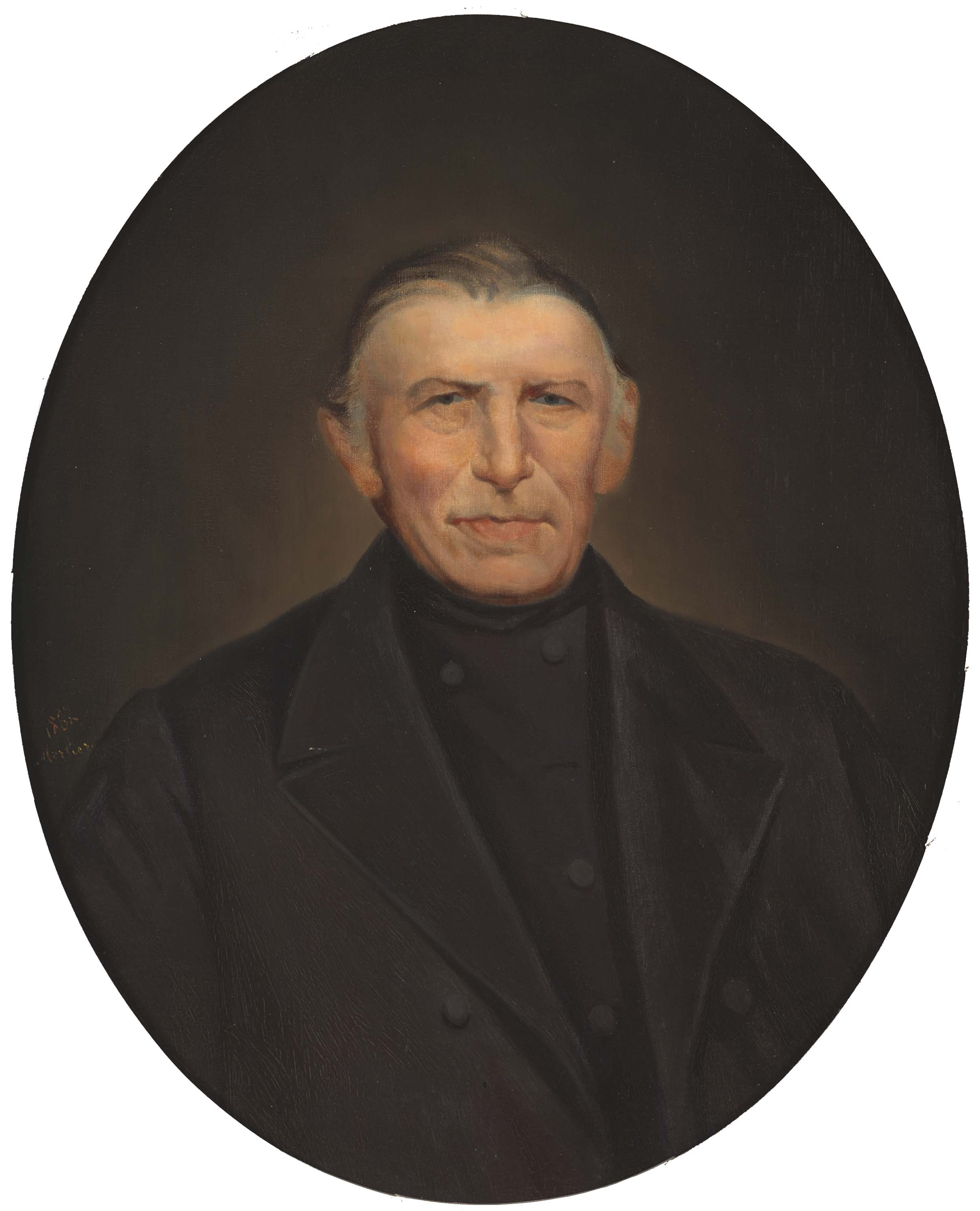
- Born: 1805; Oss, Netherlands
- Died: 1880 (aged 75); Oss, Netherlands
- Occupations: Merchant, industrialist

Antoon Jurgens (1805-1880) was a Dutch merchant and industrialist. He founded a butter company that grew to be one of the largest butter and margarine companies in the world. His company was instrumental in the formation of Margarine Unie which, in 1930, merged with Lever Brothers to form Unilever.

== Family ==
He was the son of Wilhelmus Jurgens and Henrica van Valkenburg. Wilhelmus, Leonard and Jan were brothers from Nieuwenhagen who came to Oss at the turn of the nineteenth century. Jurgens uncle, Leonard also married a member of the Valkenburg family, the van Valkenburgs were one of the biggest trading families in Oss. Under the Jurgens, the van Valkenburg business expanded.

On 19 May 1832 Jurgens married Johanna Lemmens (1807-1879), the daughter of Arnoldus Ambrosius Lemmens, farmer and mayor of Beugen and Rijkevoort from 1811 to 1819, owner of the brewery the Unicorn (De Eenhoorn) in Oploo, and Gertrudis van de Voordt, from a family who were also mayors of Beugen en Rijkevoort. They had ten children.

== Civic activities ==
From 1844 to 1850 Jurgens was a member of the Council of Oss.

== Business activities ==
Jurgens became in 1820 a butter merchant in Oss, Netherlands. The demand for butter increased because of the Belgian Revolt, which caused a large number of soldiers to be stationed in that part North Brabant of the Netherlands. After his father's death in 1836, he and his brothers continued the family company. In 1854, Jurgens and his brother, Johannes formed Gebroeders Jurgens, a partnership specialized in the butter trade. In the 1850s and 1860s, a rise in the value of butter to British and German citizens increased the brothers’ wealth, while the brothers largely concentrated on servicing those markets, trade in the home market. Increased demand led to shipment of supplies obtained in Germany and Austria.

In a notary document of 25 April 1867, he and his sons Jan, Hendrikus, and Arnoldus, formed a limited company under the name Antoon Jurgens, to actively pursue wholesale trade in butter, and to create a dairy farm. Hendrikus was their accountant, Jan was the salesman, and Arnoldus was in charge of the technical aspects of the business. They bought butter in the Netherlands, Germany and Austria. The butter was brought to Oss, where it was treated, packed and shipped. The Prussian-Danish and the Austro-Prussian wars increased the price of butter without a significant impact in transporting the product.

In May 1871, through the butter industry, Jurgens met Hippolyte Mège-Mouriès, a Frenchman, who had invented margarine. Mège-Mouriès had licensed his patent to business in other countries but not to anyone in the Netherlands, as the Netherlands did not have a patent law until 1910. Jurgens paid for a demonstration of Mège-Mouriès' process. Later that year Jurgens started experimental production of margarine to which initially real butter was added.

== Retirement ==
Around 1875 Jurgens wound down his activities in the company. As a Roman Catholic he bequeathed, in 1876, a head altar to the Great Church of Oss, Netherlands.

== Business legacy ==
The company became one of the largest butter and margarine businesses in Europe. It was one of the two companies whose merger, in 1927, sparked the formation of Margarine Unie, which three years later, in 1930, joined Lever Brothers to create Unilever.

== Descendants ==
Antoon Jurgens and his wife Johanna Lemmens had 10 children, including three sons who continued the margarine factory after his death in 1880:

- Johannes Arnoldus Jurgens (1835–1913)
- Hendrikus Leonardus Jurgens (1840–1888)
- Arnoldus Jurgens (1842–1912)
