= The Atlas (newspaper) =

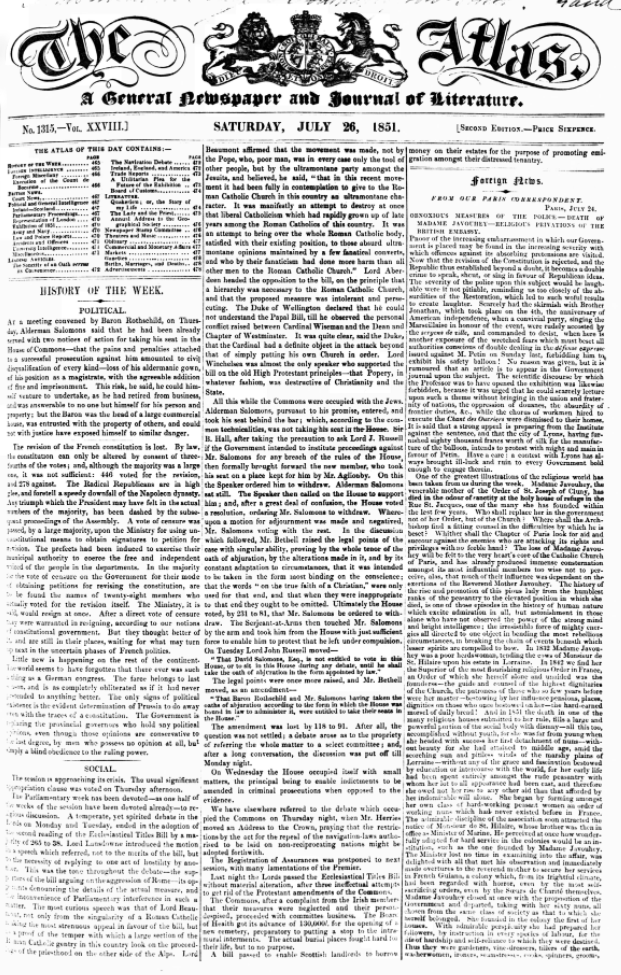
The Atlas No. 1315

The Atlas was a weekly newspaper published in England from 1826 to 1869.

== History ==
The newspaper was founded by Robert Stephen Rintoul in London in 1826. Describing itself as "a general newspaper and journal of literature", The Atlas initially distinguished itself from its rivals both by the size of paper it used (it boasted of being printed on "the largest sheet ever issued from the press") and by its price (one shilling, almost double that of comparable journals). The price was gradually reduced (10d in 1828, 8d in 1846, falling to 2d by 1858). In the late 1850s, publication was taken over by the United Kingdom Alliance, a Manchester-based pro-temperance organization. The title was changed to The Englishman between 1862 and 1865, before reverting to The Atlas. During 1869, the final year of its operation, its name changed to The Atlas and Public Schools Chronicle and finally The Public Schools Chronicle for the remainder of that year.

== Content ==
The newspaper supported the Whigs, (later Liberals). Noted contributors included William Hazlitt, Leigh Hunt, Louis Kossuth and George Henry Lewes.
